= USRC Grant =

Ship of the U.S. Revenue Cutter Service

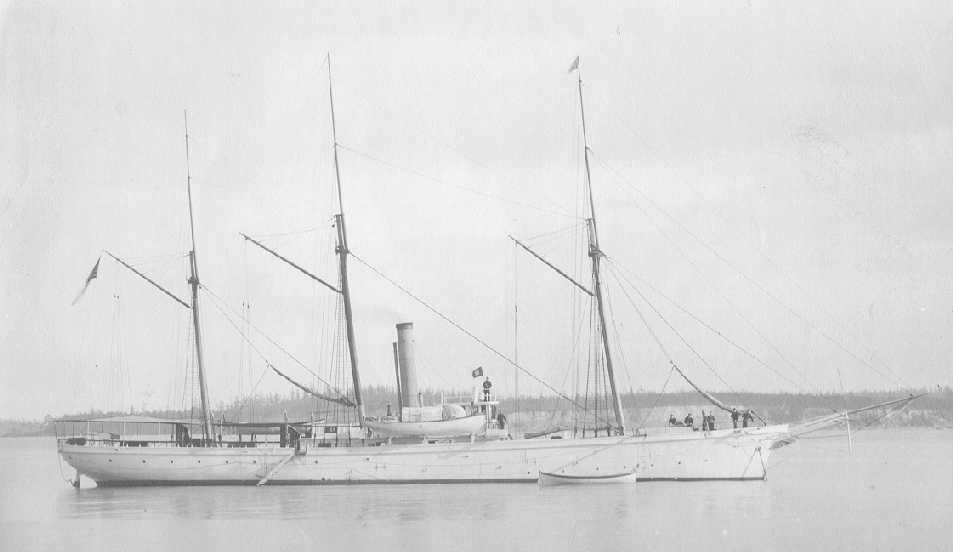
- USRC Grant

History

United States
- Namesake: Ulysses S. Grant
- Builder: Pusey and Jones Corporation, Wilmington, Delaware
- Cost: $92,500
- Laid down: 1870
- Launched: 1871
- Decommissioned: 28 November 1906
- Stricken: 28 November 1906
- Nickname(s): U. S. Grant
- Fate: Sold to A. A. Cragin of Seattle for $16 ,300

General characteristics
- Type: Barque-rigged, iron-hulled
- Displacement: 350 tons
- Length: 163 ft (49.7 m)
- Beam: 25 ft (7.6 m)
- Draft: 9 ft 6 in (2.9 m)
- Installed power: Coal
- Propulsion: One vertical, direct action steam engine, 36.5" diameter × 36" stroke, single screw
- Sail plan: Bark without Royal Yards
- Speed: 11 knots (20 km/h; 13 mph)
- Boats & landing craft carried: 3
- Complement: 45
- Crew: 7 officers, 34 enlisted
- Armament: 4 × 24-pounder howitzers (before 1893)

USRC Grant was a rare, three-masted revenue cutter built in 1870 and 1871 by Pusey & Jones Corporation in Wilmington, Delaware. She served the United States Revenue Cutter Service in both the Atlantic and Pacific preventing smuggling and protecting shipping. At the outbreak of the War with Spain, she was ordered to cooperate with the Navy 11 April 1898. Throughout the conflict, she patrolled the Pacific coast and was returned to the Treasury Department 15 August 1898. Grant continued to serve the Revenue Cutter Service in the Pacific until sold to A. A. Cragin of Seattle, Washington on 28 November 1906.

== Service history ==
United States Revenue Cutter Grant, often referred to as U. S. Grant, was an iron-hulled vessel built for the Revenue Cutter Service in 1870–1871, one of the few three-masted cutters ever in service. She was constructed by the Pusey and Jones Corporation at a cost of $92,500.

=== East coast service ===
The cutter entered service on 19 January 1872, was assigned to the New York station, with Revenue Captain George R. Slicer, in command. For the next two decades, Grant operated off the east coast from Block Island Sound to the mouth of the Delaware River.

On 23 May 1874, Grant helped ferry the Grant-Satoris wedding party, including the ship's namesake President Ulysses S. Grant, from West 24th Street in New York City to SS Baltic, on which the newly married couple travelled to England.

In the summer of 1877, Grant was the host ship for United States Secretary of the Treasury John Sherman's three-week tour of United States Lighthouses Board, United States Life-Saving Service, and United States Coast Survey facilities. Also on board was Webb C. Hayes, who was then serving as secretary for his father, President Rutherford B. Hayes. During this tour, the cutter rammed and sank the schooner Dom Pedro off Boon Island, with no loss of life.

On 11 July 1887, Grant was used during Queen Kapiolani's return visit to New York City, ferrying her and her party from Servia to shore. She repeated this honor in August, when New York City was visited by Prince Devanwongse, half-brother of the King of Siam, Chulalongkorn I.

Two years later, Grant participated in the 1889 Great Naval Parade, part of the Grand Centennial Celebration of the Inauguration of President Washington, held in New York Harbor on 30 April 1889. She was also witness to the launching of USS Maine on 18 November.

She was withdrawn from service on 29 September 1893 and refitted for duty in the Pacific. She departed New York on 6 December, bound for Port Townsend, Washington. En route, the revenue cutter called at Barbados; Bahia, Brazil; Montevideo, Uruguay; Valparaiso, Chile; Callao, Peru; San Diego and San Francisco, California, and arrived at Port Townsend on 23 April 1894, ending a voyage of 73 days and 20 hours.

=== West coast service ===
In the ensuing years, Grant operated out of Port Townsend, protecting the salmon fisheries and, when necessary, extending assistance to ships of the Bering Sea whaling fleet. She continued her peacetime routine in the Pacific Northwest into the late 1890s. Arriving at San Francisco on 7 April 1898, Grant was placed under Navy control four days later, on 11 April, as the United States girded for war with Spain. Retaining her Revenue Cutter Service crew, the cutter operated under Navy aegis as a unit of the Naval Auxiliary Service through July. Returned to the Treasury Department on 16 August 1898, Grant resumed her peacetime activities, patrolling the same northwest Pacific coastlines of Washington and Alaska which she had covered during her brief wartime naval service.

In early 1902, Grant assisted in the search for the lost HMS Condor. During this search, a ship's boat believed to belong to Condor was discovered at Ahousat. Captain Dorr F. Tozier, commanding Grant, traded the Indians, who had found the boat in December, his dress sword for it. In February, Tozier met with the captain of HMS Egeria, who recognized the boat as belonging to Condor and retrieved it. In 1906, the British government gifted Tozier a replacement sword, as a token of their appreciation "of the valuable and cordial assistance rendered" by him in the search for Condor. In the summer of that year, Grant was involved in the area wide manhunt for the Outlaw Tracy.

In October 1903, to assist with her anti-smuggling mission, Grant became the first United States revenue cutter to be fitted with a wireless telegraph device.

On 23 January 1906, the Pacific Coast Steamship Company's steamer Valencia became stranded off Cape Beale Light, near Vancouver Island, British Columbia. Of the 164 people on board, 126 perished in the tragedy. Grant assisted in operations to recover the bodies of the victims and later transported them to Seattle.

Grant conducted her last cruise in August 1906, patrolling the salmon fisheries off the Washington coast in the vicinity of Point Roberts, Washington. In September, Grant was determined in need of repair too costly to justify the expenditure. Subsequently taken out of service, the revenue cutter was sold on 28 November 1906 to A. A. Cragin, of Seattle for $16,300, after which she became the merchant vessel Grant.

Grant was subsequently sold to the San Juan Fishing & Packing Company who rebuilt her as a dory halibut fishing steamer. In September 1911, she helped rescue survivors of SS Ramona, a passenger steamer that ran aground near the Spanish Island, in Christian Sound, Alaska. Before the year was out, she suffered the same fate, wrecking on the rocks of Banks Island.
