= SS Valencia =

Passenger steamship (1882–1906)

Coordinates: 48°42′20″N 125°00′21″W

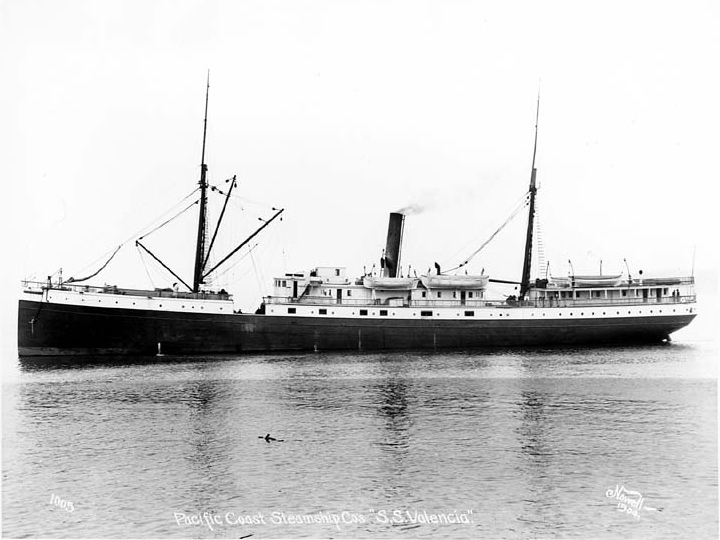
- SS Valencia in 1904

History

United States
- Name: Valencia
- Namesake: Valencia, Venezuela
- Owner: Red D Line; 1882–1898; Pacific Steam Whaling Company; 1898–1901; Pacific Coast Steamship Company; 1901–1906
- Operator: Red D Line; 1882–1897; 1897–1898; Ward Line; 1897; Pacific Steam Whaling Company; 1898; 1898–1901; United States Army; 1898; Pacific Coast Steamship Company; 1901–1906
- Port of registry: San Francisco, California, United States
- Route: New York City to Caracas via Laguayra and Puerto Cabello (in 1882); San Francisco, California to Alaska (Normal route); San Francisco, California to Seattle, Washington via Victoria, British Columbia(At the time of sinking)
- Builder: William Cramp & Sons, Philadelphia
- Yard number: 228
- Launched: 11 March 1882
- Maiden voyage: May 1882
- In service: 1882–1906
- Out of service: 22 January 1906
- Fate: Wrecked on 22 January 1906
- Notes: Ran aground near Pachena Point on Vancouver Island

General characteristics
- Type: Ocean liner/coastal passenger liner
- Tonnage: 1,598 Tons (originally 1,200 Tons)
- Length: 252 ft (77 m)
- Beam: 34 ft (10 m)
- Notes: Carried six lifeboats, one workboat, four life rafts and one dual purpose workboat. Also equipped with a lyle gun. A 100 ft (30 m) long bow gave the Valencia the false appearance of a fast vessel. It also reduced visibility during fog, as the ship was originally designed for east coast service. She was the sister ship to the Caracas.

SS Valencia was an iron-hulled passenger steamer built for the Red D Line for service between Venezuela and New York City. She was built in 1882 by William Cramp and Sons, one year after the construction of her sister ship Caracas. She was a 1,598-ton vessel (originally 1,200 tons), 252 feet (77 m) in length. In 1897, Valencia was deliberately attacked by the Spanish cruiser Reina Mercedes off Guantanamo Bay, Cuba. The next year, she became a coastal passenger liner on the U.S. West Coast and served periodically in the Spanish–American War as a troopship to the Philippines. Valencia was wrecked off Cape Beale, which is near Clo-oose, on the west coast of Vancouver Island, British Columbia, on 22 January 1906. As her sinking killed 100 people (including all of the women and children aboard), some classify the wreck of Valencia as the worst maritime disaster in the "Graveyard of the Pacific", a famously treacherous area off the southwest coast of Vancouver Island.

== History ==
=== East coast ===
The Red D Line had been operating a well-established sailing ship service to Venezuela since 1839. This service continued uninterrupted for almost 40 years. By the summer of 1879 however, the company decided to modernize its service with steamships. Three German vessels were leased to begin this service, but it soon became clear that a permanent fleet would need to be provided. Resulting from this decision, two steamships were ordered from William Cramp & Sons in Philadelphia. Both ships were to carry a combination of passengers, cargo and mail, sail under American Registration and be manned by American crews. In 1881, the first of this duo, the 1,200-ton Caracas, was completed and began service in July 1881 between New York City and Caracas via Laguayra and Puerto Cabello.

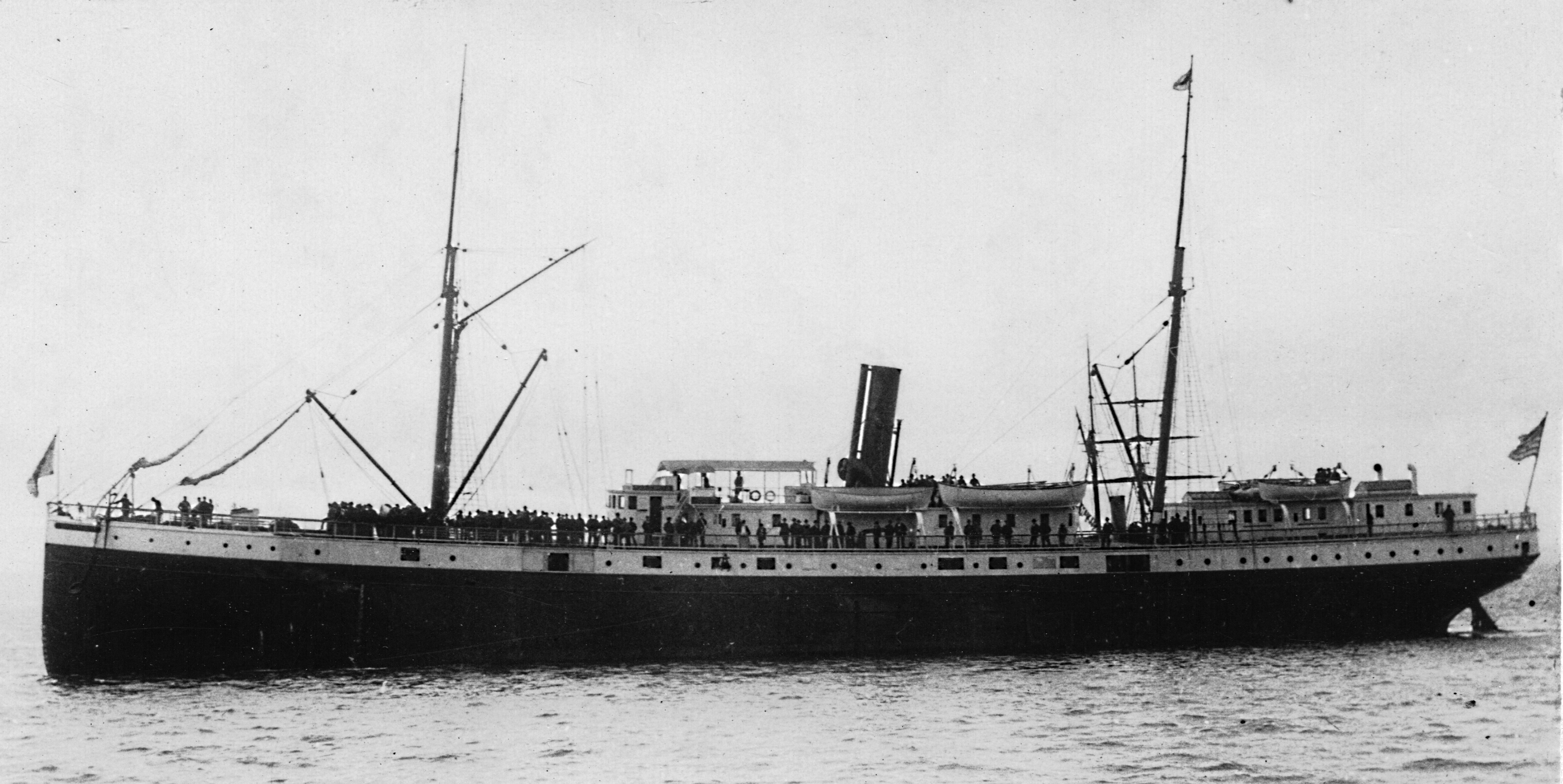
SS Valencia around 1900, showing much of her original Red D Line profile

In 1882, the sister ship of Caracas was completed. The new steamer, Valencia, was shorter in length than her older sister by 5 ft (2 m) and began her maiden voyage in May 1882. An extension service for Valencia and Caracas was provided by the small wooden steamship Maracaibo to the port of the wooden steamer's namesake. Unlike Valencia and Caracas, Maracaibo was registered under the British flag, as she did not operate into the United States. Voyages on Valencia and Caracas were scheduled twice a month, once for each ship, and lasted around 26 days. In 1888, Caracas was sold to Thomas Egenton Hogg of the Oregon Pacific Railroad Company and renamed Yaquina Bay. Valencia however, continued operations with the Red D Line. In later years, Valencia operated from New York City to Laguayra, via Puerto Cabello and the island of Curaçao.

In 1897, the liner Niagara of the Ward Line was laid up to undergo repairs. The Valencia was subsequently chartered from the Red D Line to temporarily take Niagara's place. Despite the charter, Valencia was still manned by her Red D Line crew. On 29 May 1897, the Valencia was purposely attacked by the Spanish cruiser Reina Mercedes. The cruiser fired two shots at the Valencia off Guantánamo Bay. One of the shots missed Valencia's stern by 240 ft (73 m) Immediately, the American flag was raised on Valencia's stern, preventing Reina Mercedes from firing any further shots. It was later revealed that the shots were fired by Reina Mercedes in order to intimidate Valencia into raising her colors. The crew of Reina Mercedes was otherwise well aware of Valencia's identity. Despite not being able to see the cruiser's flag, Valencia's captain was able to identify Reina Mercedes, as both ships were together in Santiago de Cuba only days before. A Spanish official claimed Reina Mercedes had every right to fire upon Valencia for not displaying her American flag, which violated maritime courtesy. In response an American official stated Reina Mercedes did not display her colors while attacking Valencia, making the attack unjustified.

=== West coast ===
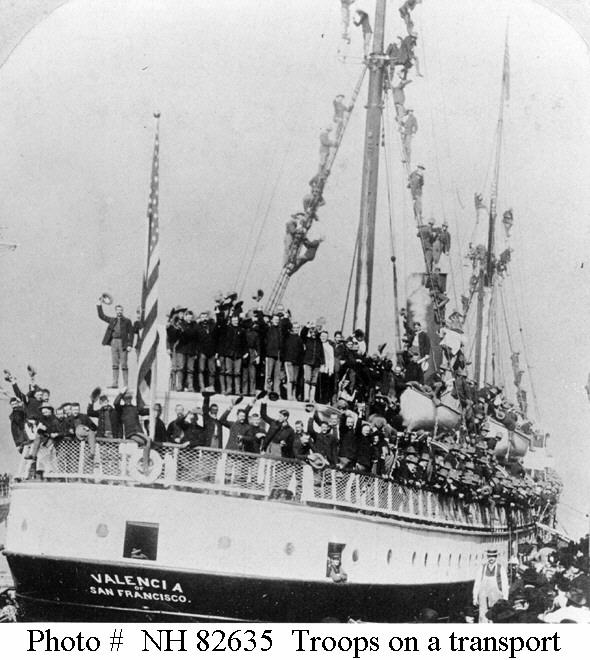
Valencia, carrying members of the 1st North Dakota Volunteer Infantry of the United States Army during the Spanish–American War

In 1898, Valencia was sold to the Pacific Steam Whaling Company, which brought her around Cape Horn to the United States West Coast. From here, she served between San Francisco, California and the Territory of Alaska. On 19 June of that year, Valencia was chartered by the United States Army for use as a troopship in the Spanish–American War. In this configuration, Valencia could carry 606 troops and 29 officers. She was used to transport the 1st North Dakota Volunteer Infantry, 1st Washington Volunteer Infantry (Companies F, G, I and L), and the California Heavy Artillery (Batteries A and D) between San Francisco and the Philippines. The Army paid Valencia's owners $650 (equivalent to $25,200 in 2025) a day for her lease.

==== Performance ====
After returning to civil service, Valencia did not adapt well to her new surroundings, and was not a well-liked ship among Pacific Coast passengers. She was regarded as being too small and too open to the elements, causing her to be classified as a second class vessel. Furthermore, her average speed was only 11 knots.

Her design made her difficult to handle during winter months. Valencia's lengthy 100 ft (30 m) bow, reduced visibility from her bridge. The very audible noise of the waves crashing along her bow often interfered with communication between her crew members.

The Valencia was not equipped with a double bottom and, like other early iron steamers, her hull compartmentalization was primitive.

==== Incidents ====
In 1901, Valencia's purser was arrested for overpricing tickets and embezzling the additional money. The purser claimed the rest of Valencia's crew was involved in this scam. In the same event, the Valencia was discovered to have been carrying more passengers than her permits allowed, causing her owners to be fined $9,000 (equivalent to $348,000 in 2025).

Following these scandals, Valencia was sold to the Pacific Coast Steamship Company.

While returning from Valdez, Alaska in 1902, Valencia collided with the steamer Georgia in Elliott Bay off Seattle, Washington. One of Valencia's hull plates was punctured above the water line. It was later discovered that had Valencia been damaged underwater by the collision, she would have foundered.

Carrying a crew of 62, three passengers, and 500 tons of general cargo on a voyage from Nome in the Territory of Alaska, Valencia ran aground without loss of life while entering the harbor at Saint Michael, Alaska, on 16 October 1905. After Valencia jettisoned an estimated 75 tons of cargo, the tug Meteor helped her free herself, and she resumed her voyage southward.

During the winter season, Valencia spent most of her time sitting at her dock in San Francisco, only seeing use as a backup vessel.

== Final voyage ==
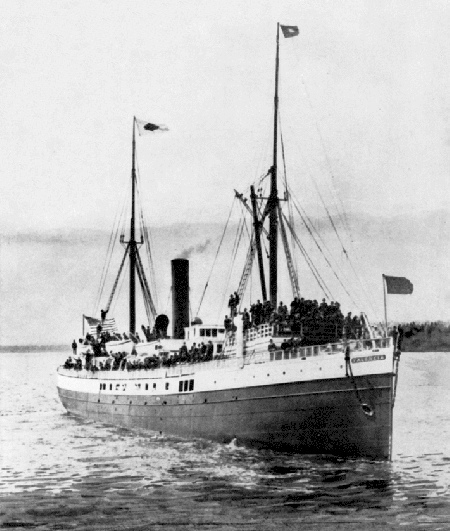
Valencia, circa 1905

In January 1906, the Valencia was temporarily diverted to the San Francisco–Seattle route to take over from the SS City of Puebla, which was undergoing repairs in San Francisco. The weather in San Francisco was clear, and Valencia set off on 20 January at 11:20 a.m. with nine officers, 56 crew members and at least 108 passengers aboard. As she passed by Cape Mendocino in the early morning hours of 21 January, the weather took a turn for the worse. Visibility was low and a strong wind started to blow from the southeast.

Unable to make celestial observations, the ship's crew was forced to rely on dead reckoning to determine their position. Out of sight of land, and with strong winds and currents, Valencia missed the entrance to the Strait of Juan de Fuca. Shortly before midnight on 22 January, she struck a reef 11 miles (18 km) off Cape Beale on the southwest coast of Vancouver Island.

=== After the collision ===
Immediately after the collision, a large wave lifted her off the reef, and crew members reported a large gash in the hull into which water was pouring rapidly. To prevent her from sinking, the captain ordered her run aground, and she was driven into the rocks again. She was left stranded in sight of the shore, separated from it by less than 100 yards (100 m).

In the ensuing confusion, all but one of the ship's seven lifeboats were lowered into the water against the captain's orders, all of them improperly manned. Three flipped while being lowered, spilling their occupants into the ocean; of the three that were successfully launched, two capsized and one disappeared. The scene at the wreck was horrific, as one of the few survivors, Chief Freight Clerk Frank Lehn recounted:

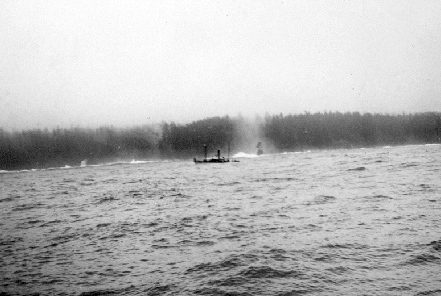
The wreck of Valencia, seen from one of the rescuing ships.

Screams of women and children mingled in an awful chorus with the shrieking of the wind, the dash of rain, and the roar of the breakers. As the passengers rushed on deck they were carried away in bunches by the huge waves that seemed as high as the ship's mastheads. The ship began to break up almost at once and the women and children were lashed to the rigging above the reach of the sea. It was a pitiful sight to see frail women, wearing only night dresses, with bare feet on the freezing ratlines, trying to shield children in their arms from the icy wind and rain.

Only twelve men made it to shore, and of those, three were washed away by the waves after landing. The remaining nine men scaled the cliffs and found a telegraph line strung between the trees. They followed the line through thick forest until they came upon a lineman's cabin, from which they were able to summon help. These nine men, who became known as the "Bunker" Party, after the survivor Frank Bunker, eventually received much criticism for not attempting to reach the top of the nearby cliff, where they might have received and made fast the cable fired from the Lyle gun on board Valencia.

Meanwhile, the ship's boatswain and a crew of volunteers had been lowered in the last remaining lifeboat with instructions to find a safe landing place and return to the cliffs to receive a lifeline from the ship. Upon landing, they discovered a trail and a sign reading "Three miles to Cape Beale". Abandoning the original plan, they decided to head toward the lighthouse on the cape, where they arrived after 2 1/2 hours of hiking. The lighthouse keeper phoned Bamfield to report the wreck, but the news had already arrived and been passed on to Victoria. This last group of survivors was "well-nigh crazed" by their last sight of the remaining passengers stranded on the ship:

the brave faces looking at them over the broken rail of a wreck and of the echo of that great hymn sung by the women who, looking death smilingly in the face, were able in the fog and mist and flying spray to remember: Nearer, My God, to Thee.

=== Rescue efforts ===
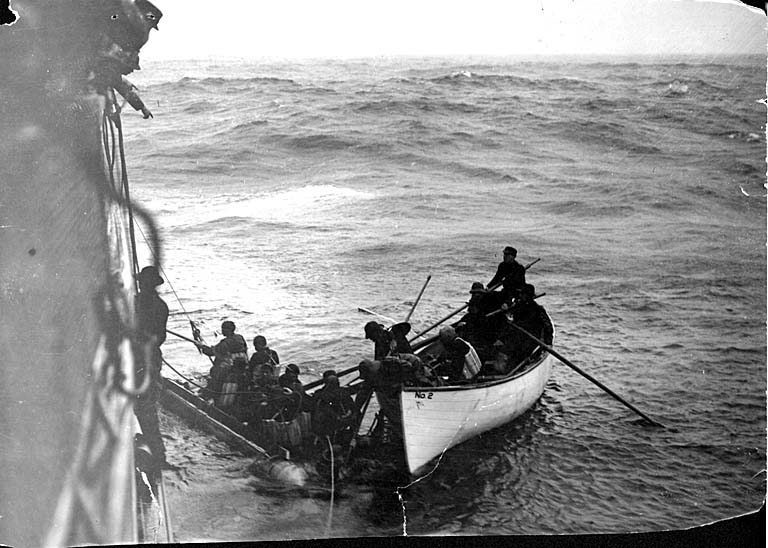
Survivors on a life raft being rescued by City of Topeka

Once word of the disaster reached Victoria, three ships were dispatched to rescue the survivors. The largest was the passenger liner SS Queen: accompanying her were the salvage steamer Salvor and the tug Czar. Another steamship, City of Topeka, was later sent from Seattle with a doctor, nurses, medical supplies, members of the press, and a group of experienced seamen. On the morning of 24 January, Queen arrived at the site of the wreck, but was unable to approach due to the severity of the weather and lack of depth charts. Seeing that it would not be possible to approach the wreck from the sea, Salvor and Czar set off to Bamfield to arrange for an overland rescue party.

Upon seeing Queen, Valencia's crew launched the ship's two remaining life rafts, but the majority of the passengers decided to remain on the ship, presumably believing that a rescue party would soon arrive. Approximately one hour later, City of Topeka arrived and, like Queen, was unable to approach the wreck. Topeka cruised the waters off the coast for several hours searching for survivors, and eventually came upon one of the life rafts carrying 18 men. No other survivors were found and at dark the captain of City of Topeka called off the search. The second life raft eventually drifted ashore on an island in Barkley Sound, where the four survivors were found by the island's First Nations and taken to a village near Ucluelet.

When the overland party arrived at the cliffs above the site of the wreck, they could see dozens of passengers clinging to the rigging and the few unsubmerged parts of Valencia's hull. Not long afterwards, the ship's lone funnel collapsed. With the funnel being the last full means of protection to anyone on board, the waves were now able to completely wash over Valencia's deck, leaving all at the mercy of the waves. Without any remaining lifelines, however, they could do nothing to help the survivors, and within hours a large wave washed the wreckage off the rocks and into the ocean. The remaining passengers drowned, were beaten to death against the rocks, or clung to wreckage as they were swept to sea, dying of hypothermia.

== Investigation and aftermath ==
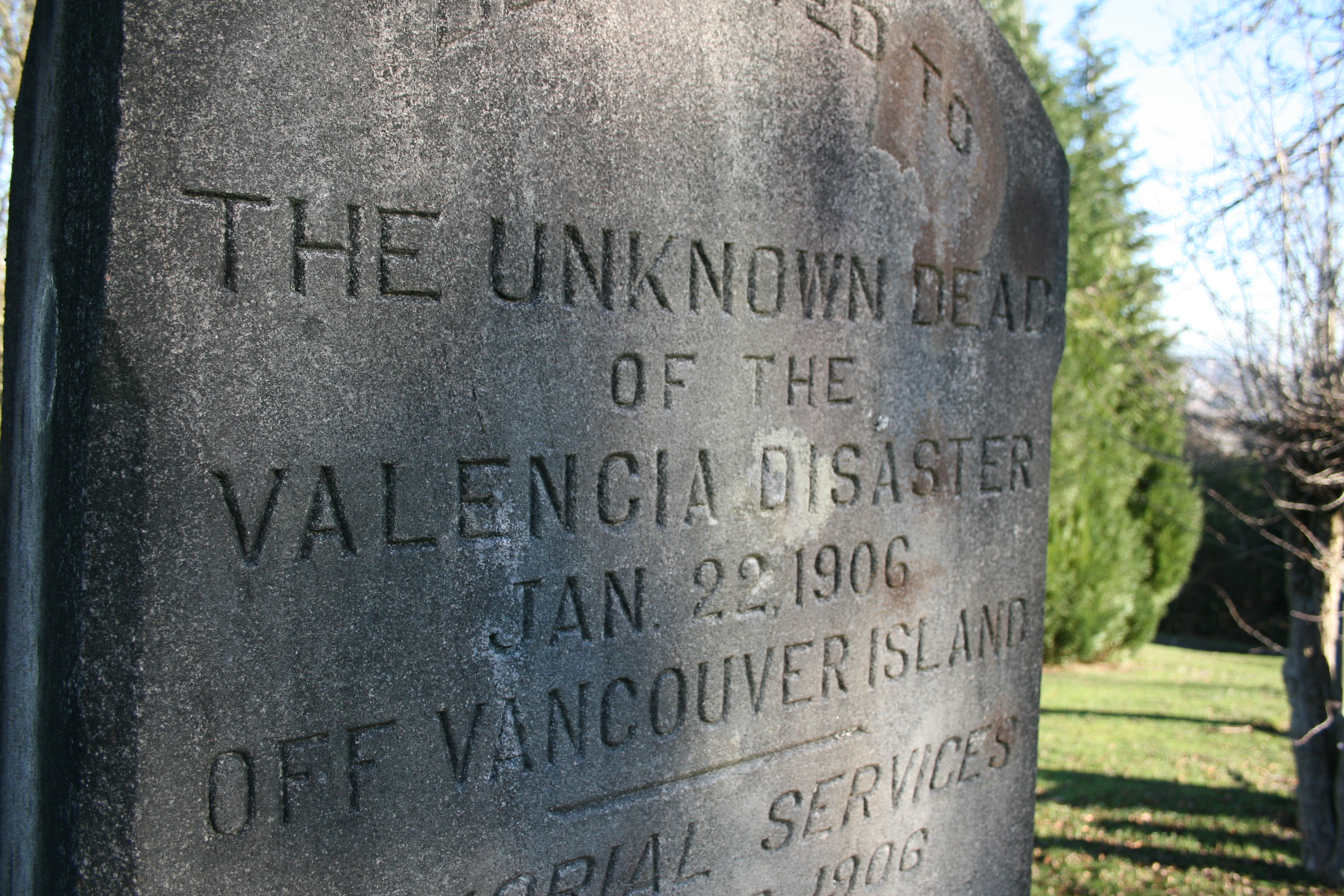
A headstone marking the remains of the unknown dead of the Valencia disaster, located in the Mt Pleasant Cemetery on Queen Anne Hill in Seattle, Washington

Within days of the disaster, the US Marine Inspection Service launched an investigation into the incident. A second investigation was launched by President Theodore Roosevelt. Its purpose was twofold: one, to determine the causes of the disaster, and two, to recommend how to avoid such loss of life in the future.

The investigation ran from 14 February to 1 March 1906, and the final report was published on 14 April 1906. The reports agreed on the causes of the disaster — navigational mistakes and poor weather. Safety equipment was, for the most part, in working order, but lifeboat drills had not been carried out. According to the report, the crew of the rescuing vessels did as much to help Valencia as could be expected under the circumstances.

The loss of life was attributed to a series of unfortunate coincidences, aggravated by a lack of lifesaving infrastructure along Vancouver Island's coast. The federal report called for the construction of a lighthouse between Cape Beale and Carmanah Point, and the creation of a coastal lifesaving trail with regularly spaced shelters for shipwrecked sailors. It also recommended that surfboats be stationed at Tofino and Ucluelet and that a well-equipped steamboat be stationed at Bamfield. The Government of Canada immediately set to work building a lighthouse and trail; in 1908, the Pachena Point Lighthouse was lit, and in 1911 work on the trail – later known as the West Coast Trail – was completed.

Estimates of how many people died in the sinking vary; some sources list that 117 people were killed, while others claim that the number of fatalities was as high as 181. According to the federal report, the official death toll was 136 persons. Only 37 men survived, and every woman and child on Valencia died in the disaster.

In 1933, 27 years after the disaster, Valencia's lifeboat No. 5 was found floating in Barkley Sound. Remarkably, it was in good condition, with much of the original paint remaining. The boat's nameplate is now on display in the Maritime Museum of British Columbia.

Coincidentally, Valencia's sister ship Caracas, was also wrecked. On 9 December 1888, shortly after arriving on the west coast as Yaquina Bay, she broke free from her tugboat, ran aground at the bay of her namesake and was declared a total loss.

=== Myths and legends surrounding Valencia ===
Valencia's dramatic end has made her the subject of several local rumors and ghost stories. Six months after the sinking, a local Nuu-chah-nulth fisherman, Clanewah Tom, and his wife reported seeing a lifeboat with eight skeletons in a nearby sea cave at the shoreline of Pachena Bay. The mouth of the cave was obstructed by a large boulder and the cave was reported to be around 200 ft (60 m) deep. There was no definite explanation for the lifeboat's presence in the cave, but it was believed that high tide had lifted the boat into the cave's mouth. Lightkeeper Philip Daykin, who managed to get a good look inside the cave, speculated the survivors were alive when the lifeboat entered the cave, but starved to death before it could be found. Due to the dangerous seas outside the cave's mouth, the lifeboat along with its human remains could not be recovered. Local resident Clay Evans, a member of the local Search and Rescue who has studied the Valencia sinking, believes the story to be apocryphal: however, if it is true, the lifeboat in question was likely No. 5, explaining its eventual rediscovery in 1933. Local fisherman similarly reported lifeboats being rowed by skeletons of Valencia's victims.

When transporting the survivors of Valencia to Seattle, City of Topeka stopped in the water to relay the news of Valencia's foundering to a passing vessel. Some observers onboard claimed they could make out the shape of Valencia within the black exhaust emanating from City of Topeka's funnel. In fact, while steaming to port with survivors, a ship approached her and passed close by. To the horror of all on board, it appeared to be the Valencia, and the crew on board skeletons. The phantom steamer was on the same course, heading straight for the rocks. The Valencia signaled the City of Topeka, which added to the terror of the people on board the Topeka. After the chilling experience, the Topeka continued on with no other incidents. In 1910, the Seattle Times reported that sailors claimed to have seen a phantom ship resembling Valencia near Pachena Point. The sailors observed waves washing over the phantom steamer as human figures held on to the ship's rigging for dear life. Similar apparitions were reported for years following the disaster.

== See also ==
- SS Caracas (1881) – sister ship of Valencia
- Clallam (steamboat)
- SS Columbia (1880)
- Princess Sophia (steamer)
- Pacific Rim National Park Reserve
