= Minnie Paterson =

Minnie Paterson (died 1911) was a Canadian heroine noted for her rescue of men from the barkentine (barque) Coloma during a severe storm in 1906 on the west coast of Canada's Vancouver Island in a region called the “Graveyard of the Pacific”.

Paterson was the wife of Tom Paterson, keeper of the Cape Beale Light near Bamfield, British Columbia. On December 6, 1906, Keeper Paterson spotted the crippled Coloma being battered by waves and 80 knot winds near shore. The telegraph line was broken, and the nearest hope was the lighthouse tender Quadra, six miles away on Bamfield Inlet. While Tom kept watch over the Coloma, Minnie went to seek help.

To reach the Quadra, Mrs. Paterson had to wade through icy, waist-deep seawater and mud, over toppled trees, through rain and hail; four hours later she finally reached Bamfield, and with the aid of another keeper's wife, they rowed a skiff out to alert the crew of the Quadra. Minnie insisted on immediately returning on foot to the lighthouse so that the mother of five could nurse her youngest unweaned baby. The Quadra eventually came to aid the Coloma, putting out a longboat just as the barque was breaking up. All on board were saved.

Coloma was not the only crippled vessel that Minnie Paterson aided in 1906, in January that same year, American passenger steamer Valencia had struck the rocks near Cape Beale in dense fog. The disaster claimed 117 lives and "Minnie Patterson spent 36 straight hours at the telegraph key during the ordeal, and she fed and cared for some of the survivors."

For her actions, Government of Canada presented Minnie with a gold watch and a silver plate along with a silver tea service from the Seattle Maritime Union. Minnie told a reporter she would have gladly given up the awards and the media attention to have not had the wrecks.

Five years after the wreck she developed tuberculosis and died, her health permanently weakened by her heroic efforts.
