= Curtis Christopherson =

Canadian executive

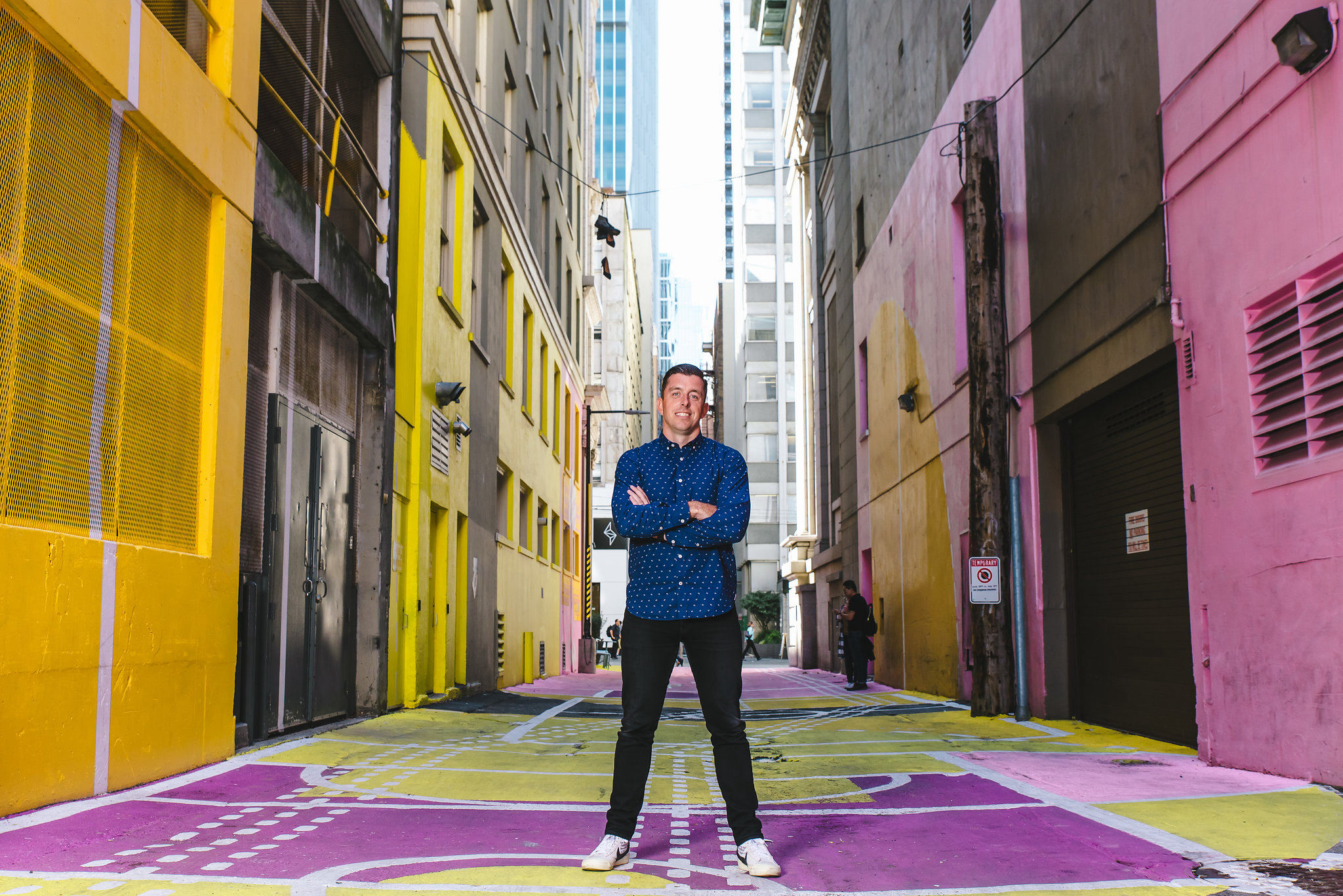
- Curtis Christopherson
- Education: Simon Fraser University
- Occupations: Business executive and entrepreneur

Curtis Christopherson is a Canadian business executive and entrepreneur. He is the founder of the connected-fitness platform WRKOUT, president and CEO of Innovative Fitness, and a partner and chief growth officer at Ammortal, a wellness company.

== Biography ==
Christopherson grew up in Canada and competed in multiple sports throughout high school, including water polo, track and field, volleyball, wrestling, and swimming. He received the Petro Canada Olympic Torch Scholarship.

He represented Canada in international water polo competitions and earned six national titles before the age of 20.

Christopherson graduated from Simon Fraser University.

=== Career ===
After university, Christopherson began his professional career at Innovative Fitness, where he worked in the personal training industry.

In 2021, during the COVID-19 pandemic, he founded WRKOUT, a connected-fitness platform offering live, interactive personal training sessions. The platform was launched as a short-term digital extension of premium coaching during a period of global disruption.

Christopherson later became a partner and chief growth officer at Ammortal, a company producing luxury recovery and wellness chambers used in professional sports facilities and luxury hotels.

He was a finalist for the Ernst and Young Canadian Entrepreneur of the Year.

== Athletic achievements ==
Christopherson has completed multiple endurance challenges, including multi-day ultramarathon stage races across the Sahara Desert in 2008 and Costa Rica in 2014. He has completed more than 17 marathons, beginning in 2005, including a sub-3:00 hr performance at the Berlin Marathon in 2011.

He has also achieved podium finishes in adventure racing, and completed several notable international endurance hikes, including the West Coast Trail in a single day in 2008, Machu Picchu in 2007, and Mount Kilimanjaro in 2009.

Christopherson participated in long-distance cycling expeditions across Canada in 2007and Australia in 2009, efforts that contributed to setting a Guinness World Record and raising more than $1.5 million for juvenile diabetes research.
