= West Coast Trail =

Backpacking trail in British Columbia, Canada

Coordinates: 48.664475°N 124.837621°W

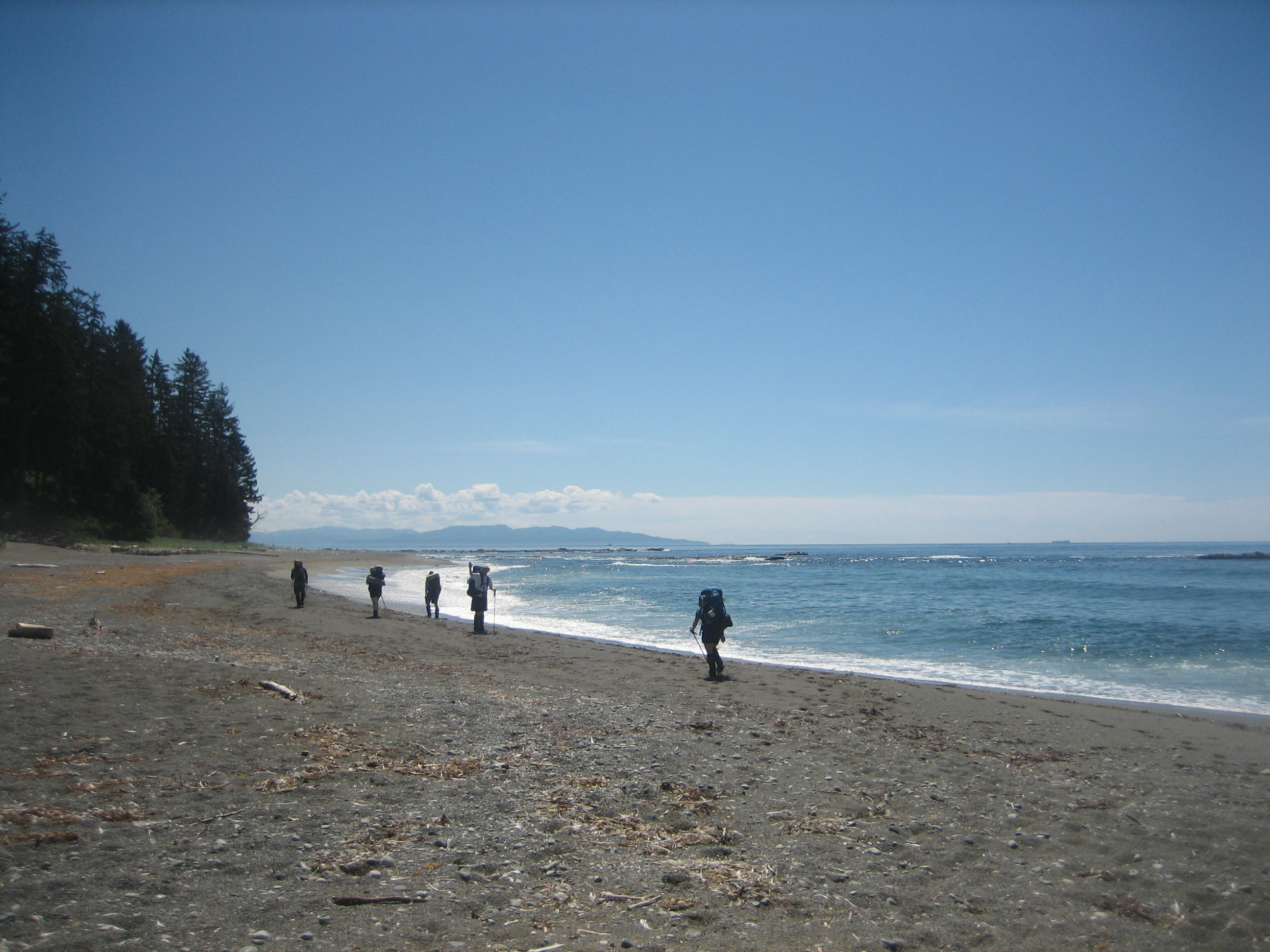
Hikers on the beach just south of the Carmanah Lighthouse

The West Coast Trail, originally called the Dominion Lifesaving Trail, is a 75 km (47 mi) backpacking trail following the southwestern edge of Vancouver Island in British Columbia, Canada. It was built in 1907 to facilitate the rescue of shipwrecked survivors along the coast, part of the treacherous Graveyard of the Pacific. It is now part of the Pacific Rim National Park and is often rated by hiking guides as one of the world's top hiking trails.

The West Coast Trail is open from May 1 until September 30 by reservation only.

== History ==
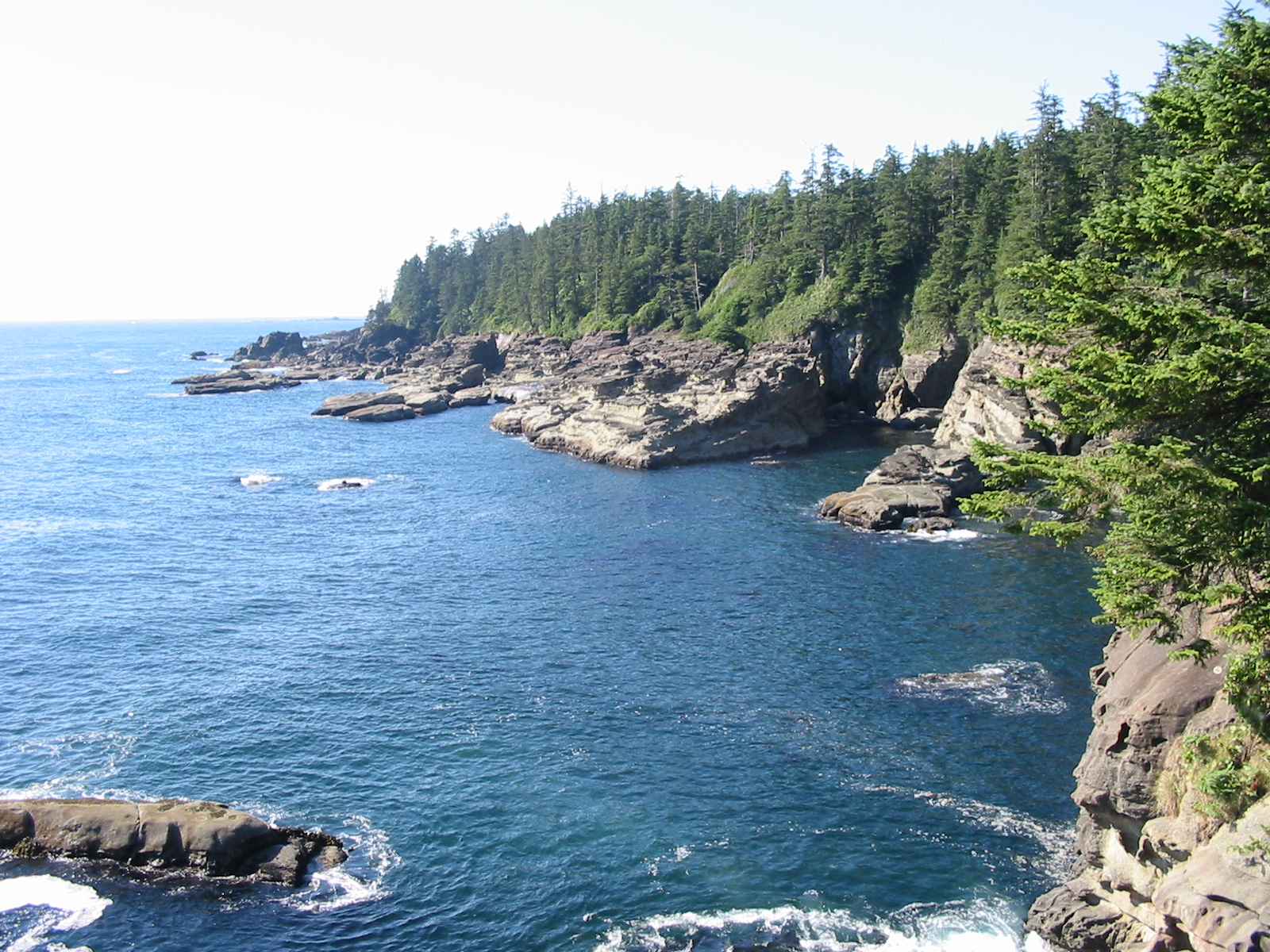
A view of the Pacific coast from the West Coast Trail

The West Coast Trail passes through the traditional territory of the Pacheedaht, Ditidaht, Huu-ay-aht, and Nuu-chah-nulth peoples, who have inhabited the area for more than 4,000 years. Native trails, used for trade and travel, existed in the area before European settlement.

In the 1800s, Europeans began to use the area to build and maintain a telegraph line between Victoria and Cape Beale. More ships began to travel past the west coast of Vancouver Island, particularly between San Francisco and Alaska. The reefs and breakers off the coast posed a serious danger to navigation. There were almost 500 shipwrecks around Vancouver Island alone, part of a series of Pacific Northwest wrecks that led to the region's nickname, the Graveyard of the Pacific

At the start of the 20th century, very little lifesaving infrastructure existed on the sparsely populated island. Although some plans were underway to improve the infrastructure, the public outcry that followed the wreck of the SS Valencia in January 1906 spurred the Canadian government to undertake a comprehensive plan for improvements, including:

- The construction of a new lighthouse at Pachena Point (12 km or 7.5 mi south of Bamfield), near where the Valencia had run aground.
- The introduction of wireless telegraphy on the BC coast through the construction of five wireless stations at Pachena Point, Estevan Point (where a lighthouse was added in 1910), Cape Lazo (near Comox, on the eastern coast of the island), Point Grey (in Vancouver), and Gonzales Hill (in Victoria). Only Pachena Point is located on the Dominion Lifesaving Trail. Each station was initially expected to have a range of about 150 km (93 mi), hence their spacing. The introduction of wireless service led to the rapid adoption of this technology by vessels plying the coastal trade.
- The construction of shelters at 8 km (5.0 mi) intervals on the trail, each with a telegraph and instructions in several languages, survival provisions including blankets and rations, and directions on navigating the trail.
- Establishment of the Bamfield Lifeboat Station. In 1908, the station was equipped with a state-of-the-art 36-foot (10.97 m) motor lifeboat built to a United States Lifesaving Service specification by the Electric Launch Company (Elco) of Bayonne, New Jersey. it was the world's first purpose-built motor lifeboat, and over the next half-century hundreds of similar boats were constructed for lifesaving stations in the US and Canada.

The trail allowed shipwreck survivors and rescuers to travel the forest making use of the telegraph line and cabins. In 1973 the trail became part of Pacific Rim National Park and has been continuously upgraded.

The trail passes through Indigenous reserves (Pacheedaht: Gordon River #2 & Cullite #3; Ditidaht: Carmanah #6, Claoose #4, Wyah #3 & Tsuquanah #2; Huu-ay-aht: Masit #13). In the 1970s, a lack of regulation resulted in hikers trespassing on culturally important and environmentally sensitive First Nations archaeological sites, such as villages and refuges on Reserve lands. Hikers are now required to remain on the trail when passing through reserves. To accommodate the growing interest in off-trail historical sites, the Ditidaht First Nation offers guided adventure tours through their traditional lands.

Canadian Coast Guard Station Bamfield is still in operation and hosts the CCG's Rigid Hull Inflatable Operator Training School.

== Description ==
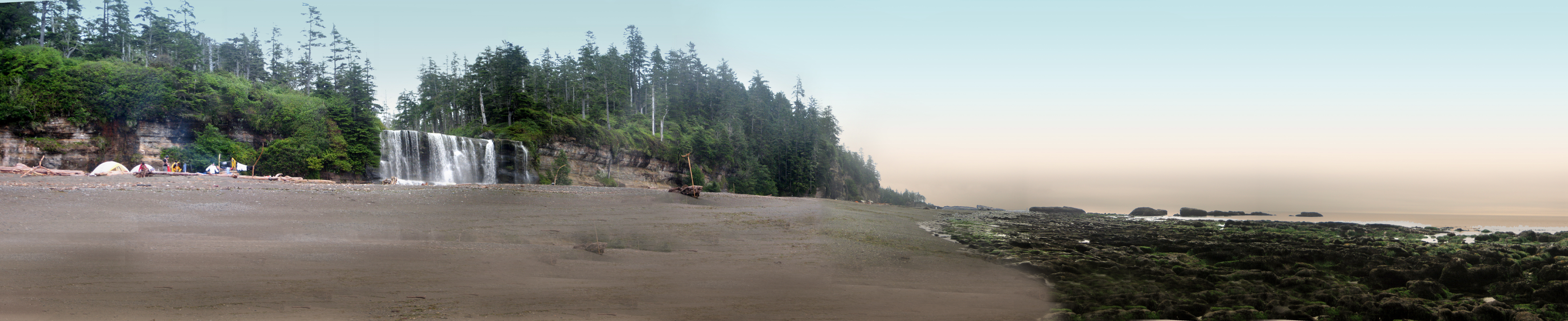
Tsusiat Falls, a major campground on the trail

The trail starts at Bamfield near Barkley Sound and runs south to Port Renfrew on Port San Juan Bay. In 1902, Bamfield became the North America terminus of the All Red Line's Pacific submarine cable, which spanned the globe linking the British Empire. A trail was constructed to carry the line south to Victoria (and thence across Canada to link up with the Transatlantic telegraph cable at Heart's Content, Newfoundland), as well as providing telegraph service to the lighthouses at Cape Beale (on Barkley Sound) and Carmanah Point (27 km or 17 mi north of Port Renfrew, at the mouth of the Strait of Juan de Fuca).

Hikers can choose to begin the trail in Port Renfrew and travel north, in Bamfield and travel south, or the Nitinaht Narrows entering via Water Taxi from Balaats’adt (Nitinaht Village) which costs 70 Canadian dollars as of 2025. The southern parts of the trail are far more challenging than the flatter area in the north. Overnight hikers must buy a permit which as of 2025 is 25.75 Canadian dollars, as only a set number of people are allowed to be on the trail at any one time. However, individuals are permitted to visit during the day at no expense.

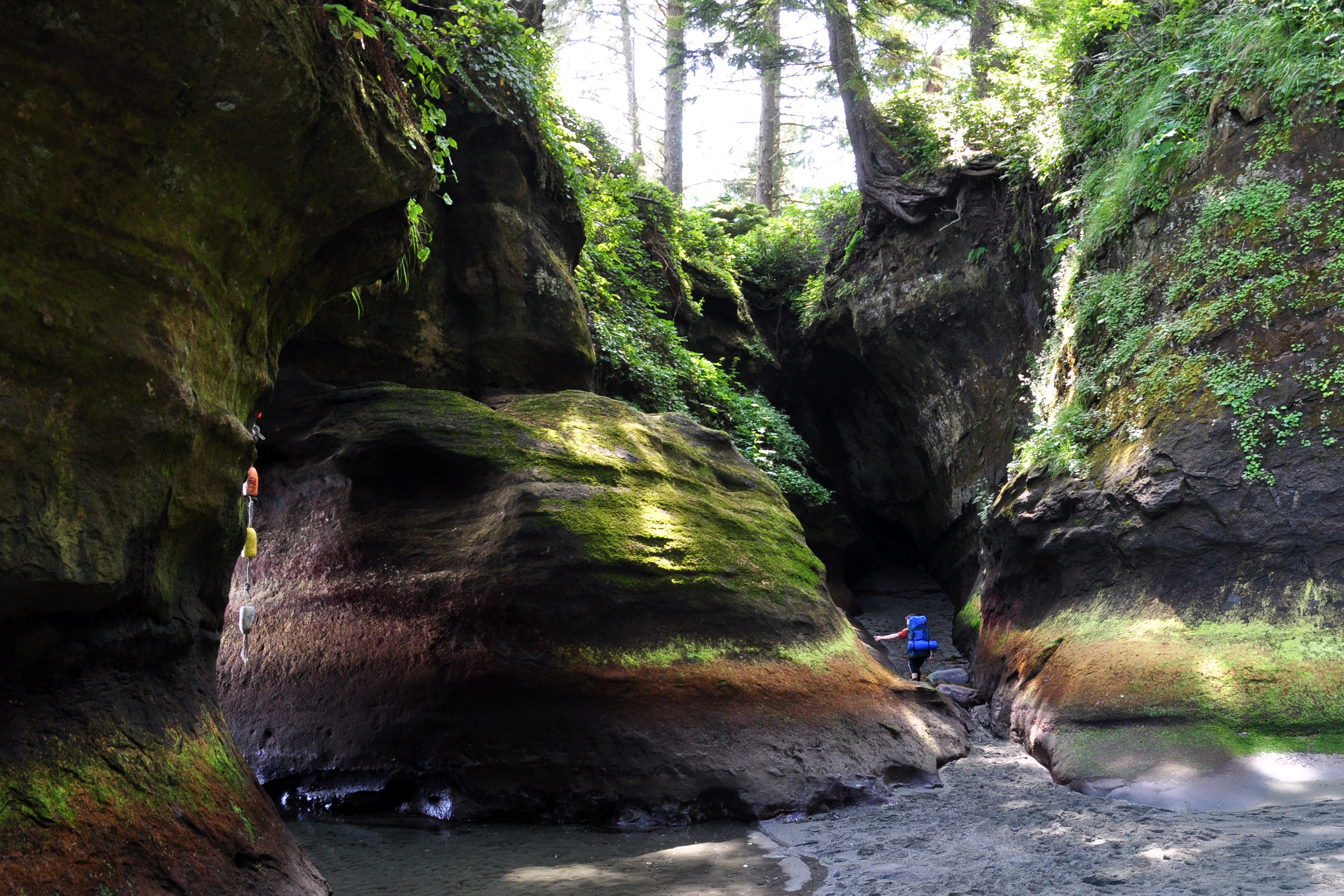
Colourful intertidal rock formations at Owen Point

The trail itself winds through forests, bogs, slippery moss-covered ladders, and beach treks. Hikers have a choice in parts of the trail to stay in the highlands, which is much boggier, or try to make progress on the beach, which is slow, but easier on the feet. The trail passes old growth trees, waterfalls, streams and thick patches of deep mud. Along the coast, the trail includes sand and pebble beaches, headlands, and exposed shelf and boulders at low tide. The trail often diverts inland to avoid dangerous surge channels and impassable headlands, where cliffs descend straight into the sea even at low tide. Portions of the beach sections can be made impassable by high tides. Tide tables and maps are issued by Parks Canada staff to all hikers prior to starting the trek. In some inland areas the trail consists of a boardwalk, which can be in disrepair and covered with moss and mud.

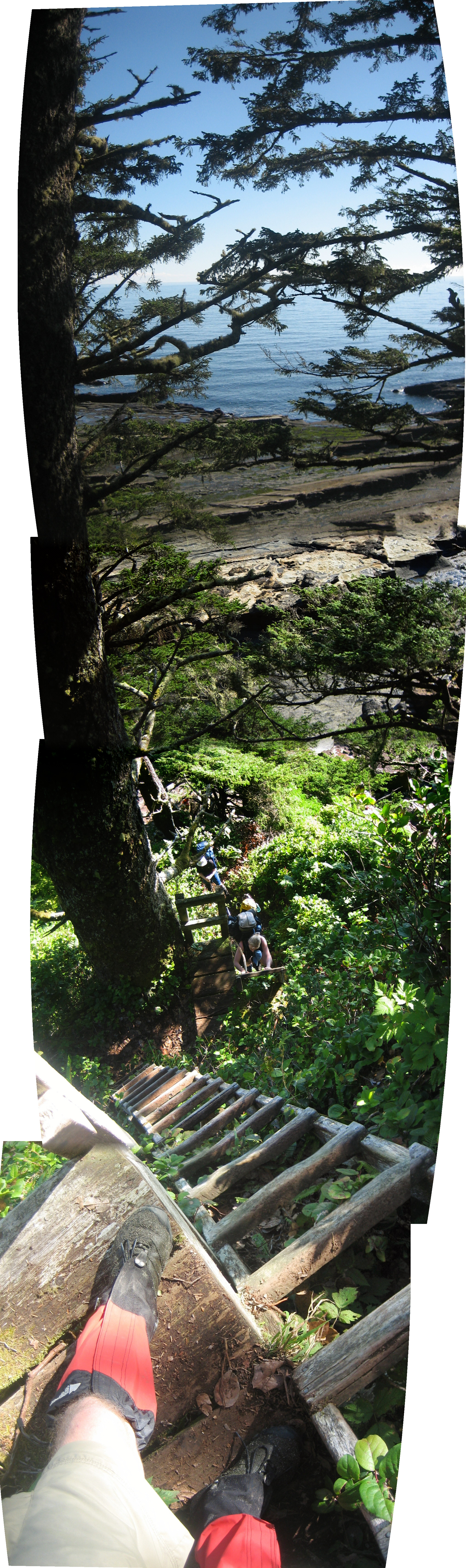
One of many ladder series on the trail

The main designated campgrounds along the way feature bear boxes for safe storage of food, an outhouse, and a view of the Pacific Ocean and Olympic Peninsula when the sea fog is not present. This fog offers a unique perspective as the beach and sky are clear, while the view just off shore is blocked. There are also numerous smaller campsites along the trail, with varying amenities, which can offer a quieter experience away from the often crowded main campsites. As 30 people may start the trail from each direction each day, it is not unusual to find many groups of hikers spending the night at any given main campsite.

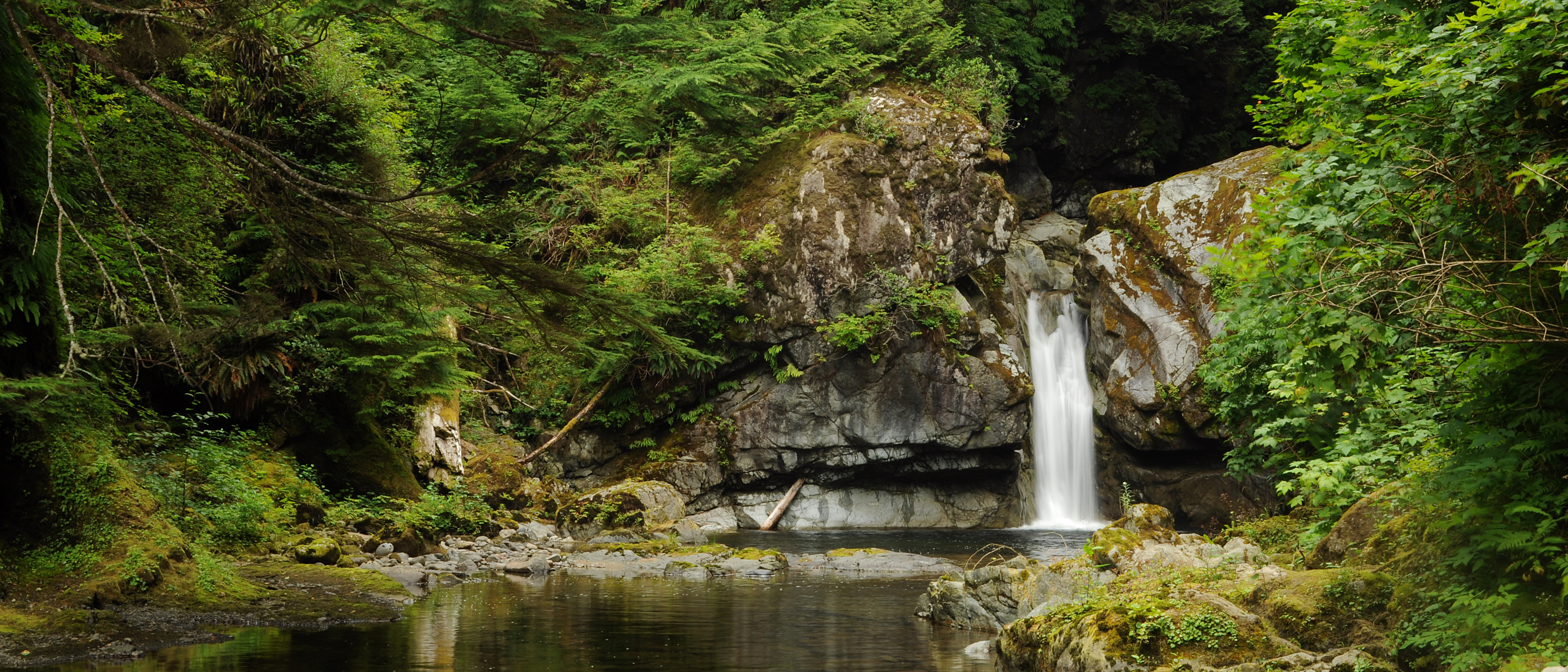
Waterfall on the Darling River

The trail is still extremely rugged and requires a high level of fitness, knowledge, and skill to complete, although in the last 10 to 15 years it has been upgraded to facilitate easier hiking and safety for those with less experience. This has changed the nature and challenge of the trail somewhat but has made it easier for hikers to explore the coast. It has been recommended that hikers travel in groups as a measure of safety, but some also hike the trail solo. To cross the larger rivers and streams hikers must ride cable car suspensions, while smaller or slower waterways are bridged only by fallen logs or may even require wading. There are two waterways that require a boat to cross: the Gordon River, at the southern trailhead, and the Nitinat Narrows, near the midpoint of the trail. A ferry service is operated by the local First Nation. The trail includes some three dozen ladder structures, some of them 30 feet (9.1 m) high, that hikers must ascend or descend. Hikers usually take an average of 7 days to complete the trip, allowing visitors to stop at some point for a day, although it has been run in a single day. Approximately 6000 backpackers complete the trail every year, with 1–2% requiring emergency evacuation due to injury, illness, or hypothermia.

There are two locations on the trail where food can be bought: 1) the ferry operator, Carl Edgar Jr, at Nitinat Narrows at km 32 has fresh seafood, a choice between salmon and crabs, baked potatoes and corn; 2) Nytom (Formerly Chez Monique's - see "Chez Moniques History" below) on the beach, just south of the Carmanah Lighthouse, sells mostly burgers. Both locations also sell soft drinks. Other than these two locations, hikers must be entirely self-sufficient and prepared for the back country conditions of the trail. Hiking the West Coast Trail is a major attraction for adventure seekers coming to British Columbia to experience the Pacific Northwest's scenery, wildlife, culture, and weather. The West Coast Trail remains one of the most famous trails in Canada.

Transportation services are available at both ends of the trail via Trail Bus or float plane. Hikers who do not wish to complete the trail can also take a water taxi at Nitinat Narrows to the other end of Nitinat Lake, but this is a time-consuming process as the taxi will normally only transport hikers who wish to leave the trail after 5:00 pm as it is used before then to allow hikers to cross from north to south or the reverse and land travel is slow and tedious.

The distance of the trail, whilst officially listed at 75 km, has not been changed or updated by Parks Canada for many years after being re-routed numerous times. Trail distance also changes depending on beach or forest travel, and some distance markers repeat themselves. GPS tracks from various hikers have put the true distance between 80 km and 92 km.

== Wildlife ==
Wildlife that can be encountered include cougars, black bears, wolves, hummingbirds, orcas, gray whales, seals, sea lions, and eagles. There are also abundant tidal pools on the beach portions, where hikers can see a variety of mollusk, sea anemones, and fish. Hikers are told how to react to possible encounters with dangerous animals (cougars, bears, and wolves) at the mandatory orientation session prior to starting the trail.

During certain times of the year, there is the possibility of encountering seal pups on the beach. The pups should not be approached, as the mother may then abandon the pup. All wildlife on the trail should only be viewed from a safe distance.

== Winter 2006/2007 damage ==
In January 2007, it was revealed that intense storms during the previous weeks had severely damaged the trail. The full extent of the damage was not initially known, but an estimated 3,000 trees had been downed, a bridge and cable car were destroyed, and a serious landslide at kilometer 12 was discovered. In March, C$500,000 in extra funding from the federal government was announced to assist with the cleanup. The trail now features many rebuilt walkways, ladders, and bridges replacing those that were destroyed by the storm. However, as structures deteriorate quickly in the wet coastal conditions, fallen trees and slippery boardwalk are still commonly encountered.

== Ladders, cable cars and bridges ==
There are 5 cable cars providing access across rivers when unsafe to ford: Camper Creek [KM62], Cullite Creek [KM58], Walbran Creek (Longest) [KM53], Carmanah Creek [KM46] and Klanawa River [KM19].

There are 4 bridges of significance: Logan Creek Suspension Bridge (Completed in 2019 and 113m long and 40m above the creek) [KM56], Cheewhat Suspension Bridge [KM36], Billy Goat Creek Suspension Bridge [KM17.5] and Tsocowis Creek Suspension Bridge [KM17].

The West Coast Trail App published data from an audit in 2023 documenting 109 ladders and 2673 individual rungs on the trail. Note: This does not include shorter less significant ladders of 3-4 rungs used to exit small bridge structures.

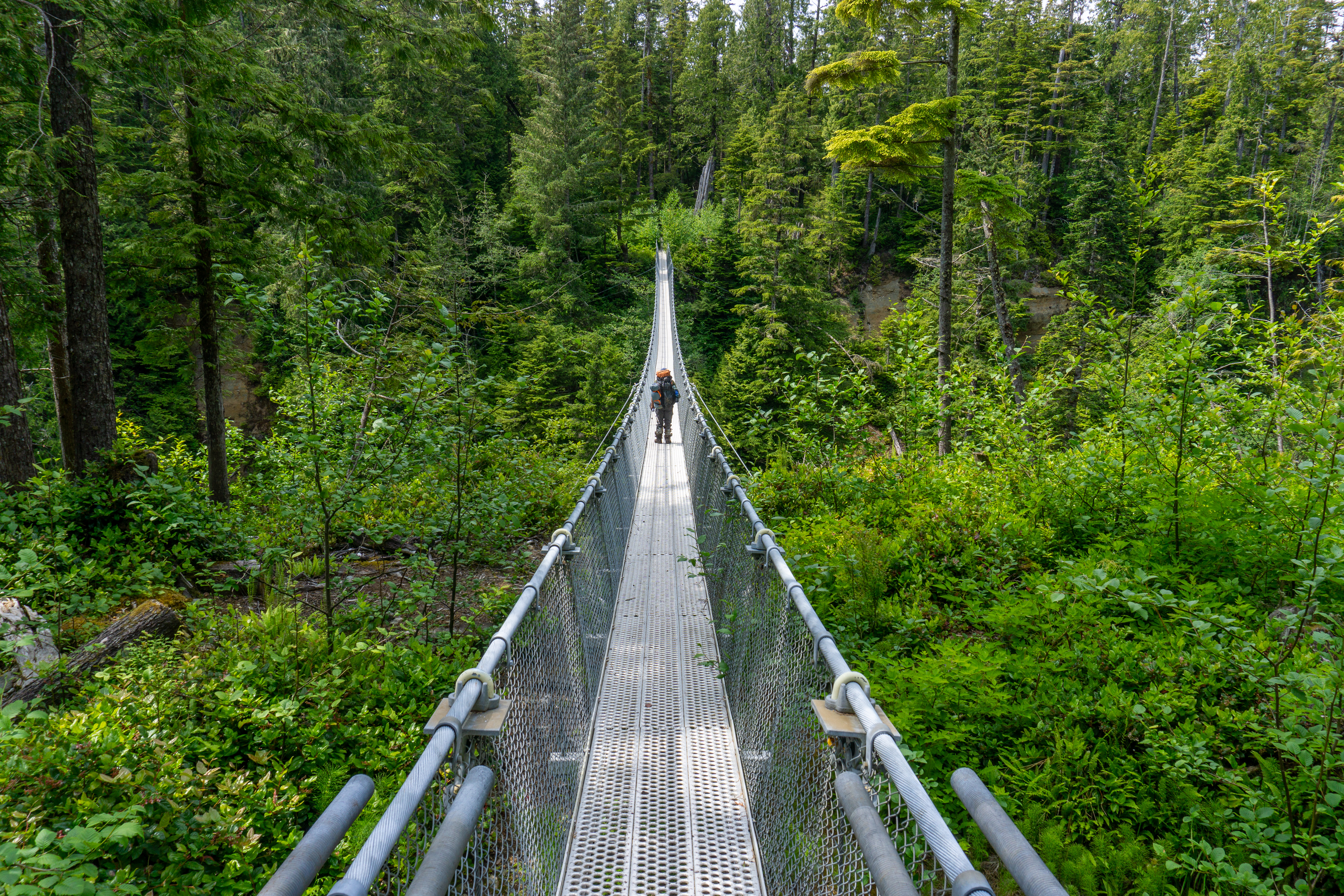
Logan Creek Suspension Bridge

== Chez Moniques history ==
Starting in 1993 Chez Moniques began selling hotdogs and soda to hungry hikers from a tarp shelter. After 24 years, the burger shack run by Peter and Monique Knighton (the anglicized form of Nytom) had become a recognized and welcome stop on the West Coast Trail. Monique passed away on Dec 31st, 2017, at the age of 78. Barely 6 months later Peter, also 78, was killed when the boat he used to bring supplies in from Port Renfrew capsized in rough seas. Since 2022 - Nytom is now run by Katrina Knighton, grand daughter of Peter, who has to bring in supplies on her back instead of a boat, therefore she is there some days but away on a supply run on other days.

== Pachena and Carmanah lighthouse de-staffing ==
In July 2024 the Canadian Coast Guard announced plans to cease lightkeeper operations on the two light stations located on the West Coast Trail. Citing geotechnical concerns and unstable ground, the Canadian Coast Guard announced plans to move the lightkeepers off site by winter 2024 and the heritage buildings will continue under the care of Fisheries and Oceans Canada.

Over their 100+ year history, lightkeepers have played an important role in hiker safety and rescue on the trail. The lightkeeper union has raised concerns of a lack of consultation with key stakeholders including local First Nations and a petition has been formed to delay the de-staffing until a firm plan for the future of the lighthouses can be established.

== See also ==
- Juan de Fuca Marine Trail
- History of the west coast of North America
