= Cape Beale Light =

Lighthouse in British Columbia, Canada

Cape Beale Lighthouse
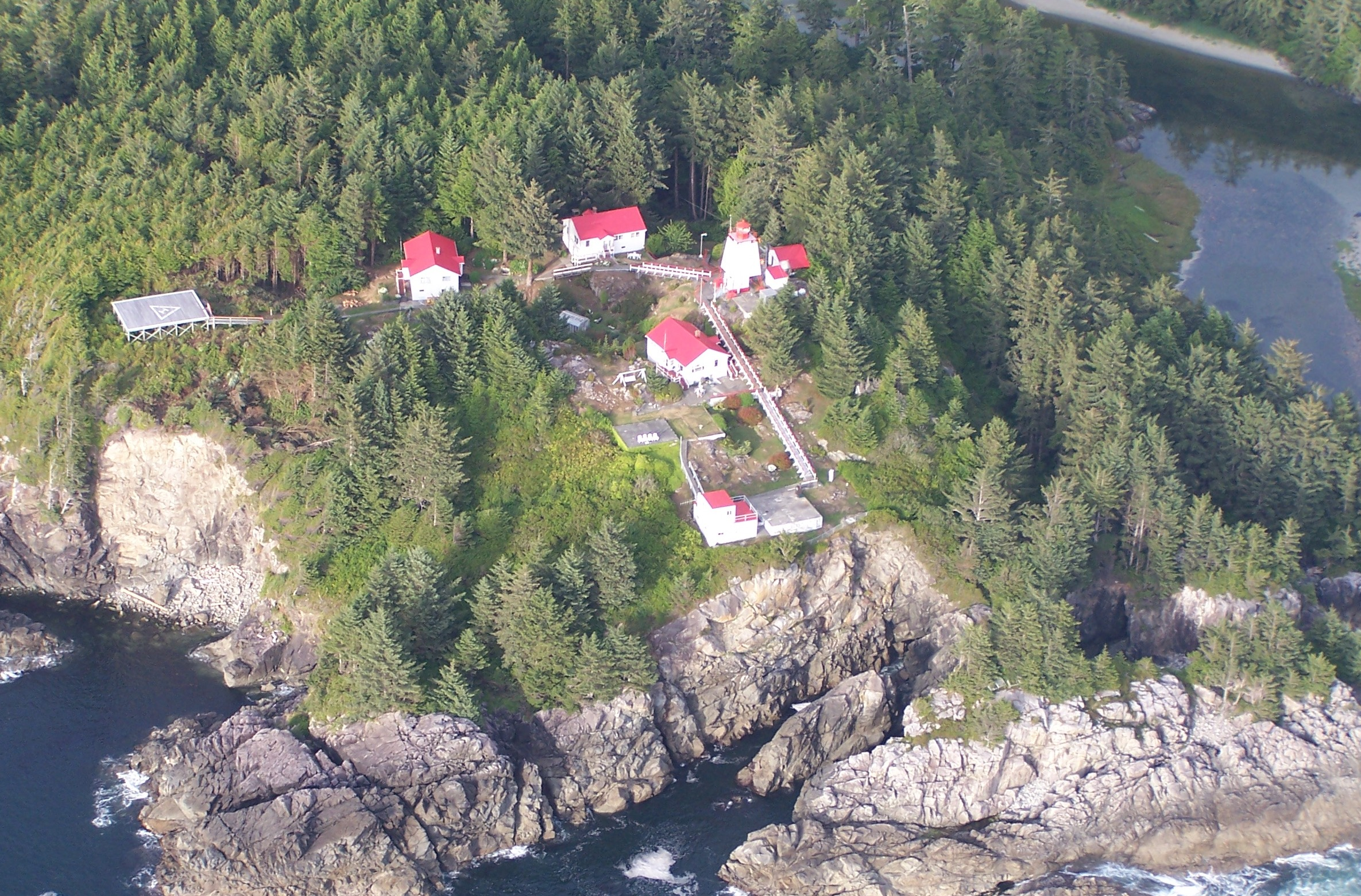
- Cape Beale Lighthouse
- Location: Cape Beale; Vancouver Island; British Columbia; Canada
- Coordinates: 48°47′11″N 125°12′56″W

Tower
- Constructed: 1874 (first)
- Construction: steel skeletal tower
- Height: 10 metres (33 ft)
- Shape: square pyramidal tower with balcony and lantern, central cylinder, slatted daymarks on three sides
- Markings: red tower and lantern
- Operator: Canadian Coast Guard
- Heritage: heritage lighthouse

Light
- First lit: 1958 (current)
- Focal height: 48 metres (157 ft)
- Characteristic: Fl WR 5s.

Cape Beale Lightstation is an active staffed lighthouse on Vancouver Island in British Columbia, Canada.

== History ==
The lighthouse was built in 1874 and its focal plane is 51 meters above sea level. The present tower was built in 1958 and marks the entrance to Barkley Sound. It is 10 metres tall. Cape Beale received its name from Charles William Barkley, captain of the Imperial Eagle, who named it for his ship's purser, John Beale. The lighthouse is best known for its proximity to the West Coast Trail which is the theoretical route survivors of shipwrecks would take to get to the nearby community of Bamfield.

In 1906, Minnie Paterson, the wife of Tom Paterson, keeper of the Cape Beale Light, helped rescue everyone on board the crippled barque Coloma during a severe storm. For her actions, Government of Canada presented Minnie with a gold watch and a silver plate along with a silver tea service from the Seattle Maritime Union. Minnie told a reporter she would have gladly given up the awards and the media attention to have not had the wrecks.

From 1971 to 1998, the Cape Beale Light was part of the British Columbia Shore Station Oceanographic Program, collecting coastal water temperature and salinity measurements for the Department of Fisheries and Oceans everyday for 27 years.

== Geography and climate ==
Cape Beale Light has a rainy and mild Oceanic climate (Köppen: Cfb; Trewartha: Dolk).

Climate data for Cape Beale Light Coordinates 48°47′10″N 125°12′58″W; elevation: 25.9 m (85 ft); 1991–2020 normals, extremes 1984–present
Month	Jan	Feb	Mar	Apr	May	Jun	Jul	Aug	Sep	Oct	Nov	Dec	Year
Record high °C (°F)	15.5 (59.9)	18.0 (64.4)	20.0 (68.0)	21.5 (70.7)	25.5 (77.9)	34.5 (94.1)	30.0 (86.0)	32.0 (89.6)	30.0 (86.0)	24.0 (75.2)	17.5 (63.5)	14.0 (57.2)	34.5 (94.1)
Mean daily maximum °C (°F)	8.4 (47.1)	8.9 (48.0)	9.8 (49.6)	11.5 (52.7)	13.9 (57.0)	15.4 (59.7)	16.8 (62.2)	17.0 (62.6)	16.4 (61.5)	13.4 (56.1)	10.4 (50.7)	8.4 (47.1)	12.5 (54.5)
Daily mean °C (°F)	6.1 (43.0)	6.2 (43.2)	7.1 (44.8)	8.6 (47.5)	11.1 (52.0)	12.8 (55.0)	14.1 (57.4)	14.3 (57.7)	13.6 (56.5)	10.8 (51.4)	7.9 (46.2)	5.9 (42.6)	9.9 (49.8)
Mean daily minimum °C (°F)	3.6 (38.5)	3.5 (38.3)	4.2 (39.6)	5.8 (42.4)	8.3 (46.9)	10.1 (50.2)	11.3 (52.3)	11.6 (52.9)	10.7 (51.3)	8.2 (46.8)	5.3 (41.5)	3.5 (38.3)	7.2 (45.0)
Record low °C (°F)	−6.5 (20.3)	−10.0 (14.0)	−3.0 (26.6)	0.5 (32.9)	2.0 (35.6)	4.0 (39.2)	4.0 (39.2)	7.5 (45.5)	5.0 (41.0)	−2.5 (27.5)	−9.0 (15.8)	−8.0 (17.6)	−10.0 (14.0)
Average precipitation mm (inches)	429.6 (16.91)	263.1 (10.36)	290.3 (11.43)	216.5 (8.52)	114.9 (4.52)	98.5 (3.88)	52.1 (2.05)	84.9 (3.34)	121.3 (4.78)	287.7 (11.33)	431.3 (16.98)	386.6 (15.22)	2,776.8 (109.32)
Average rainfall mm (inches)	422.9 (16.65)	260.7 (10.26)	288.5 (11.36)	216.4 (8.52)	114.9 (4.52)	98.5 (3.88)	52.1 (2.05)	84.9 (3.34)	121.3 (4.78)	283.9 (11.18)	430.0 (16.93)	383.5 (15.10)	2,757.5 (108.56)
Average snowfall cm (inches)	2.3 (0.9)	2.4 (0.9)	1.9 (0.7)	0.0 (0.0)	0.0 (0.0)	0.0 (0.0)	0.0 (0.0)	0.0 (0.0)	0.0 (0.0)	0.0 (0.0)	1.4 (0.6)	3.5 (1.4)	11.4 (4.5)
Average precipitation days (≥ 0.2 mm)	22.7	19.0	23.0	19.8	15.4	13.1	11.3	12.8	14.7	20.4	23.9	23.4	221.4
Average rainy days (≥ 0.2 mm)	22.6	18.8	22.9	19.8	15.4	13.1	11.3	12.8	14.7	20.3	23.6	23.2	220.4
Average snowy days (≥ 0.2 cm)	0.70	0.76	0.65	0.03	0.0	0.0	0.0	0.0	0.0	0.04	0.44	0.69	3.3
Source: Environment and Climate Change Canada Canadian Climate Normals 1991–2020

== See also ==
- List of lighthouses in Canada
- List of lighthouses in British Columbia
- Graveyard of the Pacific
- SS Valencia
