= Clo-oose =

- Location of Clo-oose in British Columbia Clo-oose (British Columbia)
- Coordinates: 48°39′00″N 124°49′00″W
- Country: Canada
- Province: British Columbia
- Region: Vancouver Island
- Regional District: Cowichan Valley

Clo-oose (Nuu-chah-nulth tluu7uus) is an area adjacent to the mouth of the Cheewhat River on the west coast of southern Vancouver Island, British Columbia. Within the Pacific Rim National Park Reserve, the former steamboat stop is by road and trail about 102 kilometres (63 mi) south of Port Alberni and 119 kilometres (74 mi) west of Duncan.

== First Nations ==
Part of the traditional territory of what the federal government designates the Ditidaht First Nation, the main villages were 3 kilometres (2 mi) north at Whyac, and 7 kilometres (4 mi) south at Qua-ba-diwa (Carmanah). During First Nations travel and trade by canoe between these and other villages along this coast, Clo-oose was a stopping point. The name means camping beach or landing place. Alternative meanings have been suggested.

In 1791, the people were already marked with smallpox scars when the Columbia called. The combined tribal population at Whyack and Clo-oose was 198 by 1906, but less than 30 by 1964. In the early 1900s, the Indian Department encouraged the Ditidaht-speaking peoples of the area to consolidate their settlements at Clo-oose, which was supplied by a coastal steamboat, visiting every 10 days. When this service ceased in 1952, many left. Federal initiatives in the 1960s led to consolidation at the head of Nitinat Lake, where logging roads from Port Alberni or Lake Cowichan provided access. The move coincided with talks about creating a national park, which would encompass Clo-oose, where some tribal members continued to spend part of the year.

== Former European community ==
Europeans had visited the area since the maritime fur trade in the 1700s, but the first settler was G.F. Groves. In 1892, he purchased land on the Cheewhat River, raised cattle, and ran a store/trading post. Meeting newcomers David and Sarah Logan in Victoria in 1894, he persuaded the couple to manage the operation while he went home on a visit to Australia, but Groves never returned. That year, Rev. William. J. Stone established a Methodist mission. Daughter, Gwendolyn Hoop-Kwis-Tuck (1898–1996), was the first non-native born in the community. Around 1906, Rev. Charles Docksteader replaced Stone.

David Logan was the inaugural postmaster 1911–1938, a role commonly performed by a storeowner in such places. He was also a justice of the peace, telegraph linesman, and raised cattle. From 1913, the handful of Europeans at Clo-oose were augmented by dozens of new settlers, who set up tents, built log cabins, and believed prosperity awaited. Their new subdivision was called Clovelly, but Clo-oose remained the postal address.

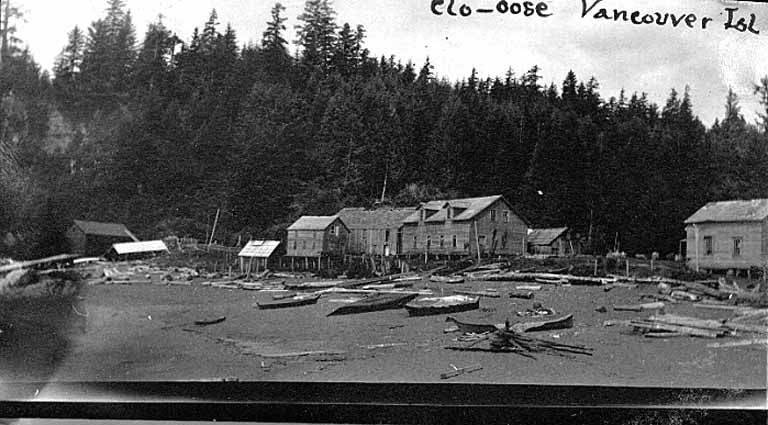
Beach at Clo-oose, BC, 1909

The absence of a safe harbour made the building of a pier pointless. Weather and rough seas affected the arrival of steamboats. Adverse conditions could delay a visit by up to two months. When sufficiently calm, the vessel anchored off-shore. Canoes paddled out to carry mail, freight, and passengers to the beach. Often people and supplies became soaked during the transfer.

A school existed 1913–1936. The population decimated by World War I enlistments, few returned after the war. The cannery, which operated intermittently at nearby Nitinat Narrows 1917–1931, provided the only significant employment opportunities. Throughout the 1920s, servicing the trade conducted by rum-running vessels bound for California, during Prohibition in the United States, offered more questionable rewards. However, increased drunkenness attracted a provincial police presence. During World War II, four of the seven remaining families left.

After the supply ship withdrawal, and lacking road access, only a missionary and a linesman remained, but the Ordway family arrived in 1953. By the late 1960s, only three families resided for a large part of the year. In 1970, the Pacific Rim National Park Reserve absorbed the locality. To evict the remaining residents, Parks Canada required people to live full-time, an impractical burden.

Nowadays, gardens have returned to wilderness. Only a decrepit cabin stands beside the West Coast Trail. English ivy and foxglove grow among the sword ferns and salal. The old telegraph line rusts in the treetops.

== Early tourism proposals ==
In 1913, the West Coast Development Company of Victoria produced a pamphlet to promote a proposed oceanfront resort at Clo-oose. The Canadian Pacific Railway was already developing this symbolic pioneer spirit tourism with its bungalow camps along the main line, which complemented such destination properties as the luxury Banff Springs Hotel. However, Clo-oose, and the hundreds of kilometres of this coastline served by steamboats, lacked any comparable tourist accommodation.

Described as an easy distance to Vancouver, Victoria and Seattle, the qualification "as the crow flies" was omitted. The aim was not only to draw those same wealthy American tourists, but also lure settlers to develop a community infrastructure. These resident investors were urged to promptly purchase their waterfront lots. A large hotel, golf links, tennis courts, croquet and bowling greens, a seaside boardwalk, and large pier were proposed. To capitalize on the popularity of Banff's mineral springs, similar springs at Clo-oose were falsely claimed, as was the absence of mosquitoes. The Cheewat River is tidal, cold, and salty, rendering it unpleasant for both bathing and drinking. Some of the supposedly waterfront properties for sale lacked ocean views, were landlocked, or were below the high-water mark. World War I permanently scuttled the project.

== Shipwrecks ==
1906: Barkentine Skagit wrecked on the reef to the northwest, with the loss of two lives. Earlier that year, the SS Valencia sank 17 kilometres (11 mi) northwest, with the loss of more than 125 lives, prompting the federal government to establish a lifesaving station at Clo-oose in 1907.

1918: Purse seiner Renfrew wrecked on the bar out from the Nitinat Narrows, with the loss of 13 lives.

1923: SS Santa Rita wrecked on a reef to the southeast, with no loss of life.

1925: Schooner Raita wrecked on the rocks just off Whyac Point, with no loss of life.

== Later tourism ==
In 1970, the Pacific Rim National Park Reserve was established, and in 1973, the former lifesaving trail became a hiking trail. At kilometre 35, Clo-oose is almost in the middle. During the 1960s, Helen Dorothy Ordway, and her son, ran a teahouse in the vicinity. Another woman offered her homemade beer to hikers. Both provided shelter to hikers during storms. Ordway was the final postmaster 1961–1966.

The West Coast Development Company accurately predicted the popularity of the region, but for a very different tourist destination to that of a seaside resort. Over recent decades, inconsiderate hikers have wandered into properties still owned, looting and vandalizing. Graves have been desecrated. In the late 1990s the campground at Cheewat was closed, which largely ensures hikers no longer stop and veer from the trail.

== Notable people ==
Marjorie Pickthall (1883–1922), poet and author, resided 1921–1922, and her poem, "Ebb Tide: The Sailor's Grave at Clo-oose, V.I." mentions the community. The poem is regarded as a eulogy to Charles Hansen and Ho Hee, lost on the Renfrew, and buried on a knoll near the First Nations cemetery. The use of the singular may be representative of the era, where newspaper accounts and official reports often excluded Chinese deaths in the tally of disasters. Included in this instance, the 11 Europeans were listed, the two Chinese were not named. Alternatively, the poet may be merging the two into one to represent either their shared deaths, or the many sailors drowned along the coast. In reality, this pair either worked in the cannery or on a fishing boat.
