= SS Caracas =

Coastal passenger steamship built by William Cramp & Sons in Philadelphia (1881–1889)

Coordinates: 44.609°N 124.081°W

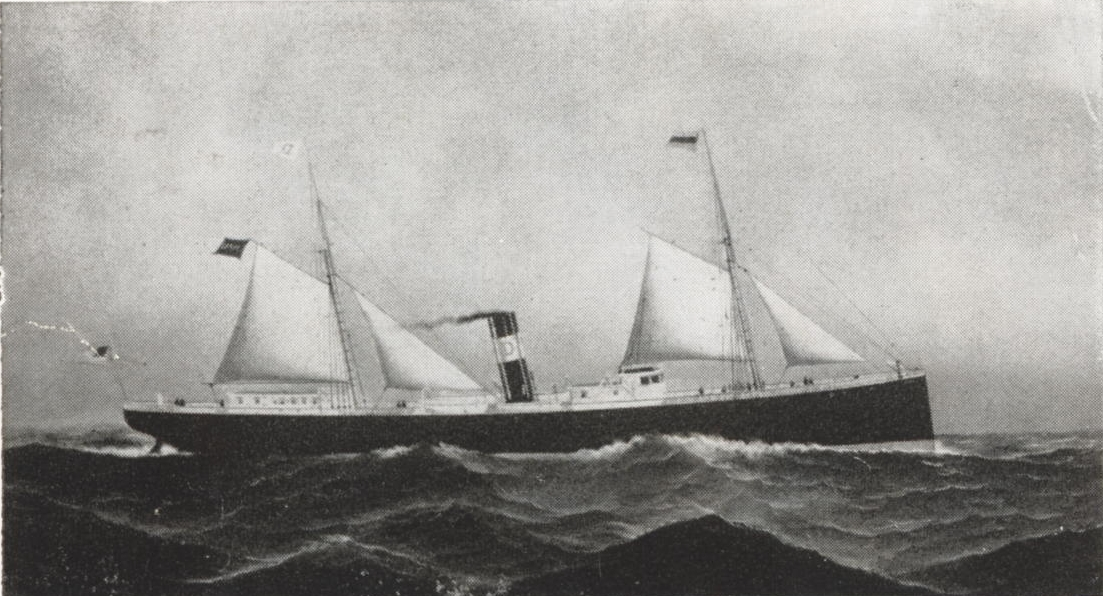
- Caracas in Red D Line service.

History

United States
- Name: Caracas
- Namesake: Caracas, Venezuela
- Owner: Red D Line 1881–1888
- Port of registry: United States
- Route: New York City to Caracas via Laguayra and Puerto Cabello
- Builder: William Cramp & Sons, Philadelphia
- Yard number: 218
- Launched: 1881
- Maiden voyage: July 1881
- In service: 1881
- Out of service: 1888
- Fate: Sold and renamed Yaquina Bay.

United States
- Name: Yaquina Bay
- Owner: Oregon Pacific Railroad Company 1888
- Port of registry: United States
- Route: Yaquina City, Oregon to San Francisco, California via Newport, Oregon (planned)
- Acquired: 1888
- In service: 1888 (Planned)
- Fate: Wrecked
- Notes: Ran aground at Yaquina Bay in 1888 and declared a total loss.

General characteristics
- Type: Ocean liner/Coastal passenger liner
- Tonnage: 1,200 tons
- Length: 257 ft (78 m)
- Beam: 34 ft (10 m)
- Notes: Sister ship to Valencia

SS Caracas (1881–1889) was a coastal passenger steamship built by William Cramp & Sons in Philadelphia. She was the older sister ship to Valencia. Both Caracas and Valencia (which sank in 1906, and seen after then as a ghost ship) served the route between New York City and Venezuela. The short life of Caracas ended in 1889, when she ran aground in Yaquina Bay under the name Yaquina Bay.

== History ==
Red D Line had operated a line of sailing vessels to Venezuela since 1839, which continued for almost 40 years. In mid 1879, it was decided to convert this service to steamships. At first, three German steamships were chartered to begin these operations. however, it was recognized that a more permanent purpose-built fleet was needed. As a result, the Red D Line ordered a pair of steamships from William Cramp & Sons in Philadelphia.

The first of the pair, Caracas, was launched in 1881. She displaced around 1,589 tons and began her maiden voyage in June of 1881. The next year, her sister ship, Valencia, joined Caracas on a route from New York City to the Venezuelan cities of Laguayra, Puerto Cabello and Caracas. This journey took 26 days to complete and each ship ran it once per month carrying a combination of passengers, cargo and mail and were manned by American crews. Although identical to Caracas, Valencia was 5 ft (2 m) shorter in overall length. From Caracas, the wooden steamer Maracaibo offered an extension service to the port of her namesake. Unlike Valencia and Caracas which flew the American flag, Maracaibo flew the British flag.

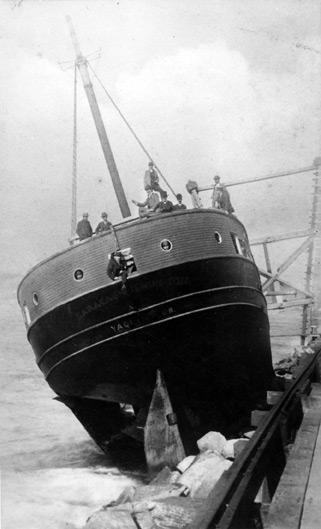
Wreck of Yaquina Bay at the south jetty near the entrance to Yaquina Bay.

In 1888, having only served 7 years with the Red D Line, Caracas was sold for $175,000 to T. Egenton Hogg of the Oregon Pacific Railroad Company. She was renamed Yaquina Bay. She was intended to serve between Yaquina City, Newport and San Francisco, California, where Yaquina Bay was to replace the earlier Yaquina City, which had run aground a year earlier. The Oregon Pacific Railroad also operated a railroad line between Yaquina City through Corvallis. By having a combination of steamship and rail service through Yaquina City and Corvallis rather than the usual route through Portland, over 300 miles (480 km) could be cut from the journey between California and Chicago. With Yaquina Bay restarting the company's steamship service, travel time from California to Chicago could once again be shortened. Unfortunately, Yaquina Bay was to never see this ambitious service. While being delivered on December 9, 1888, Yaquina Bay broke free from the steamer which was towing her and ran aground at the bay of her namesake near the remains of Yaquina City and was declared a total loss. Having lost a considerable amount of money from the wreck, Hogg stopped his ambitious project and left Oregon a broken man. Local residents believed that the Portland-based companies purposely sabotaged both of Hogg's vessels, so as to prevent him from taking away potential customers from their business.

Caracas' sister ship, Valencia, went on to serve with the Red D Line until 1898. In 1897, she survived a pre-meditated attack from the Spanish cruiser Reina Mercedes. She became a coastal liner on the west coast of the United States, serving from San Francisco, California to Alaska via Seattle, Washington. For a short period of time, Valencia served as a troopship for the United States Army during the Spanish–American War. In January 1906, Valencia suffered a similar fate to the Caracas when she ran aground off Vancouver Island. She was ripped apart and sunk by the pounding surf, killing 116 people.
