= SS City of Topeka =

American cargo passenger steamship

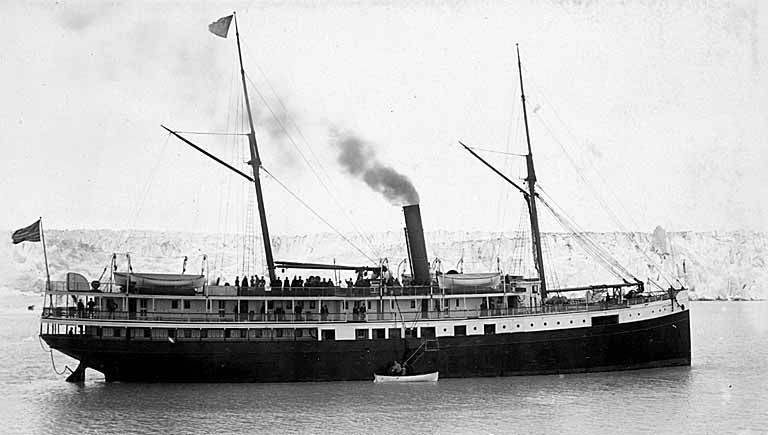
Steamer City of Topeka beside Muir Glacier, ca 1899 (WARNER 500)

SS City of Topeka was an iron-hulled passenger/cargo steamship built in 1884 by John Roach & Sons in Chester, Pennsylvania for the Atchison, Topeka & Santa Fe Railroad. She was purchased by the Pacific Coast Steamship Company in 1887 and used to transport cargo and passengers from Seattle, WA to Alaska, a route which was expanded to accommodate the Klondike Gold Rush. On September 11, 1906, she began to take on water while docked in Seattle and sank. She was raised, pumped, refloated, and after a brief interruption she resumed service. In 1916, the Pacific-Alaska Navigation Company merged with the Pacific Coast Steamship Company to form the Pacific Steamship Company, which sold the steamer in 1920 to the Inter-Island Steam Navigation Company. In 1921 she was purchased by the Los Angeles Steamship Company who extensively renovated her at the Hanlon Dry Dock and Shipbuilding facility and renamed her the SS Waimea. As Waimea she ran a weekly route between San Pedro and San Francisco, and saw her routes expanded to include Los Angeles. She was laid up in the Port of Los Angeles in 1930 and sold in 1932. She was broken down in 1933 and her iron plates were sold for scrap.
