= Pacific Coast Steamship Company =

American shipping company

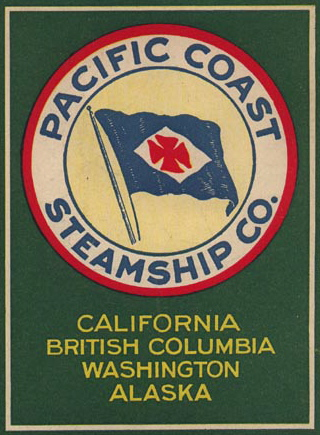
- Founded: October 17, 1876
- Defunct: 1916
- Fate: Bought by the Admiral Line
- Headquarters: San Francisco, California

The Pacific Coast Steamship Company was an important early shipping company that operated steamships on the west coast of North America. It was first organized in 1867 under the name Goodall, Nelson and Perkins. The Goodall, Nelson & Perkins Steamship Company was formed in 1875, but a year later was reorganized as the Pacific Coast Steamship Company. In 1916 the Admiral Line bought the shipping interests of the company.

== History ==
=== Organization and operations ===
House flag of the Pacific Coast Steamship Company.

The company was first organized in 1867 under the name of Goodall, Nelson and Perkins, Agents. The company's chief rival was the Pacific Mail Steamship Company.

The competition was settled in January 1875, with Goodall, Nelson and Perkins buying six side-wheel steamships from Pacific Mail, as well as certain wharves. Goodall Nelson and Perkins would form a new company to handle the traffic between San Diego and San Francisco, while Pacific Mail would (at least initially) control the routes from Central America and those north of San Francisco.

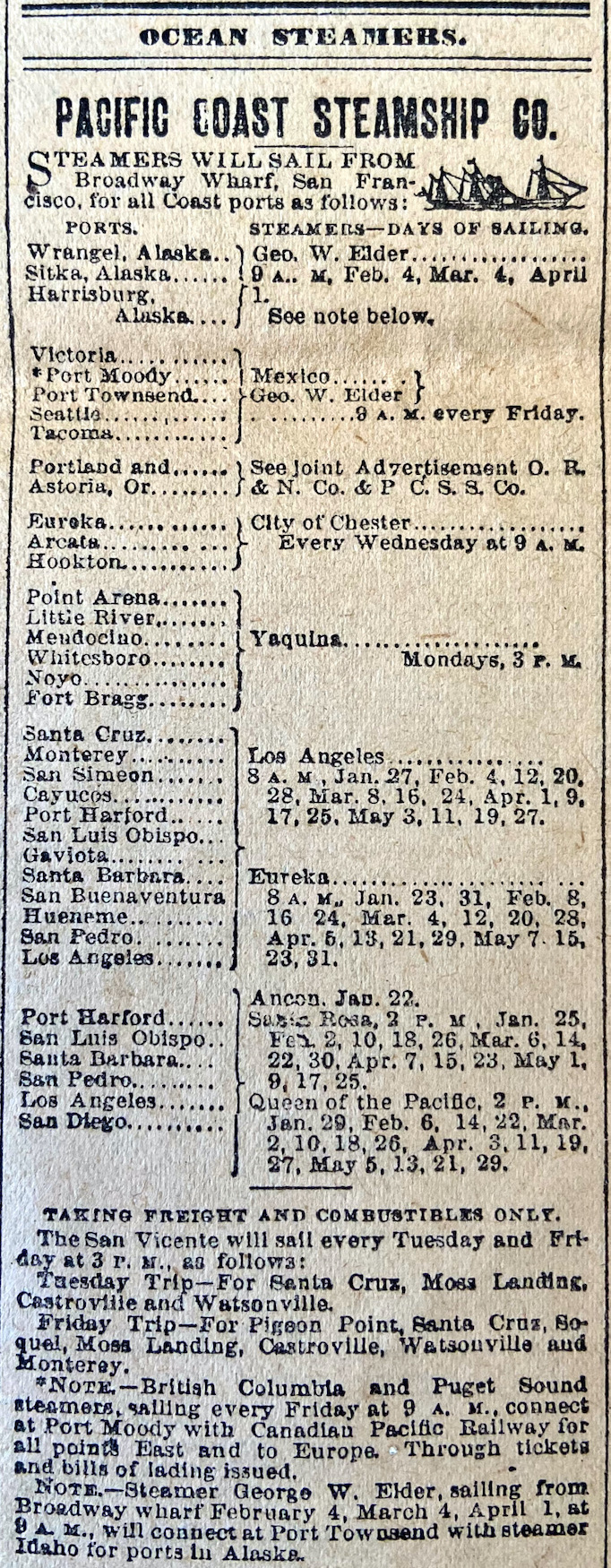
Schedule for early 1887

The new company, Goodall, Nelson & Perkins Steamship Company was formed in February 1875. On November 4 of that same year, their paddle steamer SS Pacific was lost in a collision off Cape Flattery, Washington with the deaths of over 200 people. Less than a year later Christopher Nelson retired and the remaining partners reorganized, on October 17, 1876, as the Pacific Coast Steamship Company (P.C.S.S.C.), providing service to twenty ports in California.

For about a year, the reorganized company attempted to compete with Pacific Mail on the northern run to Victoria, British Columbia, but rate wars meant losses for both companies, and P.C.S.S.C. gave up the fight. A similar competition with the California, Oregon & Mexican Steamship Company in 1877 for the San Francisco-Portland route led to a joint agreement and a pooling of ships for several years. In 1879, P.C.S.S.C. again challenged Pacific Mail (with a ship that the latter had once owned, the Dakota) on the San-Francisco-Victoria run. This time they won, and in 1880, Pacific Mail decided to focus on Central America and (later) trans-Pacific routes.

Beginning in 1881, they also took on the Seattle-Alaska route. This led to Henry Villard's Oregon Improvement Company purchasing a controlling interest in P.C.S.S.C. (as well as in Goodall and Perkins's San Luis Obispo and Santa Maria Valley Railroad), retaining Goodall, Perkins & Co. as general agents. This tied the steamship line in with the Oregon Improvement Company's Columbia and Puget Sound Railroad. Oregon Improvement Company's financial collapse in the Panic of 1893 led to receivership and ultimately, in 1897, reorganization as the new Pacific Coast Company, headed by J.D. Farrell. The new company prospered greatly in the Klondike Gold Rush.

During the Spanish–American War the U.S. Army Quartermaster Department chartered two vessels from the company to transport troops to and from the Philippines. SS Senator was chartered June 8, 1898 for $1000 per day. Senator displaced 2409 tons and carried 1000 troops. SS City of Puebla was chartered June 23, 1898, at a rate of $900 per day. City of Puebla displaced 2623 tons, made 12 knots and carried 635 troops.

Goodall, Perkins pulled out in 1902, and the company's center of gravity shifted decisively to Seattle. P.C.S.S.C. operations in Puget Sound, running two steamers on the hazardous route from Seattle to Bellingham, Washington.

Its steamships regularly sailed from Seattle to SE Alaska before and after the Klondike Gold Rush. The City of Topeka did a 22-day round trip between Seattle and Skagway, stopping in Port Townsend, Victoria, Mary Island, Wrangell, and Juneau.

In 1906, Pacific Coast's SS Valencia was lost after running aground on the rocky shore of Vancouver Island. Over 100 people, including all women and children on board, lost their lives.

Beginning in 1907, the company largely stopped doing short-distance travel and focused on longer runs, with the fast steamers Governor and President (joined in 1914 by Congress) doing a Seattle-Victoria-San Francisco-Los Angeles-San Diego run. They weren't necessarily the fastest ships on some of these runs, but they were close, and a lot steadier and more comfortable than their slightly speedier competitors.

== Ships ==
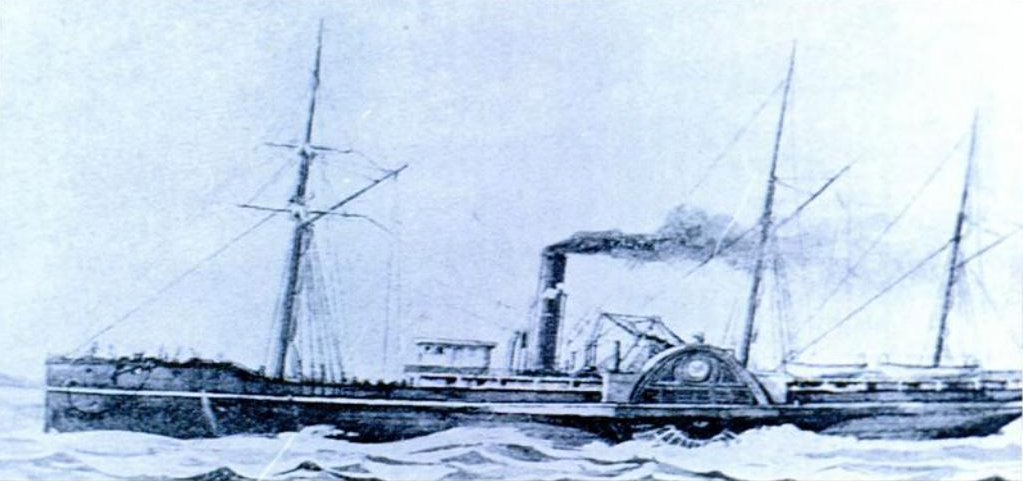
The ill-fated SS Pacific

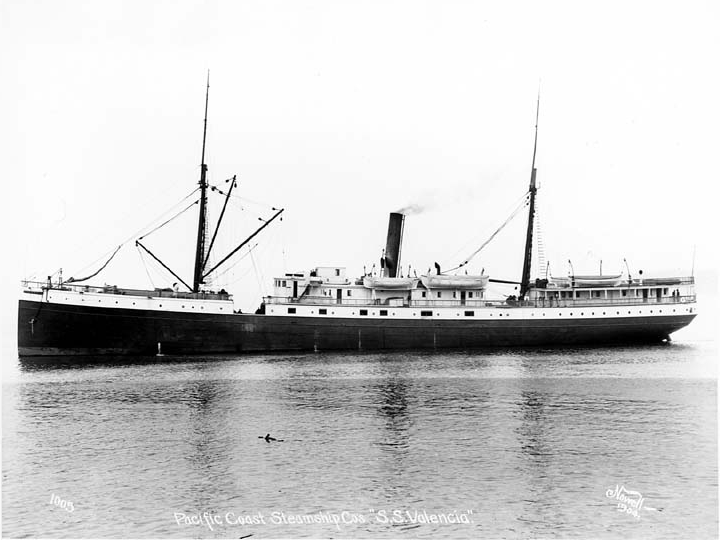
SS George W. Elder

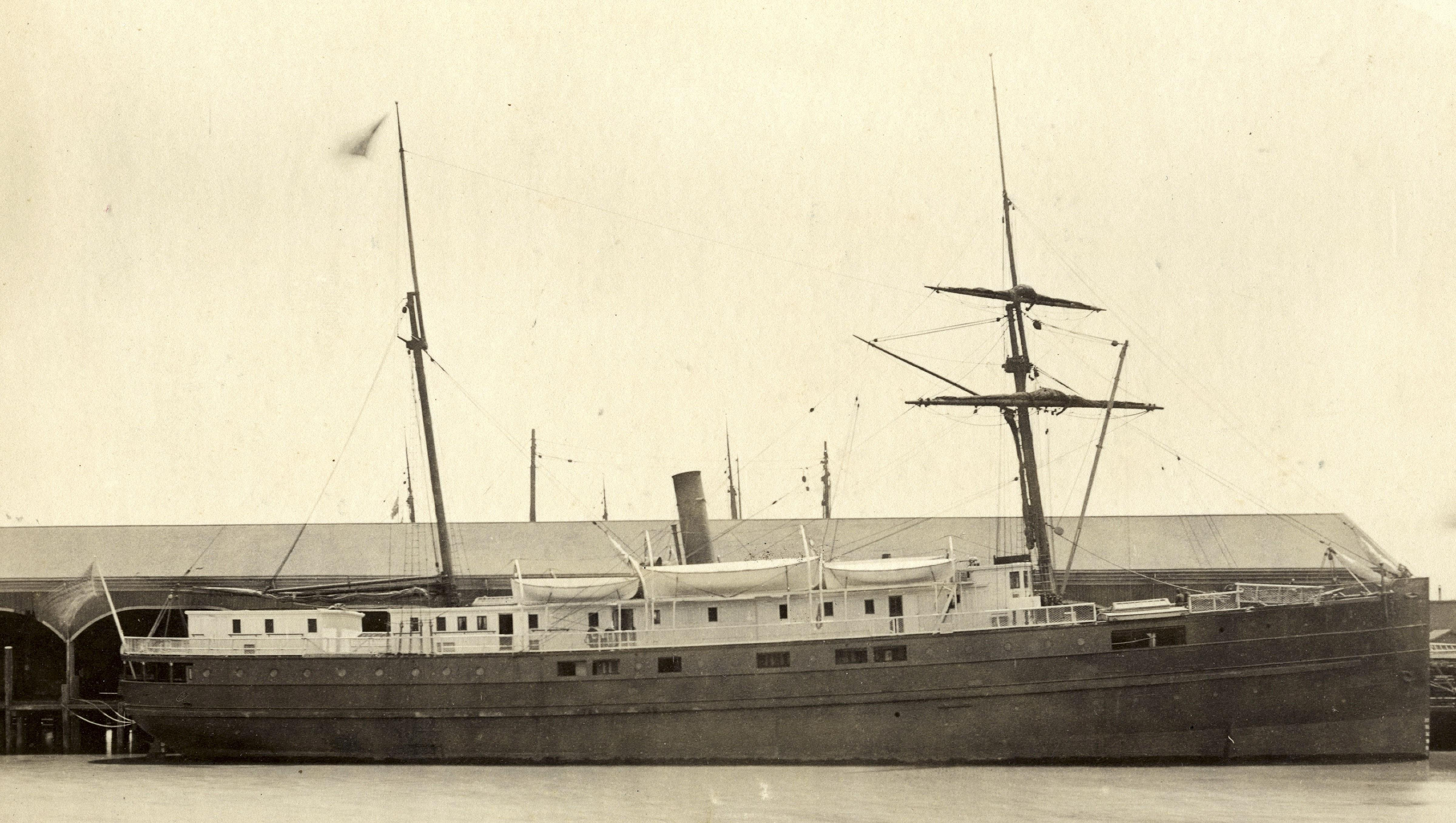
SS City of Chester

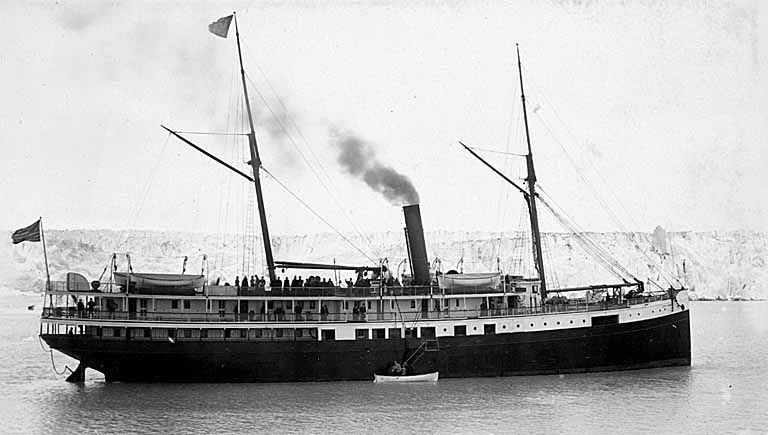
The City of Topeka in 1899 alongside the Muir Glacier

== Railway lines ==
Beginning around 1873, a horse-powered, 2 ft 6 in (762 mm) narrow gauge tramway transported passengers and freight between Port Harford and a wagon road at Avila Beach. In 1876, the steamship company replaced the tram with the 3 ft (914 mm) gauge steam-powered San Luis Obispo & Santa Maria Valley Railroad to San Luis Obispo. This railway became the first segment of the Pacific Coast Railway in 1882.

== Termination ==
The company effectively ceased business in 1916 when its vessels were purchased by the Admiral Line. The Admiral Line however also adopted the name "The Pacific Steamship Company", which it used until 1936 when operations ceased, victims of the Great Depression in general and especially of the 1934 West Coast waterfront strike. Separately from that, the "Pacific Coast Steamship Company" name lived on until 1938 for two freighters, used in the Alaska gypsum trade: the Diamond Cement and the Eastern Guide.
