= Pachena Point Light =

Lighthouse in British Columbia, Canada

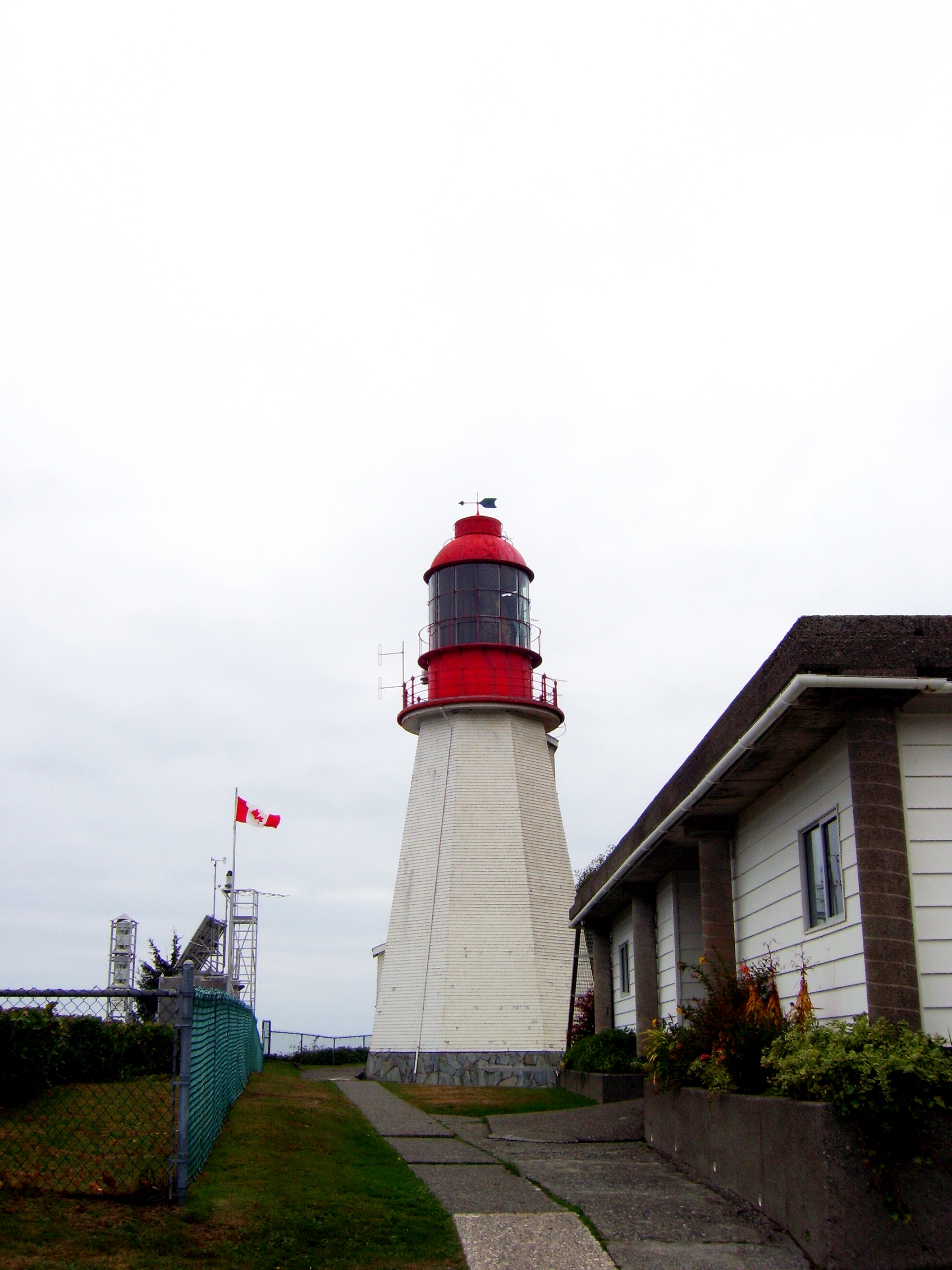
- Location: Pachena Point; Vancouver Island; British Columbia; Canada
- Coordinates: 48°43′19.6″N 125°05′51.2″W

Tower
- Construction: Wooden tower
- Height: 66 feet (20 m)
- Shape: Octagonal tower with balcony and lantern
- Markings: White tower, red lantern
- Operator: Canadian Coast Guard
- Heritage: recognized federal heritage building of Canada, heritage lighthouse

Light
- First lit: 1908
- Focal height: 154 feet (47 m)
- Lens: First order Fresnel lens
- Range: 14 nautical miles (26 km; 16 mi)
- Characteristic: Fl (2) W 7.5 seconds

Pachena Point Lighthouse is located on Vancouver Island, 13 kilometres (8.1 mi) south of Bamfield, British Columbia, in Pacific Rim National Park. The octagonal wooden tower is maintained by the Canadian Coast Guard who employ lighthouse keepers at the station. In Summer of 2024, it was announced that Pachena Point Light (along with nearby Carmanah Point Light) would be destaffed before the end of the year. On October 26 of the same year, the lightkeepers departed the station, leaving it unstaffed. This change was not well received and was met with heavy criticism.

== Keepers ==
- John S. Richardson 1907–1908
- William Robinson Pillar 1908–1913
- Richard Clark 1913–1919
- G. Allan Couldrey 1919–1923
- Art Gorden 1923–1924
- James W. Davis 1925–1930
- Guy Clear 1930–1931
- John Alfred Hunting 1924, 1931–1958
- Gerald Wellard 1957–1959
- William Milne 1969
- F. Bergthorson 1969–1973
- Robert W. Noble 1973–1976
- Tom E. Carr 1977–1983
- Edward J. Ashe 1983–1985
- Ian Crocker 1985–1991, 1996–1998
- Iain Colquohuon 1988–1991
- Peter Redhead 1991–1992, 1998–2004
- Calvin Martin 2005–2021
- Lance McNichol 2022–2024

== See also ==
- List of lighthouses in British Columbia
- List of lighthouses in Canada
