= Bamfield =

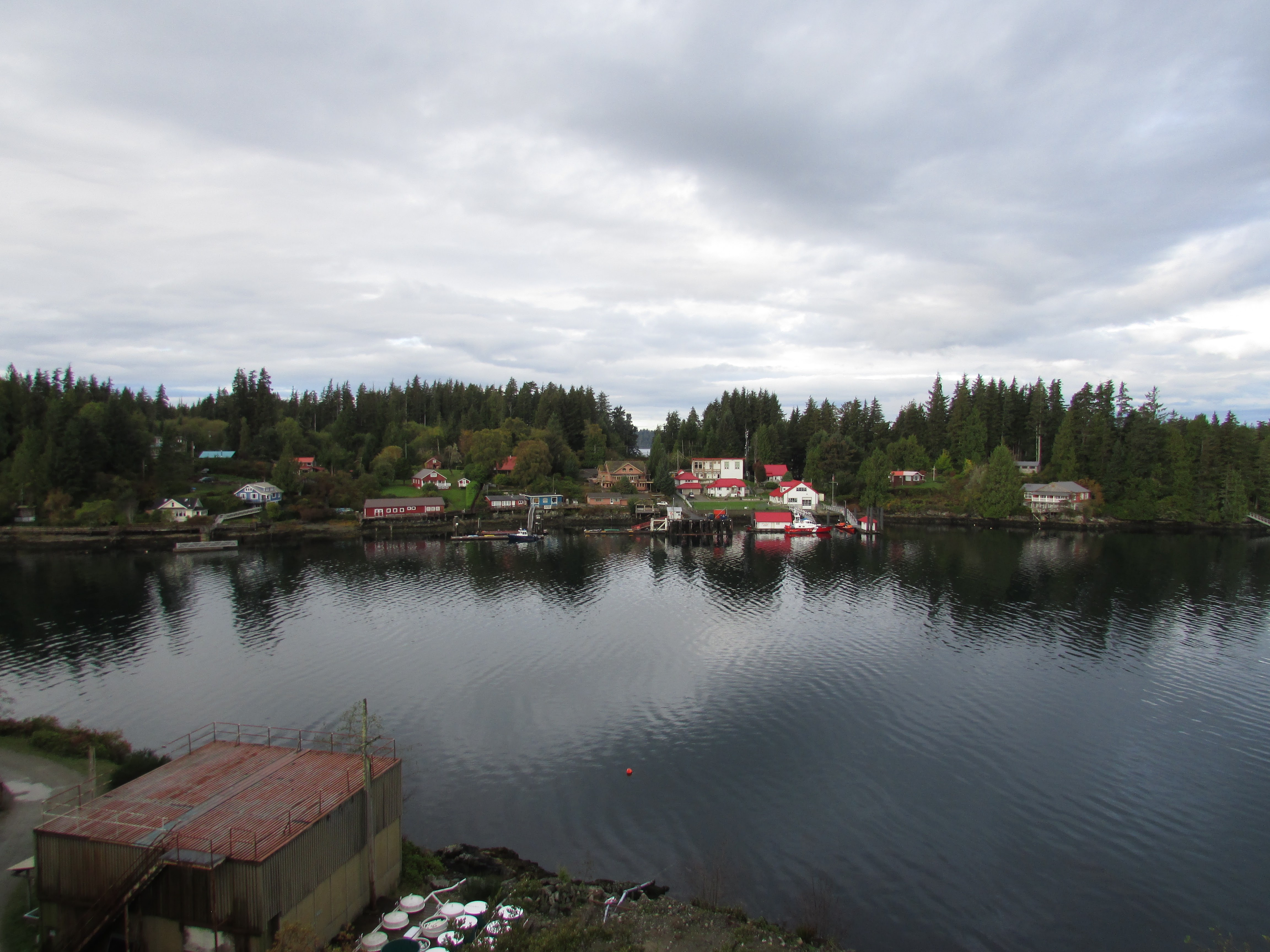
- Bamfield, including the Coast Guard Station, as seen from Bamfield Marine Sciences Centre.

- Location of Bamfield in British Columbia Bamfield (British Columbia)
- Coordinates: 48°49′49″N 125°8′15″W
- Country: Canada
- Province: British Columbia

Population (2016)
  - Total: 179
- Time zone: UTC−07:00 (Pacific Time)

Bamfield is a community that is surrounded by Crown Land, First Nation Lands belonging to the Huu-ay-aht Nations, and portions of the Pacific Rim National Park, located on Barkley Sound, Vancouver Island in British Columbia, Canada. The community, with a population of 179 as of 2016, is divided by Bamfield Inlet.

== History ==
Bamfield was populated by Huu-ay-aht of the Nuu-chah-nulth, the local Indigenous people. Europeans founded a small fishing community sometime in the late 1800s. Most of the Indigenous people now live in the neighbouring village of Anacla about 5 kilometres from Bamfield.

Bamfield was named after the first government agent of the area, William Eddy Banfield. The name "Bamfield" with an "m" is said to have occurred either because of how the Huu-ay-aht had pronounced the agent's name, or it was a mistake made by the postal organization. In 1902, the Bamfield cable station was constructed as the western terminus of a worldwide undersea telegraph cable called the All Red Line by some, as it passed only through countries and territories controlled by the British Empire, which were coloured red on maps of the time. The cable initially went to Fanning Island, a tiny coral atoll in the mid-Pacific, and from there continued to Fiji, New Zealand, and Australia. On May 16, 1915, American newspapers reported that an enemy Demo team had tried to land at Bamfield but was scared off by the military guards.

A second building, made of concrete, was built on the site in 1926 to replace the old wood structure. This building, designated a historic site in 1930, is now used by the Bamfield Marine Sciences Centre. During the early years of World War II, Cable & Wireless' cable station was shelled by an Imperial Japanese Navy submarine from nearby Barkley Sound without any major damage being inflicted, however the Canadian Government arranged for a company of troops to be based there until the end of that conflict.

A Marine and Fisheries lifesaving station on the Pacific coast was established at Bamfield in 1907. It was the first lifesaving station on Canada's Pacific Coast.

In 1953 the cable was extended up the Alberni Inlet to Port Alberni and the local station was closed on June 20, 1959. Following the closure, only the large concrete building, two cable storage tanks and an adjacent building survived, as all the rest were demolished.

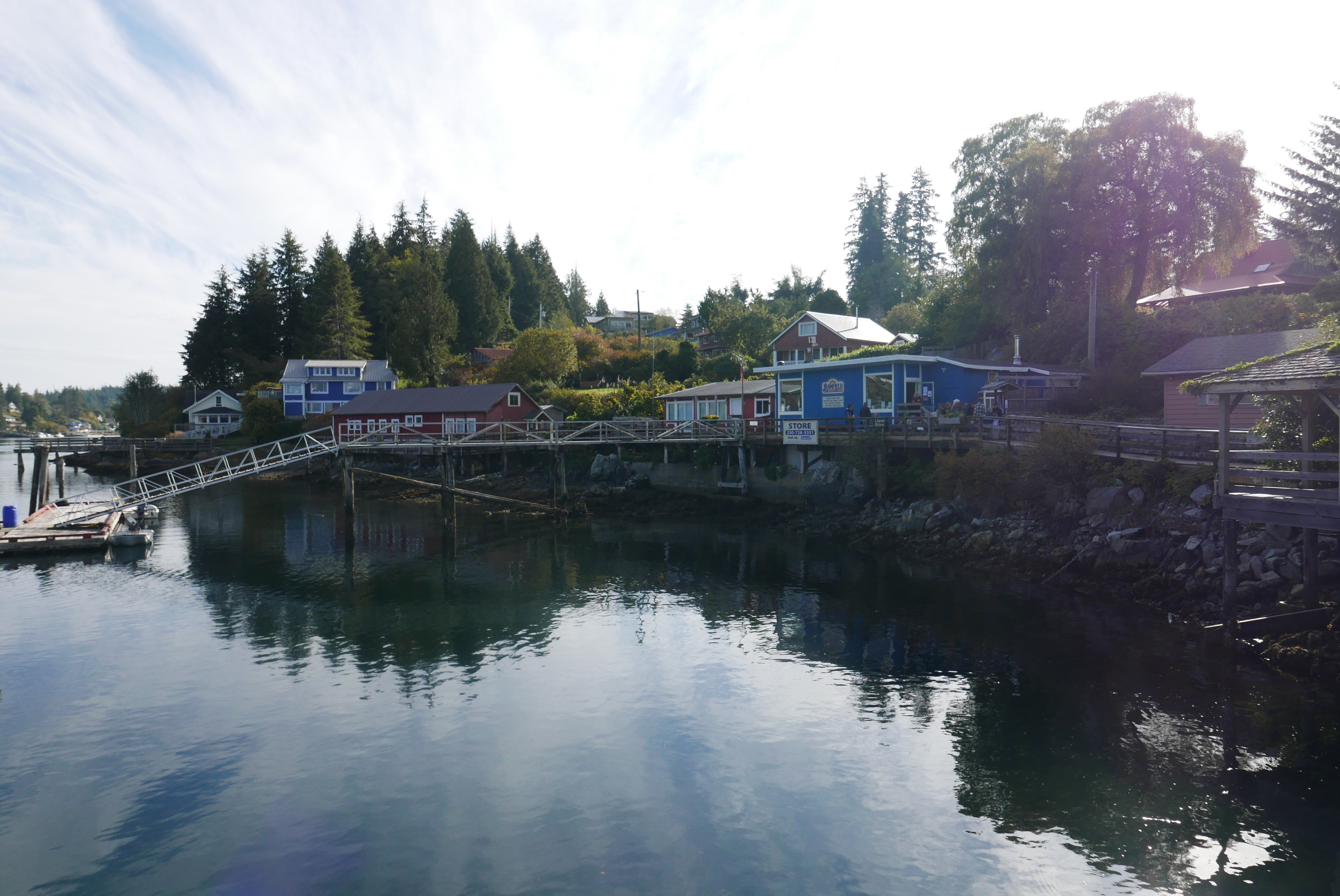
Part of Bamfield's boardwalk.

In 1968, the National Research Council asked five western Canadian universities (University of British Columbia, University of Victoria, University of Calgary, University of Alberta and Simon Fraser University) to propose the best location for a marine biology station on the Pacific Coast. Although Victoria was the earlier winner, a feasibility study tendered in 1969 recommended Bamfield as the better location. The former cable station property was purchased in 1969 and a formal structure for the management and development of the station was created in 1970 when the five universities ratified a Constitution and joined the Western Canadian Universities Marine Biological Society. In 1971, development began to convert the site into a research station. With most of the physical facilities completed, the Bamfield Marine Sciences Centre began operations by the end of 1972. It became the largest employer in the community since. Commercial fishing was based in Bamfield up to the mid-1980s. Bamfield is now home to several sport fishing lodges, which pursue primarily salmon and halibut. Bamfield is also the northern terminus of the West Coast Trail, a hiking trail built in 1907 along the west coast of Vancouver Island to help survivors of the area's many shipwrecks find their way back to civilization. The trail runs 77 kilometres (48 mi) along extremely rugged terrain.

Today Bamfield is primarily a tourist destination, either for the West Coast Trail, ocean kayaking or sport fishing. The research activities at the Bamfield Marine Sciences Centre attracts hundreds of researchers every year. The Bamfield Marine Sciences Centre also offers credited university courses through its five associated universities. An outreach program, which provides multi-day immersion field trips for school, college and adult learners, also bring thousands of visitors to the community every year.

The town is featured in the first episode of CBC Television's 2015 comedy/reality series Still Standing.

== Climate ==
Bamfield experiences an oceanic climate.

Climate data for Bamfield
Month	Jan	Feb	Mar	Apr	May	Jun	Jul	Aug	Sep	Oct	Nov	Dec	Year
Record high °C (°F)	18.0 (64.4)	19.4 (66.9)	21.7 (71.1)	25.0 (77.0)	31.5 (88.7)	32.8 (91.0)	31.7 (89.1)	32.0 (89.6)	31.0 (87.8)	27.5 (81.5)	20.0 (68.0)	16.5 (61.7)	32.8 (91.0)
Mean daily maximum °C (°F)	7.8 (46.0)	9.0 (48.2)	10.3 (50.5)	12.0 (53.6)	14.3 (57.7)	16.0 (60.8)	18.1 (64.6)	18.8 (65.8)	18.1 (64.6)	14.1 (57.4)	10.0 (50.0)	7.7 (45.9)	13.0 (55.4)
Daily mean °C (°F)	4.8 (40.6)	5.6 (42.1)	6.5 (43.7)	8.1 (46.6)	10.6 (51.1)	12.6 (54.7)	14.4 (57.9)	14.8 (58.6)	13.6 (56.5)	10.2 (50.4)	6.8 (44.2)	4.8 (40.6)	9.4 (48.9)
Mean daily minimum °C (°F)	1.7 (35.1)	2.1 (35.8)	2.6 (36.7)	4.1 (39.4)	6.8 (44.2)	9.1 (48.4)	10.6 (51.1)	10.8 (51.4)	9.1 (48.4)	6.3 (43.3)	3.5 (38.3)	1.8 (35.2)	5.7 (42.3)
Record low °C (°F)	−9.4 (15.1)	−9.5 (14.9)	−4.0 (24.8)	−2.2 (28.0)	−0.6 (30.9)	2.2 (36.0)	4.4 (39.9)	4.0 (39.2)	0.0 (32.0)	−3.5 (25.7)	−9.0 (15.8)	−10.6 (12.9)	−10.6 (12.9)
Average precipitation mm (inches)	387.7 (15.26)	344.0 (13.54)	321.7 (12.67)	205.1 (8.07)	144.8 (5.70)	105.5 (4.15)	61.2 (2.41)	75.1 (2.96)	102.9 (4.05)	290.6 (11.44)	443.4 (17.46)	407.3 (16.04)	2,889.2 (113.75)
Average rainfall mm (inches)	381.6 (15.02)	339.5 (13.37)	320.0 (12.60)	205.0 (8.07)	144.8 (5.70)	105.5 (4.15)	61.2 (2.41)	75.1 (2.96)	102.9 (4.05)	290.6 (11.44)	441.2 (17.37)	402.1 (15.83)	2,869.4 (112.97)
Average snowfall cm (inches)	6.1 (2.4)	4.5 (1.8)	1.8 (0.7)	0 (0)	0 (0)	0 (0)	0 (0)	0 (0)	0 (0)	0.1 (0.0)	2.3 (0.9)	5.1 (2.0)	19.9 (7.8)
Average precipitation days (≥ 0.2 mm)	21.0	19.2	20.5	18.1	14.2	11.9	8.0	7.8	10.3	17.5	22.3	21.7	192.5
Average rainy days (≥ 0.2 mm)	20.4	18.9	20.4	18.1	14.2	11.9	8.0	7.8	10.3	17.5	22.1	21.0	190.7
Average snowy days (≥ 0.2 cm)	1.5	1.2	0.78	0.04	0	0	0	0	0	0.04	0.50	1.7	5.7
Source: Environment Canada

== Gallery ==
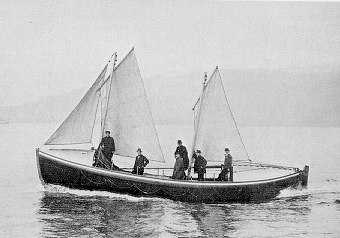
The motor lifeboat stationed at Bamfield in 1907

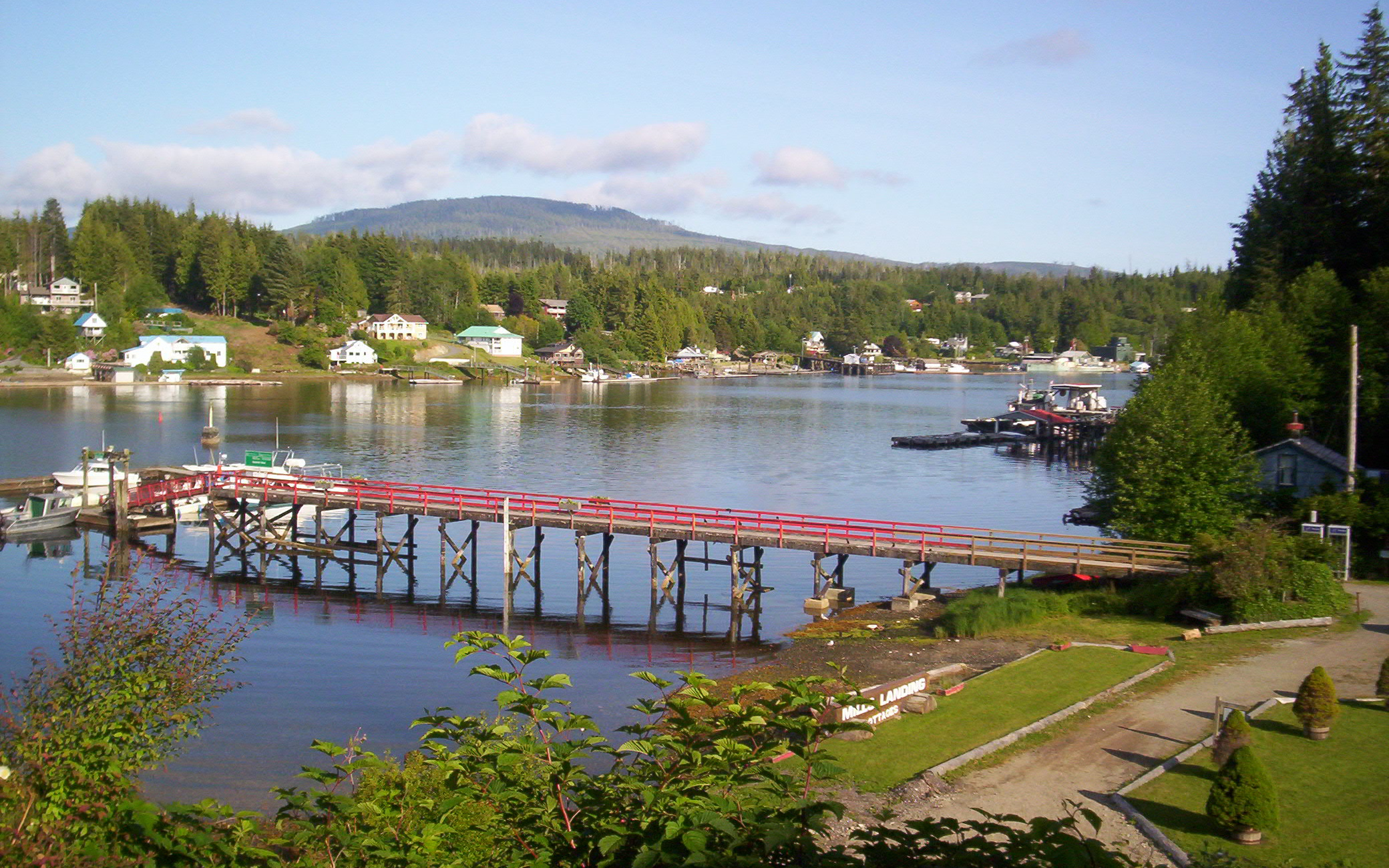
Bamfield dock

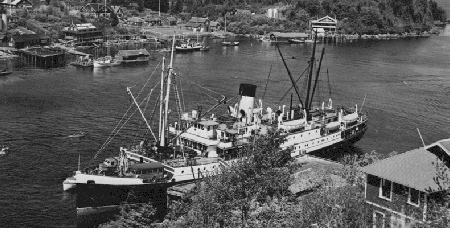
SS Princess Norah at Bamfield, 1929

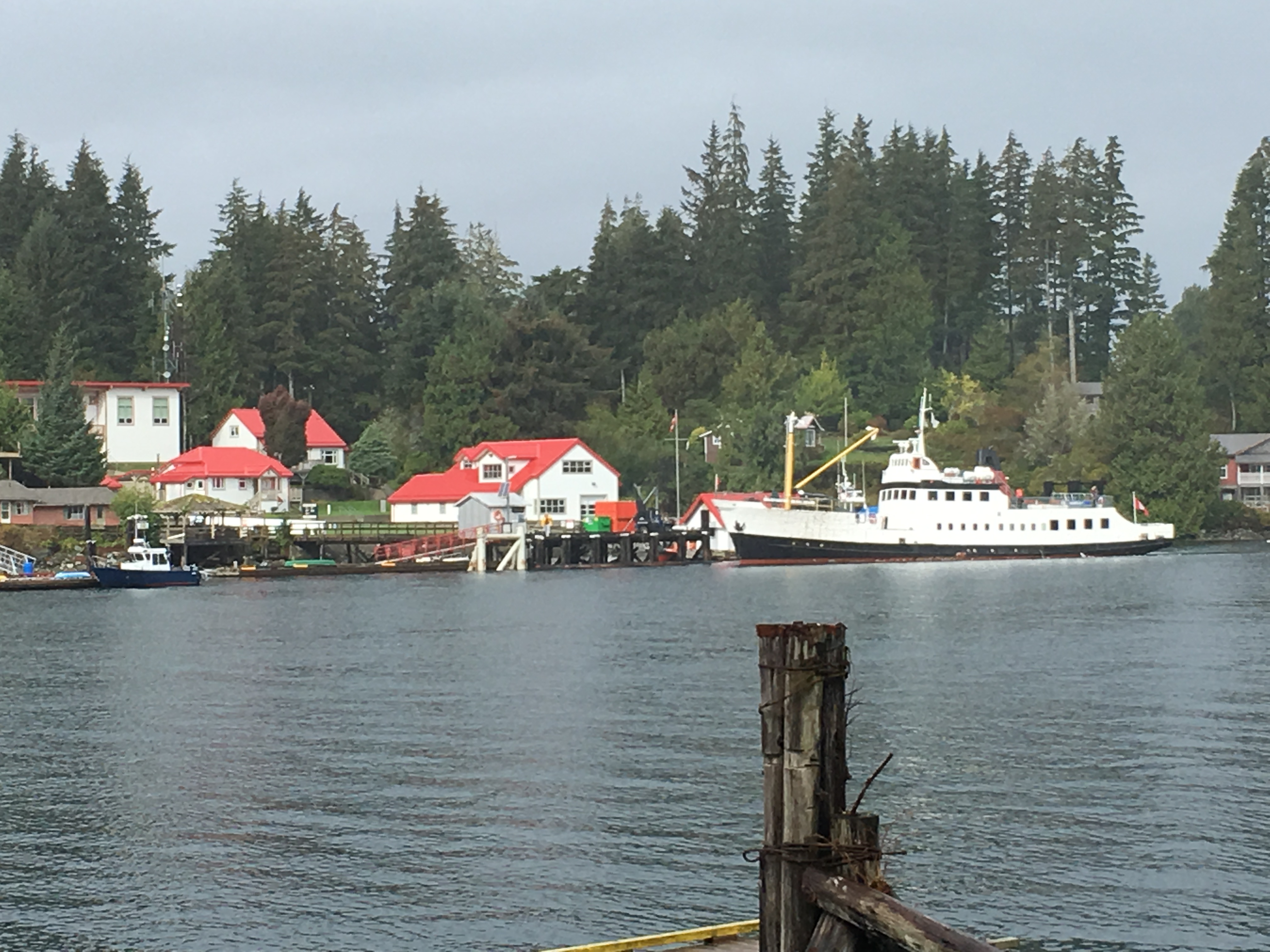
MV Frances Barkley stopping in Bamfield, 2016
