= Port Alberni =

- City
- City of Port Alberni
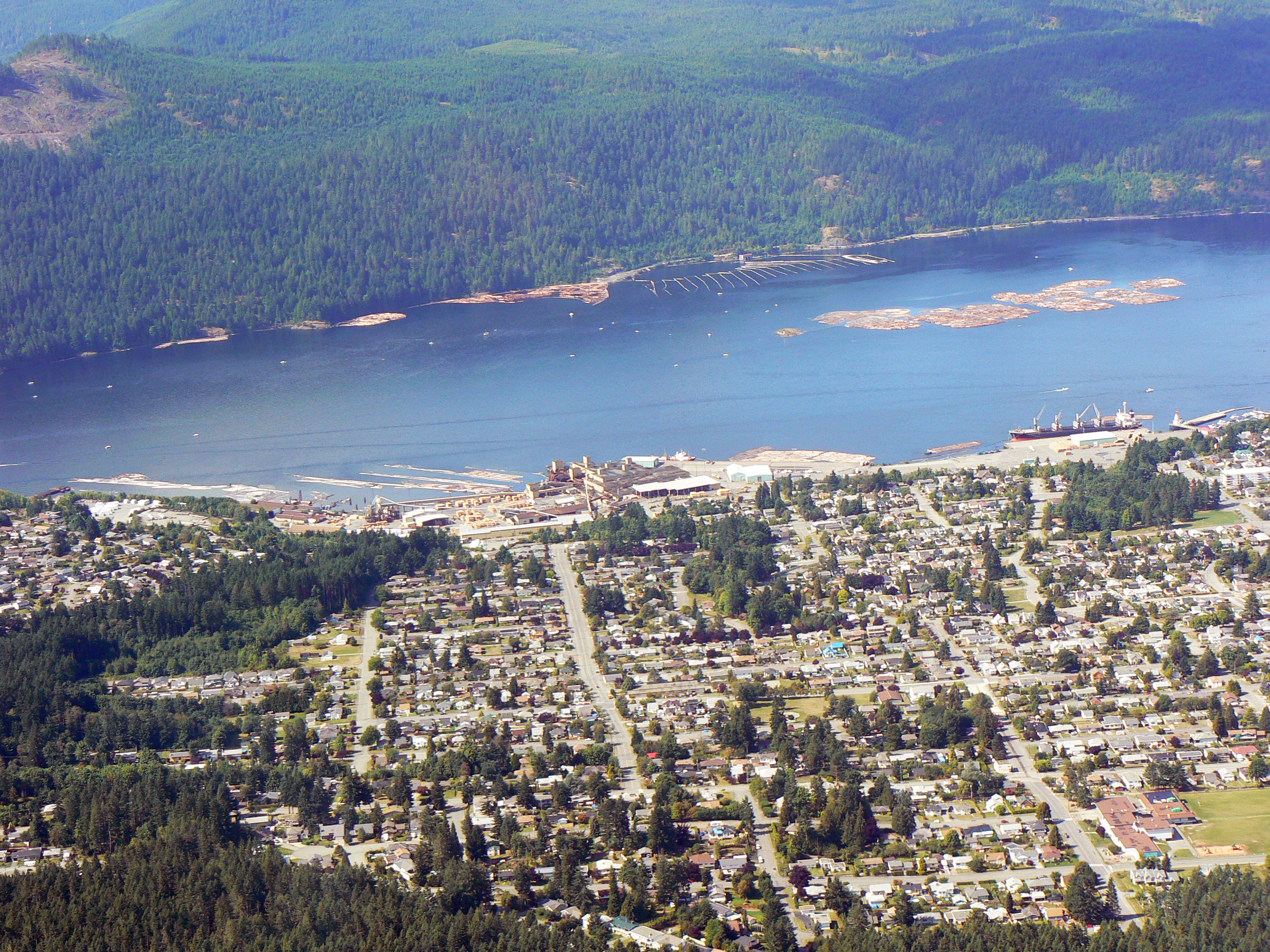
- Aerial view of Port Alberni
- Motto: Gateway to the Pacific West Coast
- Location of Port Alberni in British Columbia Port Alberni (British Columbia)
- Coordinates: 49°14′2″N 124°48′18″W
- Country: Canada
- Province: British Columbia
- Regional district: Alberni-Clayoquot
- Incorporated: 1912

Government
  - Mayor: Charles Mealey
  - Governing body: Port Alberni City Council

Area
  - Total: 19.66 km^{2} (7.59 sq mi)

Population (2021)
  - Total: 18,259
  - Density: 928.9/km^{2} (2,406/sq mi)
- Time zone: UTC−07:00 (PT)
- Forward sortation area: V9Y
- Area codes: 250, 778, 236, 672
- Highways: Highway 4
- Waterways: Sproat Lake, Alberni Inlet
- Climate: Csb
- Website: portalberni.ca

Port Alberni (/ælˈbɜːrni/) is a city located on Vancouver Island in the province of British Columbia, Canada. The city lies within the Alberni Valley at the head of the Alberni Inlet, Vancouver Island's longest inlet. Port Alberni currently has a total population of 18,259.

It is the location of the head offices of the Alberni-Clayoquot Regional District. Port Alberni is served by the coast-spanning Island Highway system, and a local airport. The principal industry is forestry products.

== History ==
Port Alberni and the West Coast of Vancouver Island have been populated by the people of Tseshaht First Nation, Hupacasath First Nation, and the Nuu-chah-nulth people for thousands of years. Many place names in Port Alberni have a Nuu-chah-nulth origin, such as Somass (washing), Kitsuksis (log across mouth of creek), Pacheena (foamy), and Nootka (go around). Ancient petroglyph carvings can be found at Sproat Lake.

The City of Port Alberni is named for Captain Don Pedro de Alberní, a Spanish officer, who commanded Fort San Miguel at Nootka Sound on Vancouver Island's west coast from 1790 to 1792. Sproat Lake was named after Gilbert Sproat and Stamp Falls and Stamp River were named after Edward Stamp. Rogers Creek, which flows through the centre of Port Alberni, is named after Jeremiah Rogers who was the head logger for the British company Anderson, Anderson & Co.

Illustration from Indian Legends of Vancouver Island by Alfred Carmichael

In March 1787, Captain Charles William Barkley of the Imperial Eagle, explored Barkley Sound, which now bears his name. Barkley travelled with his 17-year-old bride, Frances Barkley, the first European woman to visit what is now British Columbia. Frances Barkley is also the name of one of the two vessels that makes trips down the Alberni Inlet from Port Alberni to Bamfield and Ucluelet. The other, since retired, was the MV Lady Rose.

In 1849, the British established the Colony of Vancouver Island under Governor James Douglas. The island had been claimed by both Spain and Great Britain, but a treaty was made between them designating the island as British territory. The island colony was later merged with the Colony of British Columbia, which joined Canada in 1871.

In 1856, Adam Horne, a Scottish fur trader employed by the Hudson's Bay Company, was directed to locate a land route across Vancouver Island. There were stories that the Indigenous people used a trail starting at Qualicum. Adam Horne found this trail leading to the Alberni Valley and it became known as the Horne Lake Trail. Many other settlers used this trail to get to the Alberni Valley.

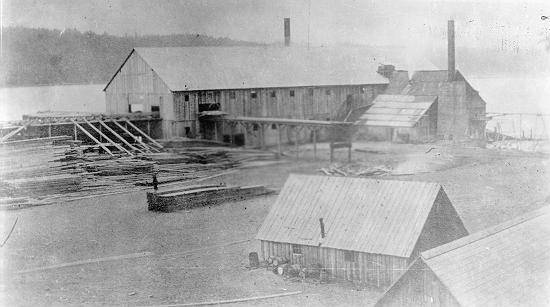
Anderson Sawmill Port Alberni, B.C. 1863

In 1860, the Anderson company, a shipping company from London, England, took the advice of their Victoria agent Captain Edward Stamp and set up a sawmill operation. At the time, the American Civil War prevented the importation of timber from the southern United States. Gilbert Sproat and Edward Stamp transported men and machinery to Alberni. They received land grants from Governor James Douglas and started running the Anderson sawmill at the mouth of the Somass River on 22 May 1861, at the rate of 14,000 board feet a day. The first mill in B.C. was built to export lumber. The original mill failed, but several others were established in the 1880s. The settlement of Alberni developed around the sawmill.

In 1862, small-scale placer gold mining took place on China Creek; in the 1890s more gold mining took place along the Alberni Inlet at China Creek and Mineral Creek. Several gold veins were found. Exploration for gold continued over the years with peaks in the 1930s and 1960s.

The subdistrict of Alberni had a population of 191 in 1891. In 1896, a new settlement was established to the south of Alberni, first known as New Alberni and later as Port Alberni. It was built around a new Canadian Pacific Navigation Company wharf at the foot of today's Argyle Street. In 1921, there were 998 people in Alberni.

From 1900 until 1973, the Alberni Indian Residential School operated just north of Port Alberni on the west bank of the Somass River. The Alberni School is now considered to be part of a genocidal operation against the Indigenous people. The School, run by the Presbyterian and United Churches and the federal government, forcibly separated children from their families and communities so as to cut them off from their traditional culture. Children at the school were fed poorly, at one time deliberately as part of a malnutrition experiment, murdered, and abused in other ways. The residential school was closed in 1973 and in 2009 it was demolished. Strength from Within is an art installation by Connie Watts located in Port Alberni that commemorates survivors of and those whose people died at the Alberni School. The installation depicts two thunderbirds, adorned with West Coast designs, and a third without any cultural symbols to represent the horrors of the residential school era.

Port Alberni Mill opened as a kraft pulp mill in 1946, followed by two paper machines in 1957.

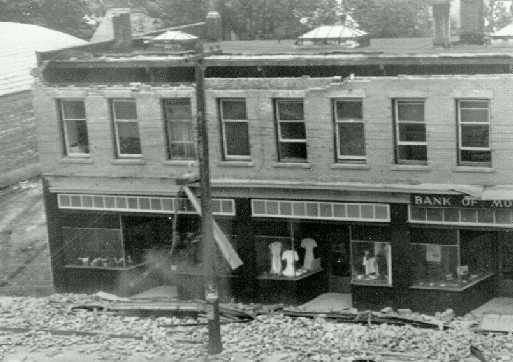
Damage to Bank of Montreal in Port Alberni by the 1946 Vancouver Island earthquake.

The 1946 Vancouver Island earthquake was a 7.3 magnitude earthquake that struck at 10:15 a.m. on Sunday, 23 June 1946. The main shock epicentre occurred in the Forbidden Plateau area north of Port Alberni. While most of the large earthquakes in the Vancouver area occur at tectonic plate boundaries, the 1946 Vancouver Island earthquake was a crustal event. Shaking was felt from Portland, Oregon to Prince Rupert, British Columbia. The earthquake is remembered as one of the most damaging earthquakes in the history of British Columbia.

In 1955, the Alberni Athletics Senior-A Men's Basketball Team had an outstanding year. The Alberni Athletics won the Canadian Senior Basketball Championships at home. A young Jim Robson honed his sports reporting skills doing the play-by-play on radio station CJAV. The Alberni Athletics were inducted into the BC Sports Hall of Fame in 2001.

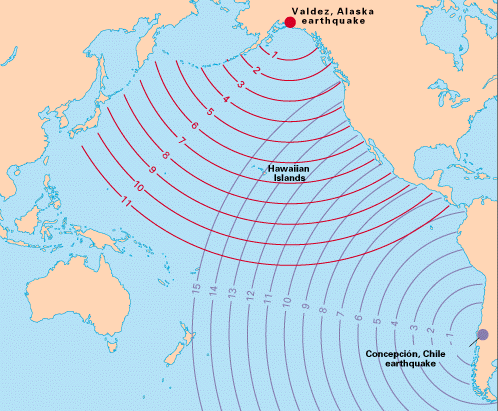
Good Friday tsunami

In 1964, Port Alberni was hit by a tsunami during the Good Friday earthquake. The water rose about 30 cm (1 ft) in a minute reaching 3 m (10 ft) above the high-water mark. About 375 homes were damaged and 55 were washed away, however there were no injuries or fatalities.

In 1967, the neighbouring towns of Alberni (on the north) and Port Alberni (on the south) amalgamated to form the city of Port Alberni.

Today, the town is a hub for local, regional, and provincial government, and its West Coast General Hospital provides services to west coast communities like Bamfield, Tofino, and Ucluelet. Currently, Port Alberni is in the process of developing itself as a tourism destination, making use of the natural environment of the area.

== Geography ==
Located at the head of the Alberni Inlet, Port Alberni lies adjacent to this natural harbour as well as the Somass River. The other end of the inlet is located on Barkley Sound, which includes the Broken Group Islands, considered to be one of the best areas for kayaking in the world. Sproat Lake is located 10 km (6.2 mi) west of the city, and the valley is guarded by the snow-covered peaks of the Beaufort range, Mount Arrowsmith and Mount Klitsa, and surrounded by mountains on all sides. Kuth-kah-chulth, is the Nuu-Chah-Nulth name for Mount Arrowsmith.

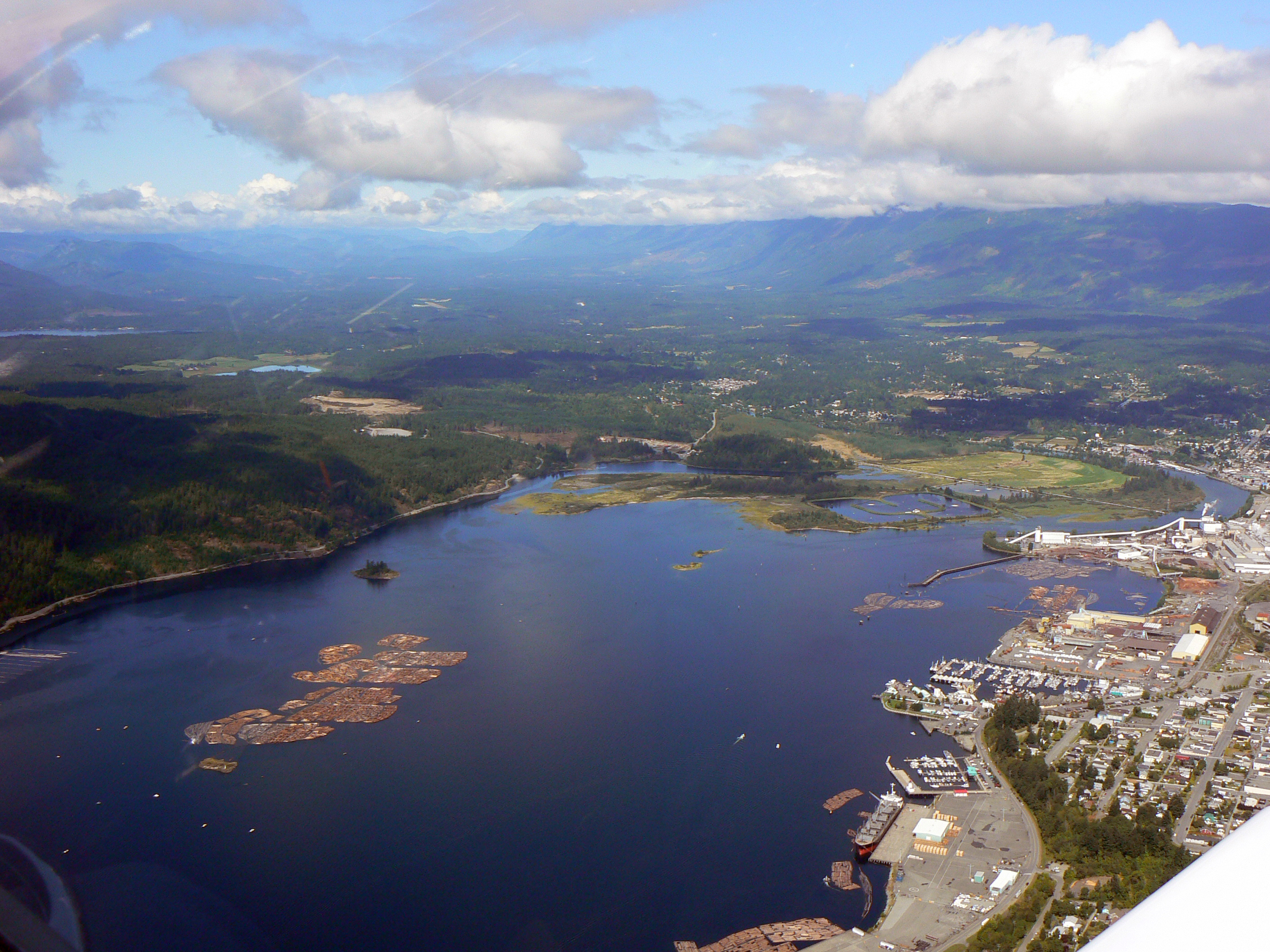
Head of the inlet

The city itself owes its unique layout to its former "twin city" status, due to its two official city centres, as well as the numerous creeks and ravines that bisect the townsite. The former City of Alberni is now dubbed "North Port", and is centred at Highway 4 and Gertrude Street. Visitors continuing onward to the west coast will pass this intersection, marked by the historic Alberni Post Office on the southeast corner. Much of Port Alberni's recent development has occurred in the North Port area, especially "up the hill", east of the North Port downtown.

The former City of Port Alberni (now referred to as "South Port" or "Uptown") can be found about 3 km (1.9 mi) south centred around 3rd Avenue and Argyle Street. In 2004, the Capitol Theatre, a local landmark in South Port, underwent extensive renovations and emerged as a stately yet modern relic of past times. This theatre now often hosts live performances. South Port is anchored by the Harbour Quay, a waterfront collection of shops, art galleries, great food and parks. The Port Alberni railway station, the farmers' market, as well as the Maritime Discovery Centre can be found here.

The city's West End is an eclectic mix of new suburban style homes, large acreages, and two First Nations reserves. Much of the residential growth over the past decade has occurred in the city's West End, where the Westporte neighbourhood has taken shape.

The creeks and ravines that cut through the city create natural barriers; Kitsuksis Creek, Cherry Creek, Roger Creek and Dry Creek each flow through the city. The hiking trails in these creeks and ravines add to the quality of life in Port Alberni.

=== Climate ===
Port Alberni's dry July gives it a warm-summer Mediterranean climate (Köppen Csb), although it is much wetter than most such places. Although the summer months do see a relatively small amount of precipitation, the vast majority of it comes during the winter months as cool, moist air flows from the Pacific Ocean over the much colder B.C. coast. Despite its location on the relatively drier east side of Vancouver Island, the resulting weak rain shadow is not enough to keep the city dry. Despite its generally wet climate, in summer, afternoon shade temperatures quite often exceed 30 °C (86.0 °F) on average 15–30 days a year, making it one of the warmest places on Vancouver Island in the summer months.

The highest temperature ever recorded in Port Alberni was 42.7 °C (108.9 °F) on 28 June 2021. The coldest temperature ever recorded was −21.7 °C (−7.1 °F) on 14 January 1950.

Climate data for Port Alberni Airport, 1981–2010 normals, extremes 1917–present (Note: Climate data was recorded at Port Alberni from July 1917 to December 1971 and at Port Alberni Airport from November 1969 to present.)
Month	Jan	Feb	Mar	Apr	May	Jun	Jul	Aug	Sep	Oct	Nov	Dec	Year
Record high °C (°F)	15.6 (60.1)	19.4 (66.9)	24.2 (75.6)	30.6 (87.1)	34.1 (93.4)	42.7 (108.9)	41.1 (106.0)	39.4 (102.9)	35.6 (96.1)	29.3 (84.7)	20.6 (69.1)	16.7 (62.1)	42.7 (108.9)
Mean daily maximum °C (°F)	5.4 (41.7)	7.4 (45.3)	11.5 (52.7)	14.2 (57.6)	18.0 (64.4)	20.7 (69.3)	24.2 (75.6)	25.5 (77.9)	22.3 (72.1)	14.9 (58.8)	8.1 (46.6)	4.5 (40.1)	14.7 (58.5)
Daily mean °C (°F)	3.0 (37.4)	3.8 (38.8)	6.4 (43.5)	8.7 (47.7)	12.0 (53.6)	14.9 (58.8)	17.4 (63.3)	18.0 (64.4)	14.9 (58.8)	10.0 (50.0)	5.3 (41.5)	2.4 (36.3)	9.7 (49.5)
Mean daily minimum °C (°F)	0.5 (32.9)	0.1 (32.2)	1.3 (34.3)	3.2 (37.8)	6.1 (43.0)	8.9 (48.0)	10.6 (51.1)	10.5 (50.9)	7.5 (45.5)	5.1 (41.2)	2.5 (36.5)	0.4 (32.7)	4.7 (40.5)
Record low °C (°F)	−21.7 (−7.1)	−15.6 (3.9)	−13.9 (7.0)	−7.8 (18.0)	−5.6 (21.9)	0.0 (32.0)	2.2 (36.0)	1.1 (34.0)	−3.9 (25.0)	−8.5 (16.7)	−16.8 (1.8)	−17.4 (0.7)	−21.7 (−7.1)
Average precipitation mm (inches)	290.9 (11.45)	255.3 (10.05)	190.1 (7.48)	126.6 (4.98)	78.5 (3.09)	55.3 (2.18)	26.1 (1.03)	38.5 (1.52)	49.1 (1.93)	204.4 (8.05)	316.6 (12.46)	276.0 (10.87)	1,907.3 (75.09)
Average rainfall mm (inches)	275.7 (10.85)	234.6 (9.24)	180.6 (7.11)	125.6 (4.94)	78.5 (3.09)	55.3 (2.18)	26.1 (1.03)	38.5 (1.52)	49.1 (1.93)	203.3 (8.00)	305.9 (12.04)	255.9 (10.07)	1,829 (72.01)
Average snowfall cm (inches)	15.4 (6.1)	22.2 (8.7)	10.1 (4.0)	1.0 (0.4)	0.0 (0.0)	0.0 (0.0)	0.0 (0.0)	0.0 (0.0)	0.0 (0.0)	1.1 (0.4)	9.6 (3.8)	20.7 (8.1)	80.0 (31.5)
Average precipitation days (≥ 0.2 mm)	20.0	17.3	17.7	17.9	14.5	12.4	6.7	6.9	8.6	15.6	21.6	19.6	178.5
Average rainy days (≥ 0.2 mm)	18.4	15.2	17.2	17.9	14.5	12.4	6.7	6.9	8.6	15.5	21.0	17.1	171.3
Average snowy days (≥ 0.2 cm)	3.4	3.6	2.6	0.5	0.0	0.0	0.0	0.0	0.0	0.1	1.9	5.1	17.2
Average relative humidity (%) (at 15:00 LST)	88.3	77.5	65.8	58.6	59.4	57.7	52.7	47.7	52.5	70.8	83.6	87.5	66.8
Mean monthly sunshine hours	24.3	58.1	111.8	150.5	191.4	193.8	262.8	262.6	195.8	103.1	35.0	22.1	1,611.2
Percentage possible sunshine	9.0	20.4	30.4	36.6	40.3	40.0	53.7	58.8	51.6	30.7	12.7	8.6	32.8
Source: Environment Canada

== Demographics ==
In the 2021 Census of Population conducted by Statistics Canada, Port Alberni had a population of 18,259 living in 8,451 of its 8,919 total private dwellings, a change of 3.3% from its 2016 population of 17,678. With a land area of 19.66 km^{2} (7.59 sq mi), it had a population density of 928.7/km^{2} (2,405.4/sq mi) in 2021.

The median total household income in 2020 for Port Alberni was $67,000.

One major characteristic known is the twin city demographic, where previously there were the distinct Port Alberni and Alberni municipalities, the remnants remain with two distinct city centres.

=== Ethnicity ===
Panethnic groups in the City of Port Alberni (1986−2021)
Panethnic group	2021		2016		2011		2006		2001		1996		1991		1986	
Panethnic group	Pop.	%	Pop.	%	Pop.	%	Pop.	%	Pop.	%	Pop.	%	Pop.	%	Pop.	%
European (Note: Statistic includes all persons that did not make up part of a visible minority or an indigenous identity.)	13,975	77.81%	13,290	76.73%	14,400	82.81%	14,295	82.51%	14,320	81.67%	15,235	83.48%	14,875	81.42%	15,175	83.72%
Indigenous	2,860	15.92%	3,030	17.49%	2,205	12.68%	2,050	11.83%	2,320	13.23%	1,410	7.73%	1,920	10.51%	1,465	8.08%
South Asian	465	2.59%	495	2.86%	385	2.21%	665	3.84%	590	3.36%	1,165	6.38%	1,025	5.61%	1,170	6.46%
East Asian (Note: Statistic includes total responses of "Chinese", "Korean", and "Japanese" under visible minority section on census.)	230	1.28%	285	1.65%	205	1.18%	155	0.89%	190	1.08%	275	1.51%	295	1.61%	280	1.54%
Southeast Asian (Note: Statistic includes total responses of "Filipino" and "Southeast Asian" under visible minority section on census.)	140	0.78%	90	0.52%	70	0.4%	30	0.17%	35	0.2%	45	0.25%	45	0.25%	15	0.08%
African	115	0.64%	55	0.32%	60	0.35%	45	0.26%	50	0.29%	65	0.36%	40	0.22%	0	0%
Latin American	75	0.42%	20	0.12%	30	0.17%	50	0.29%	20	0.11%	30	0.16%	60	0.33%	20	0.11%
Middle Eastern (Note: Statistic includes total responses of "West Asian" and "Arab" under visible minority section on census.)	20	0.11%	25	0.14%	0	0%	0	0%	0	0%	0	0%	10	0.05%	0	0%
Other/multiracial (Note: Statistic includes total responses of "Visible minority, n.i.e." and "Multiple visible minorities" under visible minority section on census.)	80	0.45%	35	0.2%	30	0.17%	35	0.2%	10	0.06%	25	0.14%	—N/a	—N/a	—N/a	—N/a
Total responses	17,960	98.36%	17,320	97.97%	17,390	98.01%	17,325	98.73%	17,535	98.8%	18,250	97.17%	18,270	98.63%	18,125	99.36%
Total population	18,259	100%	17,678	100%	17,743	100%	17,548	100%	17,748	100%	18,782	100%	18,523	100%	18,241	100%
Note: Totals greater than 100% due to multiple origin responses

=== Religion ===
According to the 2021 census, religious groups in Port Alberni included:

- Irreligion (11,365 persons or 63.3%)
- Christianity (5,785 persons or 32.2%)
- Sikhism (215 persons or 1.2%)
- Hinduism (125 persons or 0.7%)
- Buddhism (110 persons or 0.6%)
- Indigenous Spirituality (85 persons or 0.5%)
- Islam (70 persons or 0.4%)
- Judaism (30 persons or 0.2%)

Religious groups in Port Alberni (1991−2021)
Religious group	2021		2011		2001		1991	
Religious group	Pop.	%	Pop.	%	Pop.	%	Pop.	%
Christian	5,785	32.21%	7,650	43.98%	9,300	53.04%	12,000	65.68%
Sikh	215	1.2%	265	1.52%	425	2.42%	725	3.97%
Hindu	125	0.7%	20	0.11%	145	0.83%	225	1.23%
Buddhist	110	0.61%	120	0.69%	45	0.26%	50	0.27%
Indigenous spirituality	85	0.47%	35	0.2%	N/A	N/A	N/A	N/A
Muslim	70	0.39%	0	0%	0	0%	0	0%
Jewish	30	0.17%	0	0%	0	0%	15	0.08%
Other religion	180	1%	105	0.6%	140	0.8%	30	0.16%
Irreligious	11,365	63.28%	9,195	52.86%	7,475	42.63%	5,225	28.6%
Total responses	17,960	98.36%	17,395	98.04%	17,535	98.83%	18,270	99.28%

== Health and education ==
Public education is offered by School District 70 Alberni, which operates 11 schools in Port Alberni. A new multimillion-dollar state of the art high school opened in 2012–2013.

The Conseil scolaire francophone de la Colombie-Britannique operates one Francophone primary school: école des Grands-cèdres. It also provides a French-English school.

Health services are provided in town by West Coast General Hospital, operated by the Vancouver Island Health Authority (VIHA).

== Economy ==
The chief source of industry in Port Alberni is forestry, commercial fishing, and tourism. In the 1950s, 60's and 70's the forestry labour force in Port Alberni was one of the highest paid in the country. However, over the last fifteen years there has been a decline in the forestry industry and a consequent relative decline in the economy of the city and of its residents. The Alberni Valley's forests consist primarily of Douglas fir, hemlock, yellow cedar and western red cedar. Most of the old growth forests have been logged with current logging coming from second growth forests. Port Alberni Mill, owned by Catalyst Paper, sits on the edge of the Alberni Inlet. It produces 340,000 tonnes of directory paper and lightweight coated paper each year. There is also a lumber mill, Alberni Pacific Division, that also sits on the inlet. Several smaller sawmills exist throughout the valley. Farming is also practised in the valley.

Port Alberni also serves as a hub for those travelling to the West Coast of Vancouver Island, including Ucluelet, Tofino and Pacific Rim National Park. As commodities tend to be much pricier in these remote areas, campers and travellers often do their shopping in Port Alberni before continuing their journey. This has resulted in development along the Johnston Road (Highway 4) corridor, including several big box retailers, grocery stores and strip mall developments. Previously, eco-tourism companies have set up shop in the Alberni Valley, taking advantage of the city's location on the fringe of wilderness yet proximate location to Vancouver and Victoria. For example, there's a kayaking, ATV touring, a windsurfing and a glider company.

== Sports ==
Port Alberni has a rich sporting history and is home to several major facilities, including the multi-purpose Alberni Valley Multiplex (home of the Alberni Valley Bulldogs of the BCHL), Bob Dailey Stadium, and the Alberni Athletic Hall.

In 1955, the city's basketball team, the Alberni Athletics, won the Canadian Senior Basketball Championship on their home court, a victory considered a major event in the city's history, leading to the team's induction into the BC Sports Hall of Fame in 2001.

== Salmon ==
A team of salmon enhancement volunteers and the Department of Fisheries and Oceans have worked to improve salmon habitats throughout the Alberni Valley, adding a Coho hatchery at the McLean Mill National Historic Site, in addition to the successful Robertson Creek Hatchery on the Stamp River. Port Alberni was awarded the World Fishing Network's "Ultimate Fishing Town" designation in 2010.

== Attractions ==
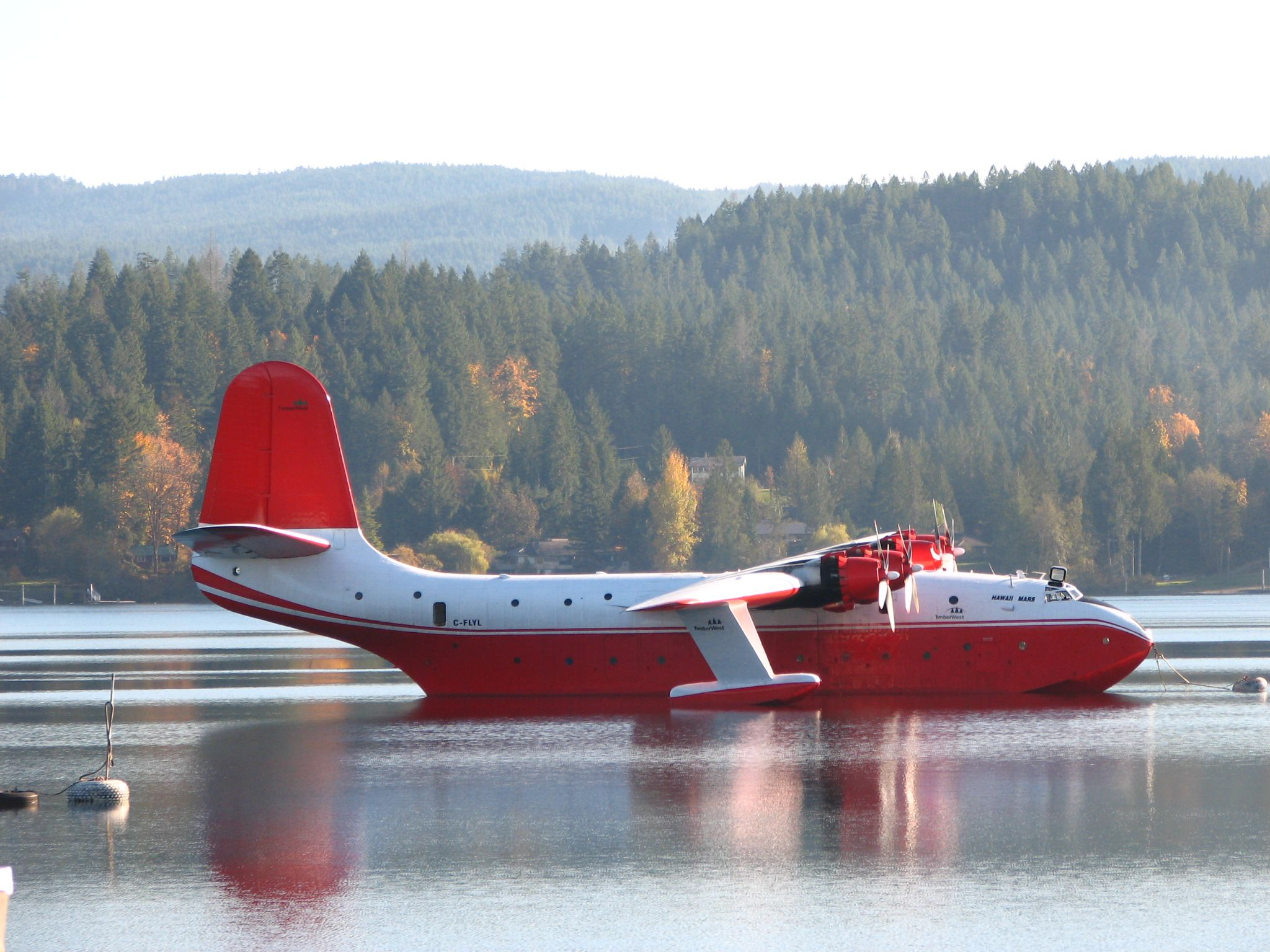
Martin Mars Water Bomber

Port Alberni sits beneath Mount Arrowsmith and is almost completely surrounded by mountains. These mountains provide hiking, walking, and mountain biking trails. It also provides an opportunity to view wildlife, including deer and black bears.

The city is also known for its fishing. Its waters contain five different species of salmon and yearly runs of steelhead. Halibut can also be found in the saltwater inlets near the city.

The state-of-the-art Robertson Creek Fish Hatchery is the most successful hatchery on Vancouver Island, producing chinook salmon, coho salmon, and steelhead smolts. It is located a short drive west of Port Alberni. and is open to the public.

Port Alberni is home to the McLean Mill National Historic Site which incorporates a steam railway from the downtown harbour to the saw mill up the valley. The historic mill offers demonstrations, including operating the old mill. The Alberni Valley has a museum and many ancillary attractions, including Sproat Lake, which is located just outside Port Alberni.

The world's largest aerial firefighting flying boats, two Martin Mars Water Bombers, made their home on nearby Sproat Lake, operated by Forest Industries Flying Tankers from the 1960s, then the Coulson Group from 2007; both aircraft were retired and relocated to museums, in 2024 and 2025. This lake is also a summer destination for local residents and cottagers from surrounding areas. The provincial lake also provided petroglyphs carved First Nations many years ago.

Besides the offers from nature, the city has two quays, Harbour Quay and Victoria Quay, which have shops, restaurants, and art galleries along the inlet. On some autumn evenings, when the inlet's tide is low, black bears can be spotted looking for fish on the other side of Victoria Quay.

The Alberni Valley Multiplex in Port Alberni is home to the Alberni Valley Bulldogs, a Junior-A hockey team in the BCHL.

Della Falls, the 16th tallest waterfall in Canada (442 m (1,450 ft)), is accessible by boat from Great Central Lake or by helicopter. Helicopters are not allowed to land in Strathcona Provincial Park.

== Transportation ==
Port Alberni Airport (CBS8) is located 11 km (6.8 mi) north west of the city. The airport has a 4,000 ft (1,200 m) runway with another additional 2,500 ft (760 m) of taxiways and apron. The airport is home to a number of key tenants, including Coulson Aircrane, Canadian Aero Technologies, Alberni Valley Flying Club and Vancouver Island Helicopters.

The main highway to Port Alberni is Highway 4, known locally as the Alberni Highway and the Pacific Rim Highway. It is the longest east–west main vehicle route on Vancouver Island, with a total length of 163 km (101 mi). The highway to Port Alberni was completed in 1942, and has been designated as Highway 4 since 1953. The highway starts at Qualicum Beach, then reaches Port Alberni from which it continues on to Tofino and Ucluelet.

Port Alberni is served by the Island Rail Corridor branch line from Parksville known as the Port Alberni Subdivision.

=== Port operations ===
The Port of Port Alberni regularly receives large oceangoing cargo vessels, such as the Hong Kong-based OYSTER BAY and the Bergen-based STAR LINDESNES, as well as tugs, fishing boats, and search and rescue vessels.

The Port Alberni Port Authority was created in 1999. Under the Canada Marine Act, the Port Alberni Port Authority is responsible for the Alberni Inlet from the Somass River to Tzartus Island.

== Notable people ==
- Paul Boyd, Canadian and American television journalist (Inside Edition)
- Kim Campbell, 19th Prime Minister of Canada from 25 June to 4 November 1993; the first woman to hold this office.
- George Clutesi (1905–1988) became a Tseshaht artist, actor and writer as well as an expert on and spokesman for First Nations cultures. In 1959, he received the British Columbia Centennial Award and the Canada Centennial Medal in 1967. He was commissioned to paint a mural for Expo 67. Emily Carr was so impressed with his work that in her will she left him her brushes, oils and unused canvases. He died in Victoria in 1988.
- Travis Cross, Olympic wrestler
- Wilhelm Alexander, German born painter, art instructor, and television host.
- Paul Cyr, drafted into the NHL by the Buffalo Sabres in the first round (9th overall) in 1982.
- David Dziurzynski, Ottawa/ Binghamton Senators NHL/ AHL forward.
- Leo, Gerry and Myles Fitzgerald (born 26 August 1993[1]) are Canadian former child actors and current ice hockey players best known for their joint roles as Sylvester (Sly) and Whit in the 1999 film, Baby Geniuses.[2] They also appeared in the sequel, Superbabies: Baby Geniuses 2, in 2004.
- Leonard Frank, photographer
- Laurent Brossoit, NHL goaltender with the Anaheim Ducks
- Rick Hansen, Canadian paraplegic athlete and activist for people with spinal cord injuries who is most famous for his Man in Motion world tour to raise money for the cause and show the physical capabilities of such people.
- Jim Hiller, current head coach of the National Hockey League's Los Angeles Kings.
- Rick Jasken, soccer player and 1989 Francophone Games gold medalist.
- Eric Jespersen, bronze medalist at the 1992 Olympics
- Jamie Lowery, former soccer player and member of Canada's national team at the 1986 World Cup.
- Dakota Morton, youngest Canadian radio host; created the record and set it on 16 January 1999, at the age of 10 years 218 days. Record was awarded while Dakota was hosting his radio show at CJAV radio in Port Alberni.
- Kenneth Oppel, Canadian writer of the Silverwing & Matt Cruse series.
- Davis Payne, ice hockey player and coach
- Rob Shick, has been with the NHL as an official since 1 September 1984
- Alec Thomas, fisherman, trapper, longshoreman, logger, "anthropologist", interpreter, and Tseshaht politician.
- Harry Zolnierczyk, Nashville Predators forward
- Jim Robson, the iconic voice of the Vancouver Canucks, started his legendary broadcasting career in Port Alberni
- Bryer Schmegelsky and Kam McLeod, primary suspects of the 2019 Northern British Columbia murders of a tourist couple and UBC professor, and were subjects of a nationwide manhunt.
- Lauren Spencer-Smith is a singer who appeared on season 18 of American Idol and became popular on TikTok in 2021 with songs like "Back to Friends" and "Fingers Crossed".

== See also ==
- Alberni Valley Heritage Network
- Bainbridge Lake
- CJAV-FM 93.3 (known on-air as "The Peak")
- Cox Lake (British Columbia)
- MyAlberni
