= Pacific Rim National Park Reserve =

National park reserve in British Columbia, Canada

- Réserve de parc national Pacific Rim
- IUCN category VI (protected area with sustainable use of natural resources)
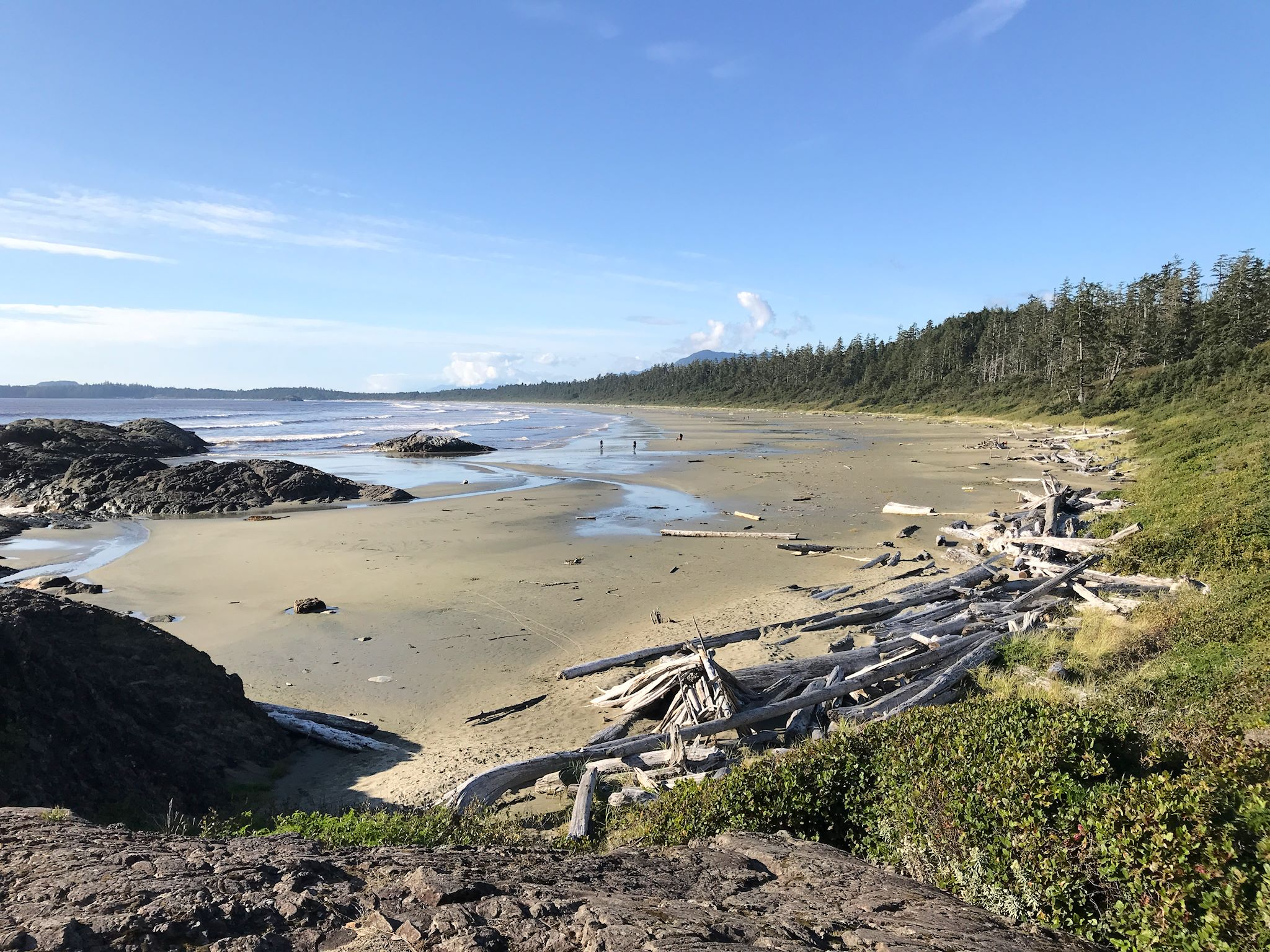
- Long Beach in Pacific Rim National Park Reserve on Vancouver Island

- Location within British Columbia Location within Canada
- Interactive map of Pacific Rim National Park Reserve
- Location: Vancouver Island, British Columbia, Canada
- Nearest city: Tofino and Ucluelet
- Coordinates: 48°38′10″N 124°46′09″W
- Area: 511 km^{2} (197 sq mi) marine: 221 km^{2} (85 sq mi) terrestrial: 290 km^{2} (110 sq mi)
- Established: 1970
- Visitors: 1,163,362 (in 2022–23)
- Governing body: Parks Canada
- Website: parks.canada.ca/pn-np/bc/pacificrim

Pacific Rim National Park Reserve is a 511 km^{2} (197 sq mi) national park located in British Columbia, Canada, which comprises three separate regions: Long Beach, the Broken Group Islands, and the West Coast Trail. It is located in the Pacific Coast Mountains, which are characterized by rugged coasts and temperate rainforests.

Widespread vegetation found in the park includes western hemlock, Sitka spruce, western red-cedar, deer fern and sword fern. Animal species vary from marine and intertidal species, such as humpback whales and ochre sea star, to terrestrial mammals, such as Vancouver Coastal Sea wolves. For recreational purposes, Long Beach is used for surfing and windsurfing, the Broken Group for sea kayaking, and the West Coast Trail for hiking, as well as camping in all areas and scuba diving in the winter months in the Long Beach and Broken Group areas.

The Wickaninnish Beach Provincial Park formed the nucleus upon which the national park was assembled. After years of negotiation between the federal government and the provincial government of W.A.C. Bennett, a breakthrough was reached after Jean Chrétien took over for Arthur Laing as the federal minister responsible for parks. British Columbia adopted the West Coast National Park Act in 1969, and the two governments signed an agreement in 1970 to create the park through land assembly and extinguishing forestry rights. Following protracted negotiations, the park was finally added to the National Parks Act in 2000, classified as a "park reserve" based on an accepted claim of certain rights to the area by the Nuu-chah-nulth Tribal Council.

== History ==
The early popularity of national parks, like Banff and Yoho, created speculation about other potential parks, like one on Vancouver Island with access to the Pacific Ocean. The recreational potential of Long Beach was known and the nonprofit Canadian National Parks Association put forward the idea, in 1929, of it becoming a park. In 1930, at the request of the federal government, the provincial government placed a reserve on land in the Nitinat Lake area, and in 1948, the provincial government reserved land that would later become the Wickaninnish Beach Provincial Park.

Reconnaissance trips by government representatives, one of them being Hugh Llewellyn Keenleyside, found insufficient rationale for establishing a park there at that time, due to its remote and inaccessible location, outstanding forestry encumbrances, and with respect to its development as a health resort–type park, its cold waters, and fog, among other reasons. Regardless, in 1947 the Victoria Chamber of Commerce added their voice to advocating park here, in the form of an addition to the Strathcona Provincial Park with land along the Clayoquot Arm to Long Beach.

In 1959, the provincial government opened both the Wickaninnish Beach Provincial Park (which was expanded in 1961 and 1968) and Highway 4, from Tofino to Port Alberni. The highway resulted in thousands of new visitors descending on the beaches each year throughout the 1960s, including for international surfing competitions from 1966 to 1968. Though new tourist accommodations did open, some along the beach, the number of visitors far exceeded Tofino and Ucluelet's capacity, resulting in many camping on the beach. This led to a plundering of the foreshore for food and souvenirs, building temporary shacks from driftwood, improvised latrines, and left-behind garbage and vehicles sunk in the sand.

The deteriorating conditions of the beach and the inability of the local community and the province to cope fueled a more urgent call for a national park, particularly by the Vancouver Island Chambers of Commerce and local MLA Howard McDiarmid. However, communication and negotiations with federal Minister of Resources Arthur Laing with the provincial Minister of Recreation and Conservation Ken Kiernan and the cabinet of W.A.C. Bennett were strained, as they disagreed on the appropriate size of the park and cost-sharing, in addition to their political animosity. The project would only advance after 1968 when Jean Chrétien replaced Laing, as Pierre Trudeau succeeded Lester B. Pearson as prime-minister.

The BC government was hesitant to relinquish rights to the Effingham Islands portion of the Broken Group and to lose forestry activities in the West Coast Trail area, but proceeded to adopt the West Coast National Park Act in early 1969 which authorized the Minister of Recreation and Conservation to enter into an agreement with the federal government to establish the national park along the west coast of Vancouver Island. The final agreement was shortly reached and endorsed by the province in Order-in-Council 1466/1970 with the province responsible for acquiring lands and the federal government paying for half the costs. Following the agreement, lands were assembled by the province within the areas delineated by the agreement and transferred them the federal government with both paying the acquisition costs equally. The Wickaninnish Beach Provincial Park was transferred to federal government in 1971 to form the core of the Long Beach Unit and the province purchased or expropriated the private lands around the beach, along with the crown lands of the Broken Group Islands.

The park's opening ceremony occurred in 1971 and was attended by Princess Anne of England who was presented with a driftwood abstract sculpture by Jean Chrétien, the minister responsible for Parks Canada. The sculpture was the work of local artist Godfrey Stephens. However, the acquisition deadline of 1975 was missed as the two governments and the companies with the timber rights on the provincial crown land, B.C. Forest Products Limited and MacMillan Bloedel, could not reach a compensation settlement. By 1982, the Broken Group Unit and most of the Long Beach Unit had been secured but all of the West Coast Trail Unit was tied up in the disagreement on the value of the timber; an appraisal by the provincial forestry ministry of the value of the timber rights that would secure the remaining lands was deemed unacceptably high by the federal counterparts. An agreement was finally reached in 1988 to transfer the remaining lands, free of encumbrances, and the park was formally included into the National Parks Act in 2000 with Bill C-27 of the second session of the 36th Canadian Parliament.

=== Aboriginal presence ===
The Canada National Parks Act classifies national parks where the geographic area is subject to a claim in respect of aboriginal rights that has been accepted for negotiation by the Government of Canada as a "park reserve" which allows for the continuing of traditional renewable resource harvesting activities by aboriginal persons. Related to the Pacific Rim National Park Reserve, the Nuu-chah-nulth Tribal Council had submitted a claim in 1980 which the government accepted for negotiation in June 1983. In the early park formation little consultation had occurred with the First Nations whose interests in the land they intended to purchase or trade for other similar lands. While seven First Nations claim area within the park as part of their traditional territory, Parks Canada incorporated a working relationship with those interested in its management. Beginning in 1995 the First Nations Program resulted in the creation of the Nuu-chah-nulth interpretative trail, cultural information included in educational literature and displays, increased employment in park services, and shared management responsibilities.

The park boundaries exclude 21 Indian reserves belonging to seven different First Nations, though most of the park is claimed as part of their traditional territories which were never ceded, including the Huu-ay-aht, Ditidaht, Pacheedaht, and the Hupacasath. In the Long Beach area where the Tla-o-qui-aht claim traditional territory, they have declared the entire Kennedy Lake watershed, as well as Meares Island, as a tribal park. In the Broken Group area, an archaeological site on Benson Island found evidence of human presence dating back more than 5000 years, though the Tseshaht are the only remaining group whose people had lived on the islands. While Benson Island had hosted a summer village (and wintered in the area now known as Port Alberni), it had been abandoned; a subsequent village on Effingham burnt down in 1914.

== Geography ==
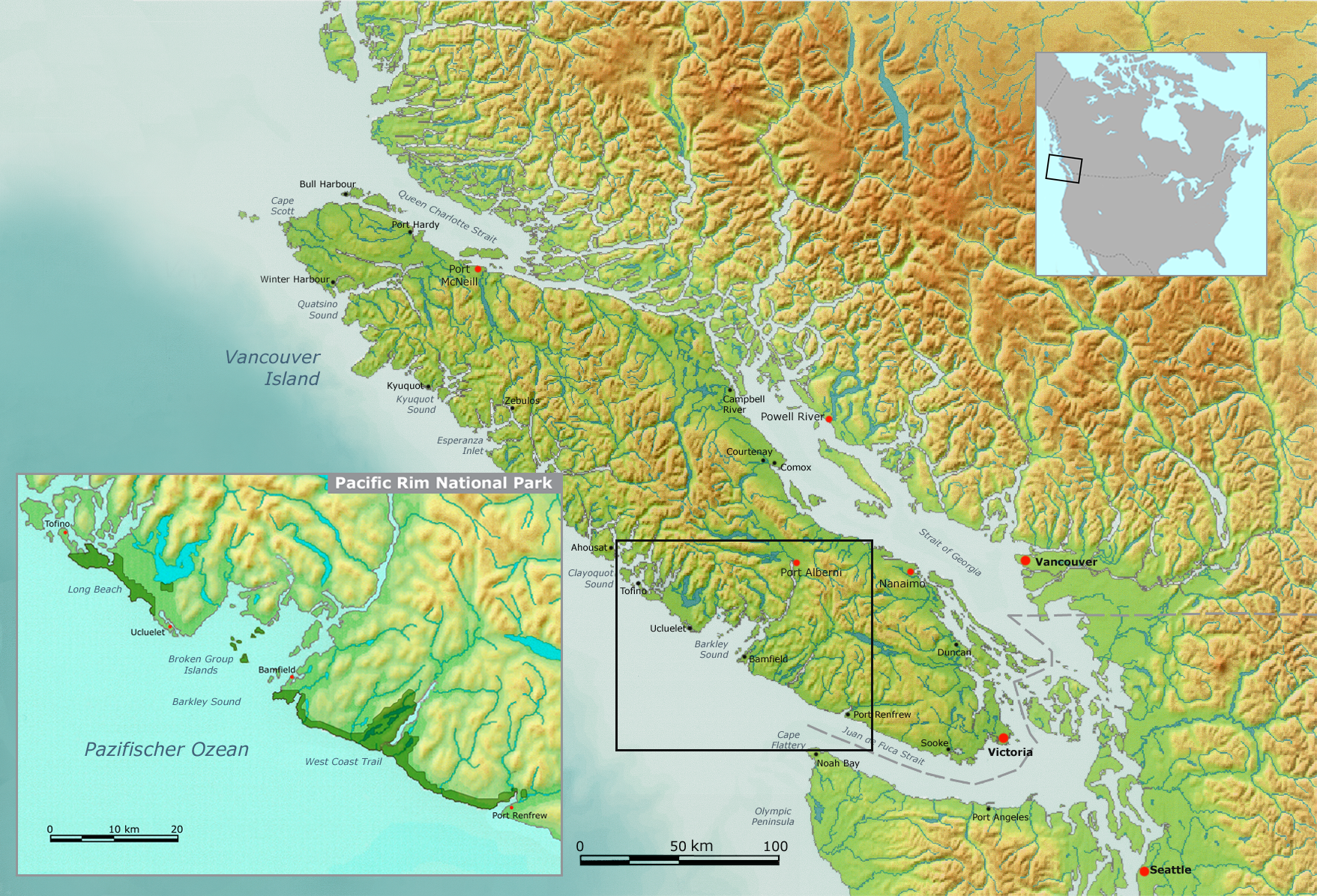

In the Parks Canada system of natural region representation, the Pacific Rim National Park Reserve, along with the Gwaii Haanas National Park Reserve, represents Pacific Coast Mountains. Geographically, this natural region includes Vancouver Island, Haida Gwaii and the Coast Mountains. Based on its landscape and habitat diversity, Parks Canada characterizes this region as Canada's rocky west coast created by crustal material moving eastward creating coastal mountains, deep fiords and channels carved by the release of water from retreating glaciers, and experiencing heavy rainfall and mild temperatures resulting in temperate rain forests.

=== Long Beach ===
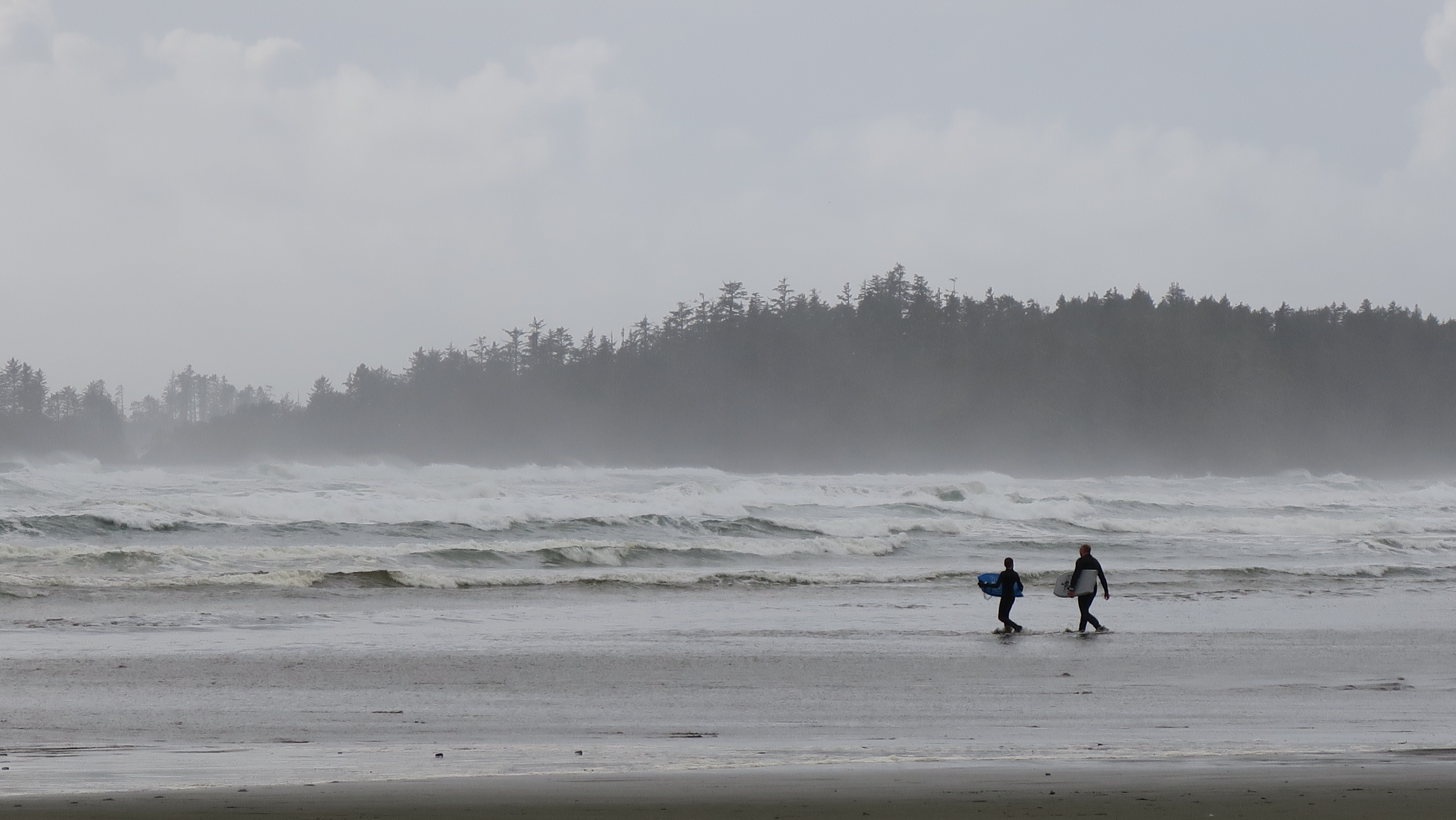
Bodyboarders approaching waves on Long Beach, February 2016.

The 212 km^{2} (82 sq mi) Long Beach Unit, located along Highway 4 between Tofino to Ucluelet, features several beaches, short trails, and a campground. Wickaninnish Bay is bordered by the eponymous Long Beach, as well as Combers Beach, and Wickaninnish Beach, while Florencia Bay to the south includes a more sheltered beach. The two bays are connected by a 3 km (1.9 mi) Nuu-chah-nulth Trail and the K^{W}isitis Visitor Centre (formerly Wickaninnish Interpretive Centre). The Pacific Rim Visitor Centre, located at the park entrance along Highway 4, is the park's primary information centre and meeting area. A separate park administrative and maintenance building is located further down the highway, closer to the campground and airport. The Tofino-Long Beach Airport, owned and operated by the Alberni-Clayoquot Regional District, is an enclave within the park.

On the north side of the Long Beach Unit is Grice Bay. Its boat launch can be used for paddling around the bay or to access the Clayoquot Sound or the Browning Passage around the Esowista Peninsula to the ocean. The exclave portion at Kennedy Lake is a day use area for picnics and swimming but the area is flanked on both sides by the Kennedy Lake Provincial Park which has a campground and boat launch.

=== Broken Group Islands ===
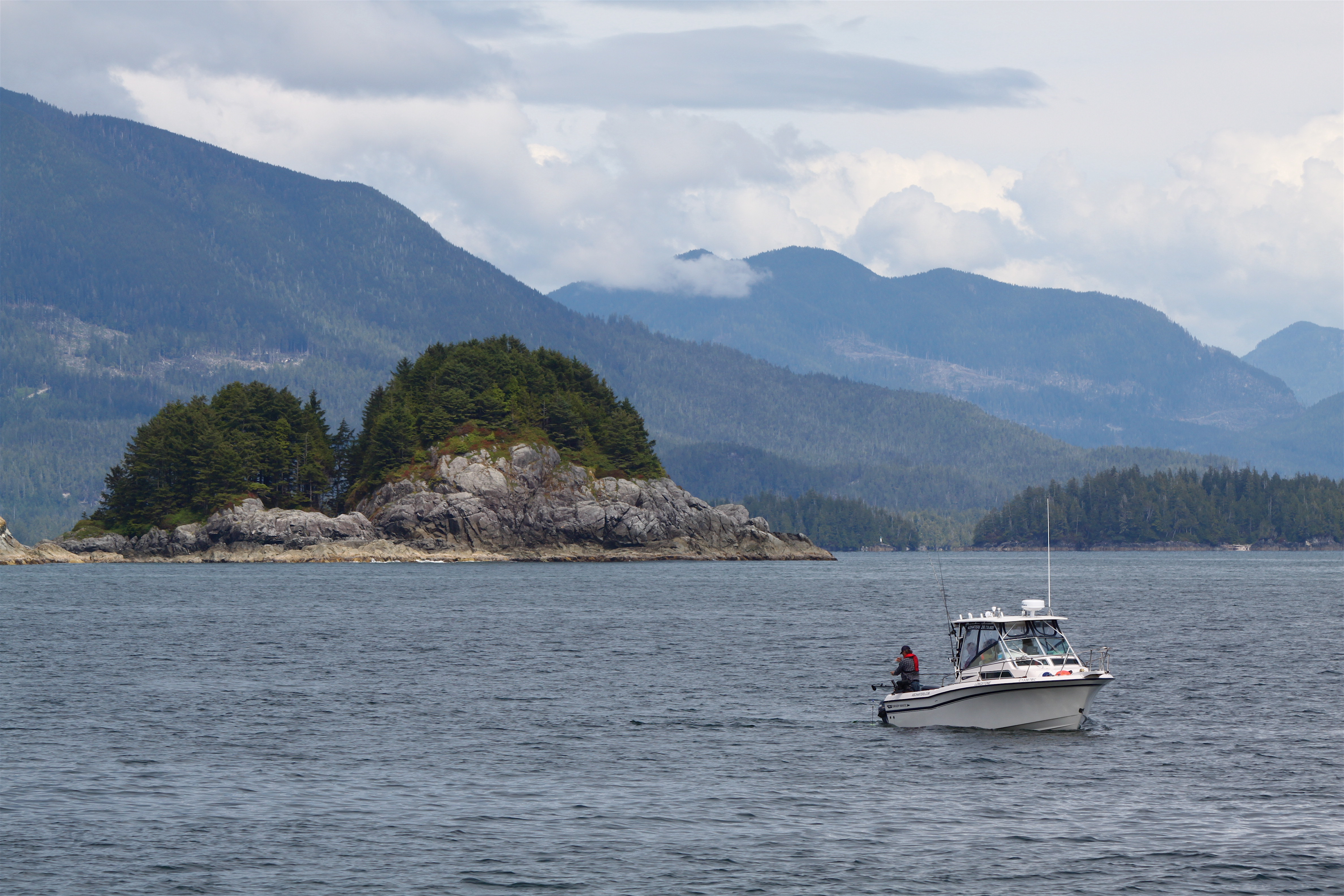
Fishing boat in Barkley Sound backdropped by islands of the Broken Group

The Broken Group Islands unit is a 106 km^{2} (41 sq mi) area in the Barkley Sound with over one hundred small islands. The area is predominantly marine with high-relief rock reefs and kelp beds anchored by a rocky substrate. The island beaches vary from shallow sand terrain to exposed weathered rock. The south side of the outer islands, such as Wouwer, Howell, Cree and Benson Islands, are subject to strong winds and swells, as are the Crossing Imperial Eagle and Loudon Channels between the group and Vancouver Island. The islands are uninhabited though archaeological sites show there are several abandoned village sites.

For recreational purposes, the area is predominantly used for sea kayaking, as well as related camping and wildlife viewing. Other marine vessels pass through the area but Parks Canada prohibits motorboats from landing on islands with campsites. Kayaks are most often launched from Toquart Bay to the north, but sometimes from Ucluelet which is 13 km from the first campsite at Clarke Island or from Bamfield which is 15 km from Gibraltar Island. Other boats can dock at Port Alberni. For multi-day trips, Parks Canada maintains campgrounds on seven of the islands: Hand, Turret, Gibraltar, Willis, Dodd, Clarke and Gilbert islands. The names of the islands are derived from an 1861 survey map of the area by George Henry Richards. There was formerly a campground on Benson Island but ended in 2009 at the request of the Tseshaht First Nation, though day-trips area are still permitted.

=== West Coast Trail ===
The West Coast Trail Unit covers 193 km^{2} (75 sq mi) and features the 75 km (47 mi) hiking trail between Port Renfrew and Bamfield. The corridor was created in 1889 as an extension of a telegraph line from Victoria to lighthouses along the coast, and eventually to Bamfield, the Canadian terminus of the All Red Line. After the disaster of the American steamship SS Valencia, in 1906 with 37 survivors reaching shore along the telegraph line, the federal government upgraded the corridor to act as a trail with several shelters along the way. By 1911, it was classified as a public highway with a 20 m (66 ft) right-of-way known as the Life Saving Trail or the Shipwrecked Mariners Trail. The federal government ended its maintenance program for the trail between Port Renfrew and Carmanah Point in 1954, and the remainder of the trail by 1967. Meanwhile, there were several failed attempts at development, including coal mining, fish canning, resort development in Clo-oose, and small-scale logging—the result of which are several abandoned donkey engines along the trail used to transfer logs down to the foreshore. Eventually the provincial government sold the timber rights but following advocacy by Sierra Club Canada and locals, the BC Parks branch placed a reserve, in 1964, around the trail which outdoor enthusiasts had continued using. With a national park being proposed at Long Beach, to which the federal government felt was too small by itself to be a national park, they were amenable to adding this trail. Sympathetic with the logging interests, the provincial government resisted but it was included in the 1970 agreement with its specific boundaries to be determined. Over the next several years, the provincial government, forestry companies, and park advocates negotiated and finalized the boundaries, with conservationists advocating for boundaries to include the entire watersheds and federal government advocating for a visual buffer between the trail and logging areas. While the Nitinat Triangle, northwest of Nitinat Lake, was added in 1973, the final boundaries were not agreed upon until 1988. In the meantime, there was a lack of trail maintenance since BC Parks viewed it as a national park though the land had yet to be transferred to the federal government, though Parks Canada did invest in repairs and improvements in 1973 and the early 1980s, including bridges and cable cars over creeks and various campsite facilities. The southern trailhead is located across Gordon River from Port Renfrew with first two campsites 5 and 13 km in. The northern trailhead is located across the Pachena River from Bamfield. From there, the Pachena Point Light is 10 km (6.2 mi) in and the first two campsites are at the 12 km and 14 km markers along the trail. The northern end of the trail, outside of Bamfield, also features a separate 7 km (4.3 mi) trail to Cape Beale with a campsite at Keeha Beach. Overall, the trail is typically done in 6 or 7 days with stretches along rocky beaches, rainforest, and rough, muddy terrain.

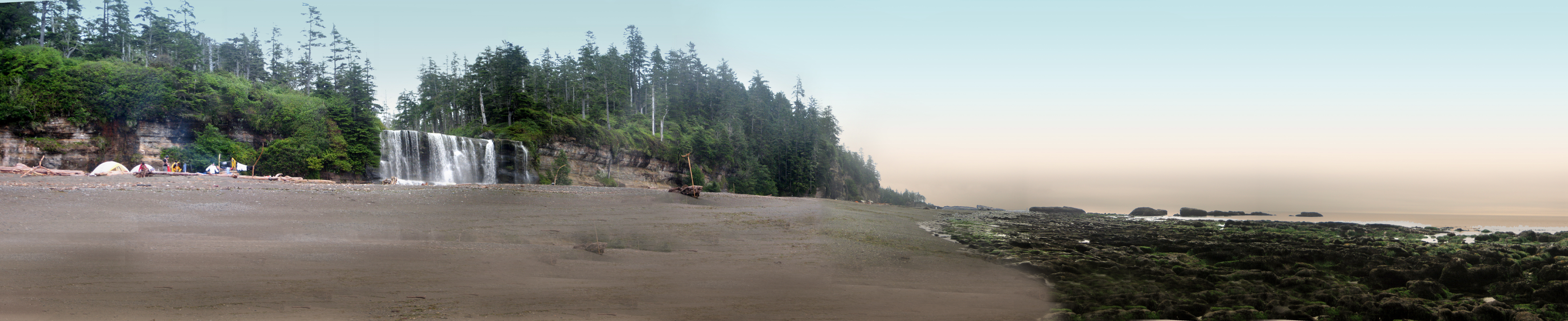
Tsusiat Falls, a campground on the West Coast Trail.

The Pacific Rim National Park Reserve, along with the Gwaii Haanas and Gulf Islands National Park Reserve, are the three national parks with direct access to the Pacific Ocean. Located on the west side of the Vancouver Island, the park is situated on the Estevan Lowlands, a thin strip of coastal land located between the ocean and the West Vancouver Island Fiordlands and Vancouver Island Ranges of the Insular Mountains. While the almost all of Vancouver Island is part of the Wrangellia Terrane, most of the Long Beach Unit is part of the Pacific Rim Terrane, separated from Wrangellia Terrane by the West Coast Fault.

== Climate ==
Like the climates of nearby Tofino and Ucluelet, the park's climate is the result of its unobstructed southwestern exposure to the ocean and its inland mountains to the northeast. The prevailing jet stream brings low pressure systems off the ocean from the Gulf of Alaska in the winter. Its cool, moist air mass experience orographic lift as it immediately rises through the mountains and deposits large quantities of precipitation. Hucuktlis Lake, inland from Broken Group in Barclay Sound, is one of the wettest places on Earth. The park area averages over 3,500 to 4,000 millimetres (140 to 160 in) of precipitation per year. Affected by the Kuroshio Current, the sea water temperatures range from 8 °C (46 °F) in January to 14 °C (57 °F) in August. In the summer the jet stream bring high pressure systems, with warmer air masses that retains moisture, in from the mid-Pacific resulting in drier, sunny summers. The air temperatures generally range from 5 to 18 °C (41 to 64 °F).

Climate data for Ucluelet
Month	Jan	Feb	Mar	Apr	May	Jun	Jul	Aug	Sep	Oct	Nov	Dec	Year
Record high °C (°F)	16.5 (61.7)	19.0 (66.2)	19.5 (67.1)	24.0 (75.2)	28.0 (82.4)	30.5 (86.9)	33.5 (92.3)	30.0 (86.0)	27.0 (80.6)	26.5 (79.7)	17.0 (62.6)	16.5 (61.7)	33.5 (92.3)
Mean daily maximum °C (°F)	8.4 (47.1)	9.2 (48.6)	10.3 (50.5)	12.4 (54.3)	15.0 (59.0)	17.1 (62.8)	19.0 (66.2)	19.1 (66.4)	18.2 (64.8)	13.9 (57.0)	10.4 (50.7)	8.5 (47.3)	13.5 (56.3)
Daily mean °C (°F)	5.5 (41.9)	5.5 (41.9)	6.6 (43.9)	8.4 (47.1)	10.9 (51.6)	13.2 (55.8)	15.0 (59.0)	15.0 (59.0)	13.7 (56.7)	10.2 (50.4)	7.2 (45.0)	5.5 (41.9)	9.7 (49.5)
Mean daily minimum °C (°F)	2.6 (36.7)	1.8 (35.2)	2.8 (37.0)	4.3 (39.7)	6.7 (44.1)	9.2 (48.6)	10.9 (51.6)	11.0 (51.8)	9.2 (48.6)	6.4 (43.5)	4.0 (39.2)	2.6 (36.7)	6.0 (42.8)
Record low °C (°F)	−9 (16)	−11 (12)	−4.5 (23.9)	−2 (28)	−1 (30)	2.5 (36.5)	5.0 (41.0)	5.5 (41.9)	1.5 (34.7)	−3 (27)	−6 (21)	−9.5 (14.9)	−11 (12)
Average precipitation mm (inches)	501.8 (19.76)	353.1 (13.90)	322.3 (12.69)	266.5 (10.49)	165.9 (6.53)	147.2 (5.80)	78.5 (3.09)	87.6 (3.45)	139.6 (5.50)	345.3 (13.59)	492.2 (19.38)	451.1 (17.76)	3,351.1 (131.93)
Average rainfall mm (inches)	495.0 (19.49)	343.8 (13.54)	316.4 (12.46)	265.8 (10.46)	165.9 (6.53)	147.2 (5.80)	78.5 (3.09)	87.6 (3.45)	139.6 (5.50)	354.2 (13.94)	489.2 (19.26)	444.4 (17.50)	3,318.7 (130.66)
Average snowfall cm (inches)	6.8 (2.7)	9.3 (3.7)	5.9 (2.3)	0.76 (0.30)	0.0 (0.0)	0.0 (0.0)	0.0 (0.0)	0.0 (0.0)	0.0 (0.0)	0.05 (0.02)	3.0 (1.2)	6.7 (2.6)	32.4 (12.8)
Average precipitation days (≥ 0.2 mm)	22.5	18.8	21.6	18.2	15.9	13.8	9.4	10.0	12.0	19.2	22.7	21.7	205.8
Average rainy days (≥ 0.2 mm)	22.3	18.5	21.4	18.2	15.9	13.8	9.4	10.0	12.0	19.2	22.5	21.5	204.7
Average snowy days (≥ 0.2 cm)	1.8	2.0	1.5	0.32	0.0	0.0	0.0	0.0	0.0	0.04	0.65	1.8	8.0
Source: Environment Canada

== Ecology ==
=== Inland ecology ===
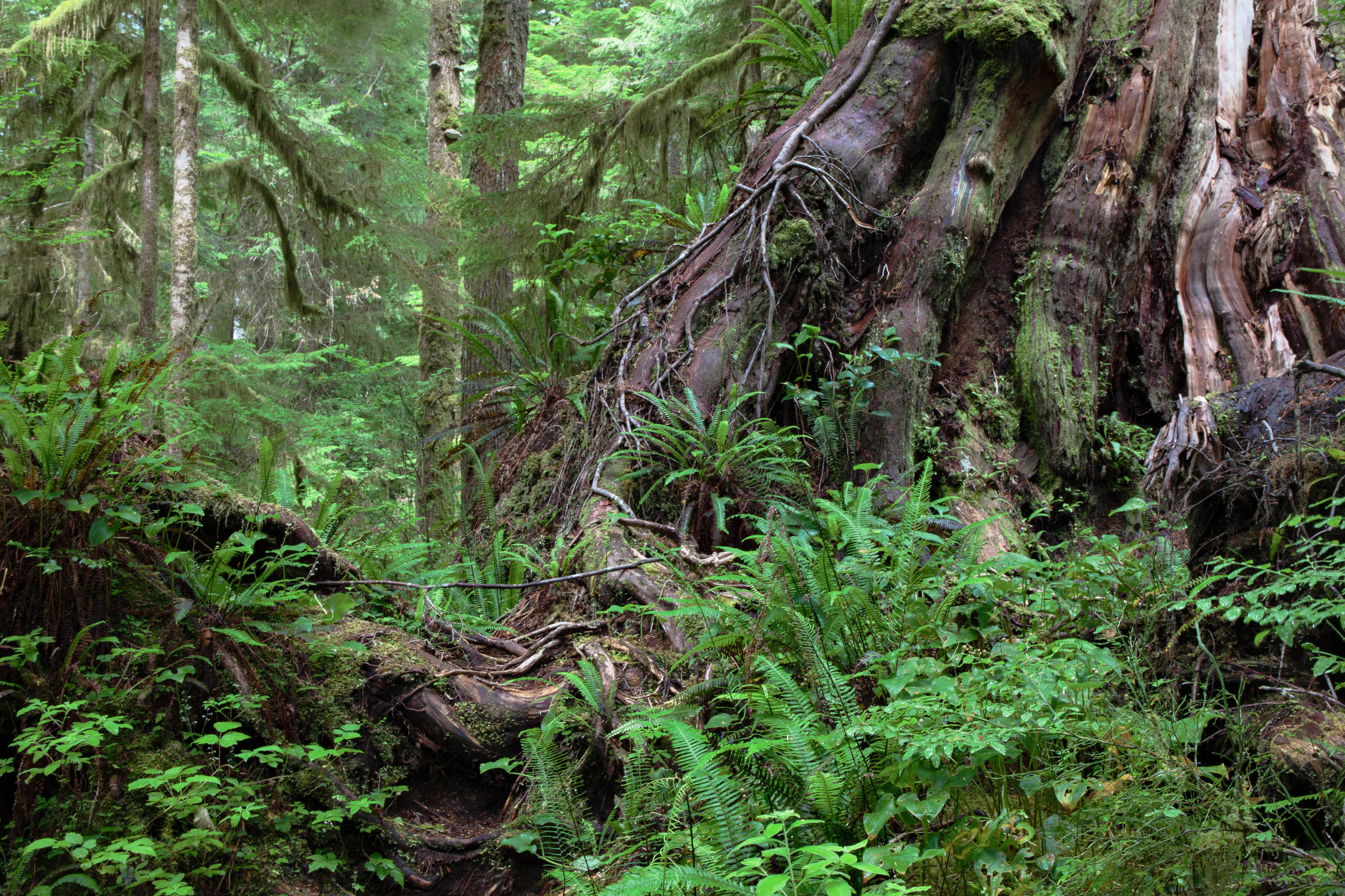
Fern and moss understory of the park's temperate rainforest

The terrestrial portion of the park lies within what the province terms the Coastal Western Hemlock Biogeoclimatic Zone (very wet hypermaritime subzone), based on the climax vegetation. The wet, temperate and cool climate results in temperate rainforest conditions. The area's exposure to strong winds in the winter, sunny summers and low elevations make the large and sturdy western hemlock, Sitka spruce and western red-cedar the dominant tree species. There understory is dominated by moss (like Sphagnum), lichen and ferns (like deer fern and sword ferns). The forest is home to black bears, Vancouver Island cougar, Roosevelt elk, and marten, as well as numerous invertebrates like the banana slug and warty jumping-slug and birds like the marbled murrelet and the olive-sided flycatcher. Vancouver Island wolves are even present on the islands of the Broken Group. Six species of salmon are present in the park's watercourses, but are predominantly coho and sockeye. Cutthroat trout, red-legged frog, western toad, mink and river otter live in the lakes and wetland areas.

The park also protects Cheewhat Giant, a western red cedar tree that is the largest known tree in Canada and one of the largest trees in the world.

=== Coastal ecology ===
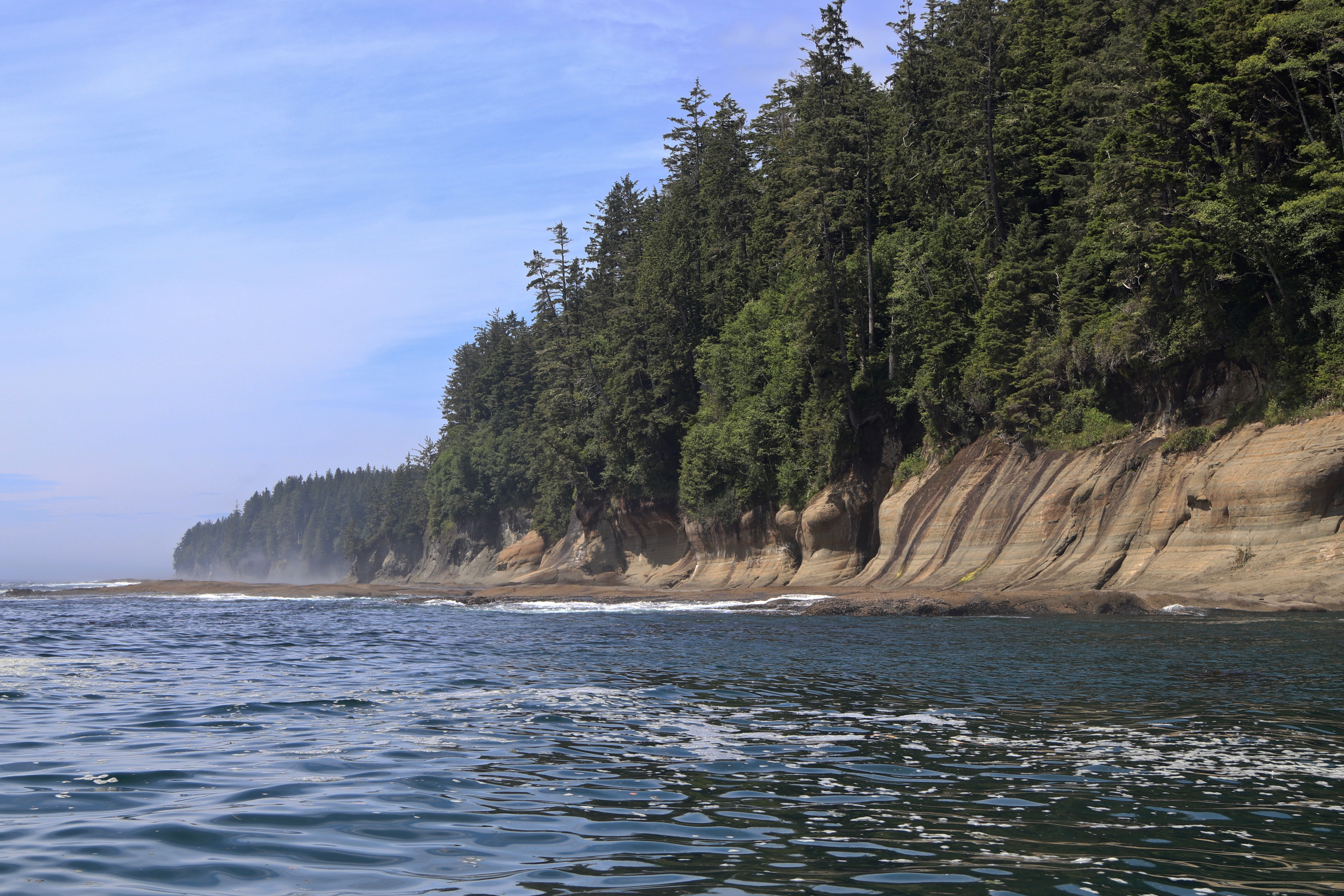
Densely forested sandstone bluffs, looking northwest toward Carmanah Point

The shoreline's sand dune habitat consists of pink and yellow sand-verbena, dune grass, seaside centipede lichen, black oystercatchers, and glaucous-winged gulls. The intertidal zone provides habitat for eelgrass, Aggregating anemone, echinoderms (like the western sand dollar and ochre sea star), sea snails (like the northern abalone), and crabs. Native bivalvia like butter clam, littleneck clam, California mussel and Olympia oyster compete with the invasive Manila clam, varnish clam, and Pacific oyster.

The park also includes a subtidal area where there exists several kelp forests, habitat for Steller sea lions, seals and porpoises, and parts of migratory routes for killer whales, humpback whales, grey whales, basking sharks, and pacific herring.

== See also ==
- National Parks of Canada
- List of National Parks of Canada
- List of British Columbia Provincial Parks
