= Alberni Pacific Railway =

Canadian heritage railway

Coordinates: 49.23516°N 124.81241°W

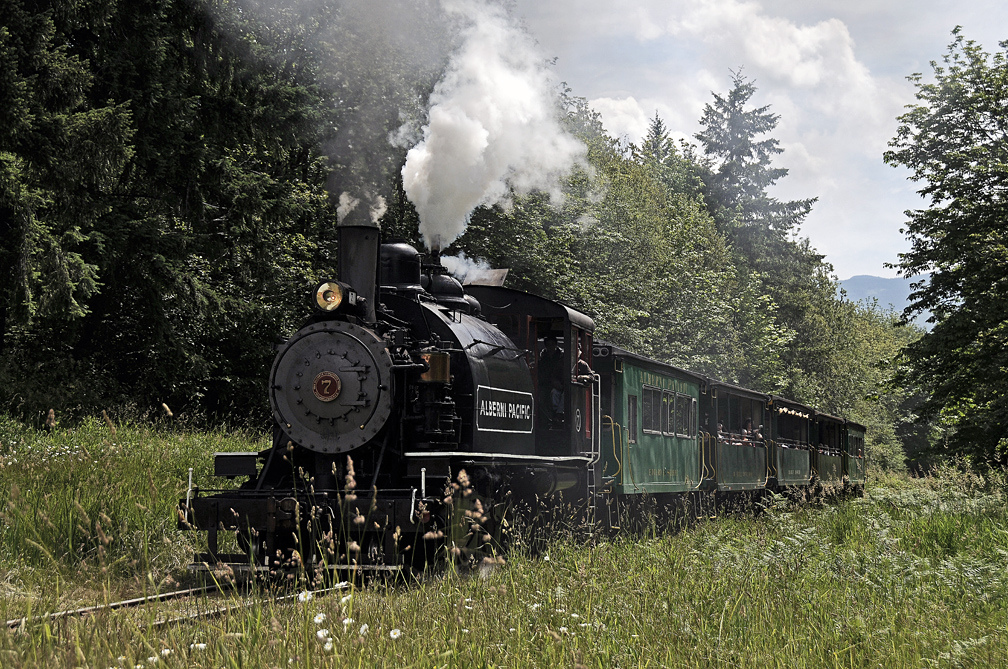
- Alberni Pacific No. 7 hauls the train along the line
- Locale: Vancouver Island; British Columbia

Commercial operations
- Built by: Canadian Pacific Railway
- Original gauge: 4 ft 8 1/2 in (1,435 mm) standard gauge

Preserved operations
- Owned by: Track: Island Corridor Foundation
- Operated by: Alberni Pacific Railway
- Reporting mark: (?)
- Stations: Port Alberni
- Preserved gauge: 4 ft 8 1/2 in (1,435 mm)

Commercial history
- Opened: 1912 into Port Alberni
- Closed: Dormant

Preservation history
- Headquarters: Port Alberni

Website
- ihsportalberni.ca

The Alberni Pacific Railway is a heritage railway originating in Port Alberni, British Columbia. The Alberni Pacific Railway returned to operations along the Port Alberni Waterfront in summer of 2024, and is expected to run until the end of September. The Santa Train will also return in 2024 along with other popular events.

== History ==
The Alberni Pacific Railway began heritage operations in 1984 overseen by the Western Vancouver Island Industrial Heritage Society. Their primary motive power was Alberni Pacific No. 2 Two-Spot, which was retired in 1996 and replaced by the No. 7 steam locomotive.

On June 16, 2026, a fire engulfed the restored 1930s Comox Logging and Railway No. 104 crew speeder, destroying the rail car entirely. This came after repeated vandalism to the speeder, volunteer vehicles, and general railway equipment, with the electrical cables coupling passenger cars being cut on June 8. A group of three youth were promptly arrested after security footage found them to have started the fire inside the rail car before quickly escaping. The railway intends to preserve the crew speeder and restore it in the future if possible.

== Rolling stock ==
The railway is powered by locomotive No. 7, a 1929 Baldwin 2-8-2ST steam locomotive departing from the 1912 CPR Station. It uses rebuilt Canadian National Railway transfer cabooses as passenger cars. The 40-minute excursions go to the McLean Mill National Historic Site.

Along with the steam locomotives, there is an Alco RS3 diesel electric locomotive. There are five running coaches, three open and two covered.

=== Locomotive roster ===
- No. 2 is a Lima 42-short-ton (37.5-long-ton; 38.1 t) 2-truck Shay steam locomotive. It is on display on special occasions. It no longer holds pressure due to boiler problems.
- No. 7 is a Baldwin 90-short-ton (80-long-ton; 82 t) 2-8-2ST. This engine returned to service in November 2024 following a 6-year repair.
- No. 112 is a Baldwin 75-short-ton (67-long-ton; 68 t) 2-6-2ST. It is currently in the initial stages of rebuilding.
- No. 11 diesel is a World War II locomotive built in 1942 later used as a MacMillan Bloedel switching locomotive and weighs 45 short tons (40.2 long tons; 40.8 t). This locomotive is used as the back-up motive power for trains on the APR if the No. 7 breaks down.
- No. 8427 is an ALCO RS-3. It weighs 120 short tons (107 long tons; 109 t) and has a 1,600 hp (1,200 kW) output. It is out of service requiring work on its wheels. 8427 was built in 1954 for the Canadian Pacific Railway. It was purchased by Crown Zellerbach Ltd. around 1970's and used in their logging operation in Ladysmith. The Western Vancouver Island Industrial Historical Society acquired it around 1994–1995. This unit is believed to be the last surviving unit of a CP RS-3.

=== Alberni Pacific 2 ===
Alberni Pacific 2
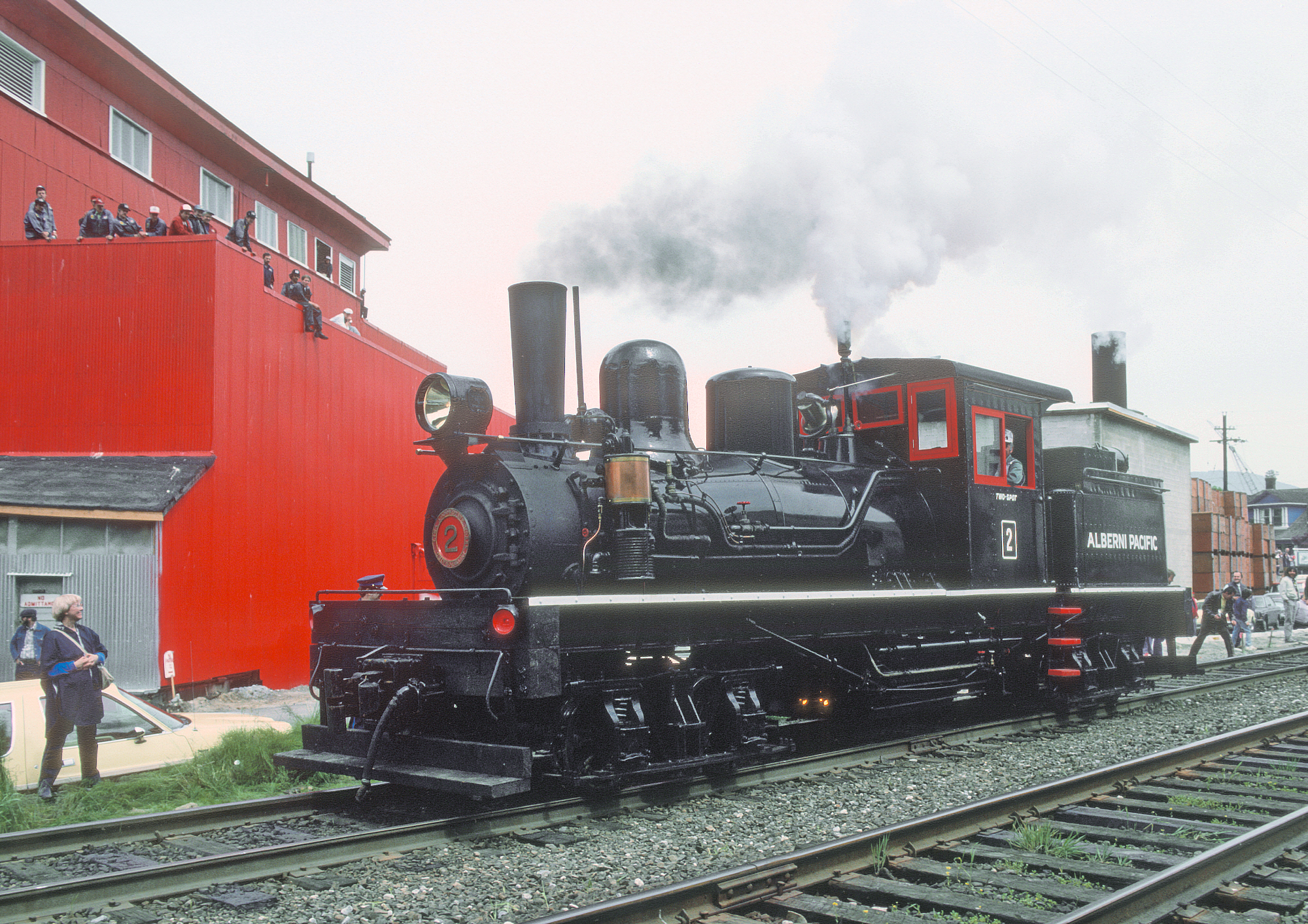
Type and origin
- Power type: Steam
- Builder: Lima Locomotive Works
- Serial number: 2548
- Build date: June 28, 1912
- Total produced: 1
- Rebuilder: Robert Swanson
- Rebuild date: 1980-1984
Specifications
- Configuration
  - Whyte: 2-truck Shay
  - AAR: B-B
  - UIC: B′B′ n3t
- Gauge: 1,435 mm (4 ft 8 1/2 in)
- Driver dia.: 29.5 in (0.749 m)
- Wheel diameter: 29 in (0.737 m)
- Adhesive weight: 29.5 lb (13.4 kg)
- Loco weight: 84.000 lb (38.102 kg)
- Fuel capacity: 1.5 Cords / 2 Tons
- Water cap.: 1,560 gal
- Boiler pressure: 180 psi (1.24 MPa)
- Cylinder size: 10 in × 12 in (250 mm × 300 mm)
Performance figures
- Maximum speed: 17.1 km/h (11 mph)
- Tractive effort: 16.900 lbf (0.08 kN)
- Factor of adh.: 4.79
Career
- Numbers: Weist Logging Co. 1 US Army 7089; Alberni Pacific 2 MacMillian Bloedel 2
- Retired: 1950
- Restored: August 1984
- Disposition: Static Display

==== Revenue service (1912–1950) ====
Alberni Pacific No. 2 is a Class B Shay locomotive built on June 28, 1912 by the Lima Locomotive Works originally as Weist Logging Co. No. 1. In 1918, the locomotive was sold to the Alberni Pacific Lumber Company at Franklin River, British Columbia as "US Army No. 7089". Between 1936 and 1952, the locomotive operated as "Alberni Pacific No. 2" in the Ash River Valley. The engine was retired in 1950 and the locomotive was donated to the City of Alberni in 1952. It stood on display in a small park at the corner of Third Avenue and Redford Street until 1978.

==== Excursion service (1984–1994) ====
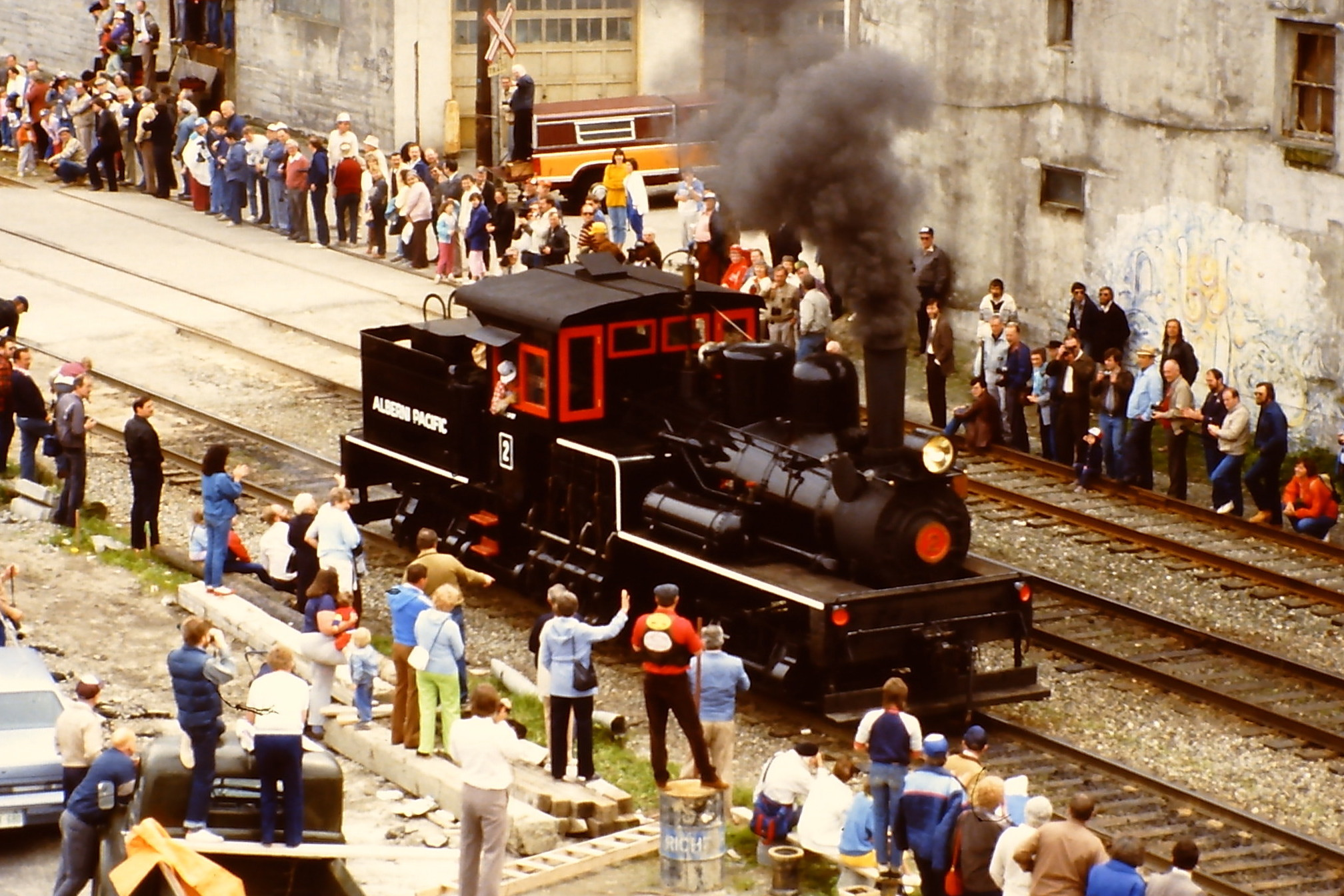
Alberni Pacific No. 2 at SteamExpo 86 in Vancouver

In 1980, Robert Swanson decided to restore the locomotive into operating condition, and the locomotive returned to service in August 1984. In May 1986, it participated at SteamExpo 86 in Vancouver, British Columbia. In 1994, the locomotive made its last run. As of 2024 the locomotive is on static display with no plans of returning it to operation.

== See also ==
- Alberni Valley Heritage Network
- List of heritage railways in Canada
