= George Clutesi =

Canadian artist, actor and writer

- Born: 1905; Port Alberni, British Columbia, Canada
- Died: 27 February 1988 (aged 82 or 83); Victoria, British Columbia, Canada
- Occupations: Artist, actor, writer

George Clutesi CM (1905 – 27 February 1988), was a Tseshaht artist, actor and writer, as well as an expert on and ambassador for all Canadian First Nations culture.

== Biography ==
Clutesi was born in Port Alberni, British Columbia in 1905. He was raised in his mother's home village in the Broken Group after her death when he was four. His father and aunts recognized his abilities at an early age and encouraged him to develop his talents. He sought refuge in his art from the pressures brought to bear on him at the Alberni Residential School. At the school, Indigenous children were driven to forget their heritage and culture in an effort to force them to assimilate into white settler culture.

As an adult, Clutesi worked as a fisherman and as a pile driver to support his wife and five children. With the encouragement of friends, he began to paint in oils and to exhibit his work during the 1940s and 1950s. Emily Carr was so impressed with his work that in her will she left him her brushes, oils and unused canvases. In 1947, Clutesi began to contribute essays to the first Aboriginal newspaper in Canada, The Native Voice. While recovering from an on-the-job injury, he met the chief of the Canadian Broadcasting Corporation in the Vancouver area, Ira Dilworth. With Dilworth's encouragement, he told stories from his heritage on CBC radio. He then wrote a play about the culture of First Nations' peoples, They were a Happy Singing People. In 1961, he addressed the British Columbia Historical Association on Northwest Coast art urging the preservation of Indigenous cultures.

In 1959, he received the British Columbia Centennial Award and the Canadian Centennial Medal in 1967. Clutesi was commissioned to paint a mural for Expo 67. The University of Victoria granted him an Honorary Doctorate in Law in 1971. He was made a Member of the Order of Canada in 1973.

Clutesi became one of the first Indigenous writers in British Columbia to gain recognition. His Son of Raven, Son of Deer (1967) was one of the first books written about the Tseshaht First Nation culture, by a Nuu-chah-nulth author. It was followed by Potlatch (1969), which portrayed elements of the Potlatch. In the late 1970s, Clutesi appeared in four movies: Prophecy, Dreamspeaker, Nightwing, and Spirit of the Wind. He won a Canadian Film Award for his portrayal of a Native shaman in Dreamspeaker. Clutesi also appeared in a number of television programs.

He died in Victoria in 1988, not long after his final television appearance on the CBC's First Nations TV series Spirit Bay, in which he played an elder who helps the local children deal with questions about their Indigenous culture.

== Filmography ==
- I Heard the Owl Call My Name (1973) – George P. Hudson
- Dreamspeaker (1976) – Old Man
- Prophecy (1979) – M'Rai
- Nightwing (1979) – Abner Tasupi
- Spirit of the Wind (1979) – George's Father
- Kelly (1981) – Clut
- The Legend of Walks Far Woman (1982) – Chief John
- Running Brave (1983) – Ben
- Gentle Sinners (1983) – Sam
- Isaac Littlefeathers (1984) – Moses Anekwat
- Toby McTeague (1986) – Chief

== TV series ==
- Spirit Bay
- Episode of The Beachcombers "The Gift"
