= Alec Thomas =

Alec Thomas was born around 1894 near Alberni, British Columbia, Canada. He was a fisherman, trapper, longshoreman, interpreter, self-taught anthropologist, and Tseshaht politician. Alec had a wife named Eva and also had a son named Bob. With him being a trapper he would lay traps for 14 miles between 2 bodies of water, the Somass River and Sprout Lake. At the end of the day, he would check each one with his wife and son, walking through his miles of traps. This is what he did for a living, hunting different animals such as fish and beavers.

Among his tribe, Alec was also known to be like a walking music recorder of Tseshaht songs. He was the one people turned to if they forgot or couldn't recall how a certain song went.

== Tseshaht Nation ==
Traditional Life

According to the migration patterns of animals and the time of the season, the Tseshaht would travel in the same order as the animals to hunt.

== Important Society and Politician Role ==
Alec didn't attend any prestige school but instead his residential school, although it was there where he enhanced his ability to learn another language. Due to him being bilingual, he became an interpreter between his people and Europeans or colonists. This made him a crucial member of the Tseshaht tribe since they often knew nothing about laws consistently being made or the rules needed to follow them. So he was there to explain how these laws and systems would work to prevent his tribe from getting fined or arrested for breaking the law. Although many wouldn't know about these laws since they were different from their own often they had to appear in court but Alec would represent and talk for them. With Alec also being bilingual, it was an important asset when it came to advocating for his tribe's rights to certain things. Which meant he eventually became a political and representative figure for his tribe. For instance, when the right to fishing was taken away, the whole community contributed to paying for Alec to catch a train to a meeting in order to discuss the matter. He refused to come back until the matter was resolved and stayed in Ottawa until so. Another example is when building a railroad threatened the Tseshaht's homes and land, so again Alex put his speaking skills for advocacy and fought for his people. Even now due to Alec's hard work his tribe has what is called “Aboriginal Rights” or indigenous rights that are still being fought for today. Alec greatly influenced the Tseshaht Nation, holding an important role in politics, activism, and society.

== Anthropology ==
In 1910, anthropologist Edward Sapir was collecting data on native people in the Port Alberni area. Following Franz Boas, a famous American anthropologist, Sapir was looking for translators who could interview people and write down their answers as part of his own research. Alec Thomas was just out of school, but was bilingual and had the ability to translate. He became intrigued by Sapir's work and collected anthropological along with linguistic information alongside him for more than 20 years. He has been described as one of the most productive indigenous linguists in North America.

Wilfred Robinson stated, "Alec held one of the last traditional potlatches. It was at athlmaqtleis, Dodd Island and lasted several days. This was probably at the time he worked for Sapir. He wanted to document a potlatch event, that way he obtains evidence that will be proof of how these ceremonies were conducted and celebrated. When potlatches became illegal, Alec threw this huge potlatch ceremony and documented the entire thing. Even though it was illegal and outlawed he wanted to throw a final, grand one for documentation of such a historical event. Also since he was an apprentice to anthropologist Edward Sapir, he was also documenting information from first-hand accounts to add to his research. His work was better documented than a lot of anthropologists."
