= Bainbridge Lake =

- Location within Vancouver Island
- Location: Vancouver Island, British Columbia
- Coordinates: 49°12′00″N 124°44′00″W
- Lake type: Natural lake, Reservoir
- Primary inflows: McFarlane Creek
- Primary outflows: McFarlane Creek
- Basin countries: Canada
- Surface area: 26 ha (64 acres)
- Max. depth: 17 m (56 ft)
- Surface elevation: 153 m (502 ft)

Bainbridge Lake is a lake located south east of Port Alberni, British Columbia, named in 1895 for William Herbert Bainbridge. The City of Port Alberni obtains water from Bainbridge Lake. The lake has a surface area of 26 hectares (64 acres) and maximum depth of 17 metres (56 ft).

== See also ==
- List of lakes of British Columbia
