= Spirit of the Wind =

- Directed by: Ralph Liddle
- Written by: Ralph Liddle; John Logue
- Produced by: Ralph Liddle; Kent Gibson (associate producer)
- Starring: Chief Dan George; Slim Pickens; Pius Savage; George Clutesi
- Cinematography: John Logue
- Edited by: Mark Goldblatt
- Music by: Will Ackerman; Buffy Sainte-Marie
- Release date: 1979
- Running time: 98 minutes (US); 93 minutes (France)
- Country: United States
- Language: English

Spirit of the Wind (also known as Attla) is a 1979 American Northern film directed by Ralph Liddle and starring Chief Dan George, Slim Pickens, Pius Savage, and George Clutesi.

== Plot summary ==
The film is a semi-biographical story based upon the early life and rise to prominence of Native American dog musher George Attla, Jr. (1933–2015). Attla, known as "the Huslia Hustler," took his nickname from one of his mentors, Jimmy Huntington, who first began winning races during Attla's childhood. In recent generations, this nickname has become associated with Attla far more than with Huntington. Attla was a leading star of the 1960s and 1970s in the sport of sprint dog sled racing. He won the Fur Rendezvous World Championship race, held in Anchorage, Alaska, 10 times between 1958 and 1982. He also won 8 championships in the Open North American Championship race, held in Fairbanks, Alaska. In addition, despite his mushing experience being geared more towards sprint than distance racing, Attla competed in the inaugural Iditarod Trail Sled Dog Race in 1973, placing fifth. In a 2011 interview, Attla spoke of the popularity of the Iditarod, and how sprint racing "is now a second-class sport" as a result.

The general theme of the story centered around Attla's rivalry with the other leading sprint competitors of the day, fellow Alaska Native Gareth Wright (the brother of political gadfly Don Wright and grandfather of modern-day dog musher Ramy Brooks) and Massachusetts musher Roland "Doc" Lombard, the preparations for an upcoming big race, and his first major race victory.

The movie was shot on location in Fairbanks, Alaska. A number of local actors, including local Alaska Natives, University of Alaska Fairbanks professor Lee Salisbury, and KFAR disc jockey/newscaster Bill Walley, appear in minor roles.

== Cast ==
- Chief Dan George as Moses
- Slim Pickens as Obie
- Pius Savage as George Attla
- George Clutesi as George's father
- Rose Attla Ambrose as Mother
- William Ambrose as Young George
- Rudy Wiehl as Young Steven
- Eileen Newman as Young Marie
- Louis Ambrose as Young Robert
- Phyllis Attla as Marie
- Curtis Erhart as Robert
- Ace Rollins as Man in truck
- Charlie Peters as Sammy Sam, the fiddler
- Lee Salisbury as Doctor
- Melinda Mattson as Nurse
- John Adams as Isaak Isugliak, the kid at the hospital
- Leonard Kriska as Wilson Paul
- Terry Edwin as Lambert
- John Allen as Job interviewer
- Merv Hilpipre as Gareth Wright
- Madeline Solomon as Moses Paul's wife
- Barbara Richards as Waitress
- Bill Walley as Sportscaster
- Dorothy Bainter as Janis
- Carol Yazzie as Sindi
- Jack Williams as Man in bar
