= Connie Watts =

Canadian artist

- Born: Port Alberni
- Education: Bachelor of Fine Arts in Intermedia Emily Carr University of Art and Design; Bachelor of Design University of Manitoba
- Known for: Mixed media art and design

Connie Watts is a mixed media artist and designer of Nuu-chah-nulth, Gitxsan and Kwakwaka'wakw ancestry. She lives and works on Coast Salish territory in Port Alberni and West Vancouver.

== Early life and education ==
Watts graduated from the Emily Carr Institute of Art and Design with a Bachelor of Fine Arts in Intermedia, and has her Bachelor of Interior Design from the University of Manitoba.

Watts began working as a professional artist after a serious injury from a car accident in 1991, which caused memory loss and difficulties with visual thinking. Before the accident, Watts worked as an Interior designer.

Watts enrolled in the Industrial Design program at Emily Carr, but eventually entered the Fine Arts program.

== Career ==
- Associate Director of Aboriginal Programming at Emily Carr University of Art & Design
- Previous member of the Emily Carr Board of Governors for six years
- Curatorial Project Manager for the 2010 Vancouver Olympic Committee
- Affiliated with the British Columbia Arts Council, the First Peoples Cultural Council, the Vancouver Foundation, and the Contemporary Art Gallery

== Art ==
Connie Watts' work draws from the aesthetic traditions of Northwest Coast Indigenous cultures, and incorporate modern fabrication and design techniques.

== Selected works ==
=== Vereinigung ===
Vereinigung is a monumental sculpture now permanently exhibited in the lobby of Harborview Medical Center in Seattle. It was previously exhibited for two years at the Museum of Anthropology. The sculpture depicts three animal figures that reflect and inform the artist's spirit: the wolf as hunter, the bear as protector, and the raven as trickster. The three animals together speak to the harmony of all life.

=== Hetux ===
Hetux is Watts’ largest indoor sculptural work, located at the Vancouver International Airport. The sculpture is named after Watts' grandmother and represents the thunderbird, which is known as the keeper of the city. It is made from powder-coated aluminum and stained baltic birch. The thunderbird is adorned with images of animals and celestial bodies that represent intensity, determination, joy and prosperity.

=== Strength from Within ===
Strength from Within is an art installation located in Port Alberni, British Columbia that commemorates survivors of and those whose people died at the Alberni Indian Residential School. The installation depicts two thunderbirds, adorned with West Coast designs, and a third without any cultural symbols to represent the horrors of the residential school era.
