= Benson Island, British Columbia =

Island in British Columbia, Canada

Benson Island
Native name: C'isaa or Ćišaa?uḥ, also spelled Ts'isha' or Ts'isha?atH
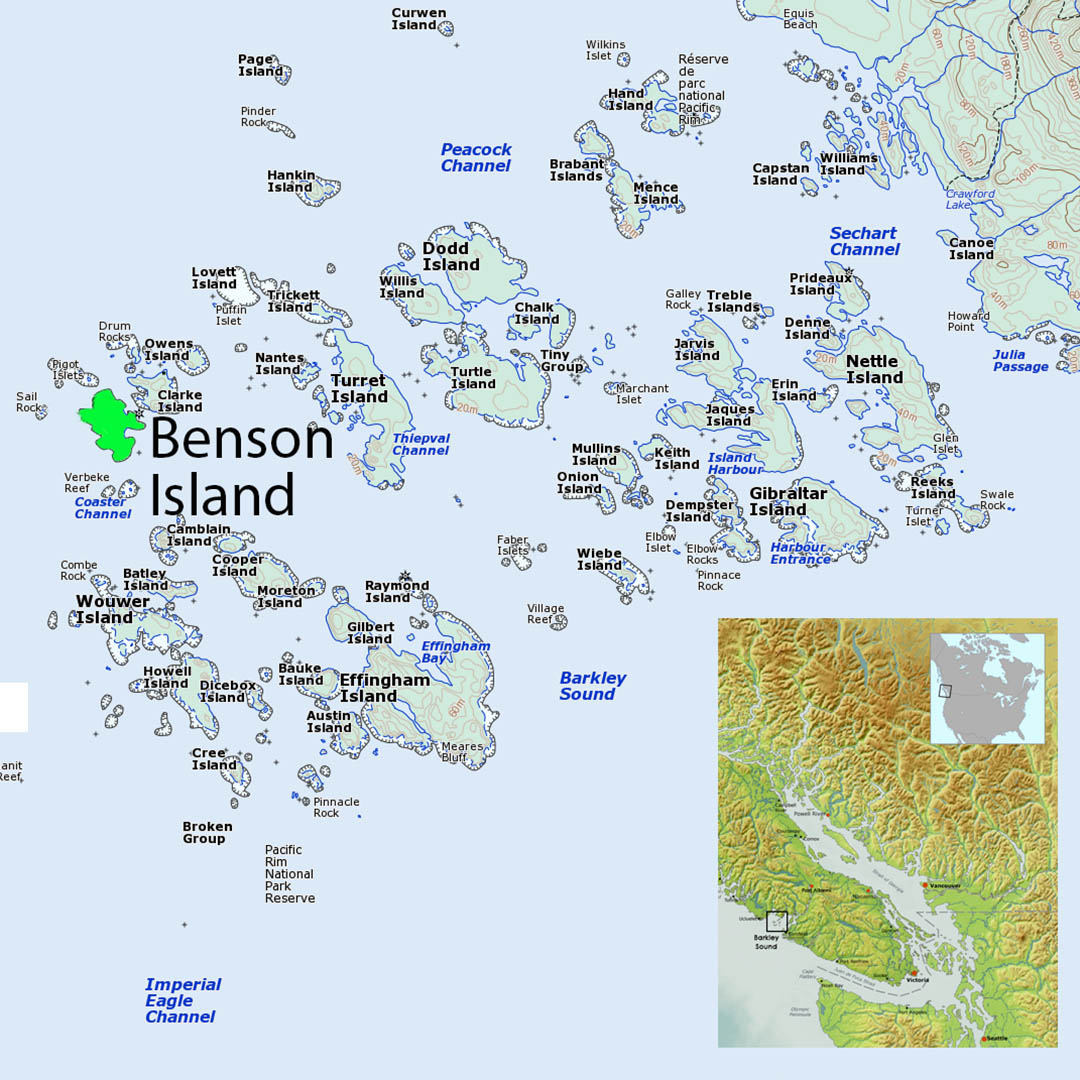
- Benson Island is one of the Broken Group located in Barkley Sound on the west coast of Vancouver Island

- Location in British Columbia Location in Canada

Geography
- Location: Barkley Sound, Vancouver Island, British Columbia
- Coordinates: 48°53′0″N 125°22′56″W
- Archipelago: Barkley Sound
- Area: 17.4 ha (43 acres)

Administration
- Canada
- Province: British Columbia
- Region: Vancouver Island

Demographics
- Ethnic groups: Tseshaht First Nation territory

Benson Island, known to the Tseshaht First Nation people as C'isaa (Ćišaa?atḥ) or Ts'ishaa (Ts'isha?atH), is part of the Broken Group in Barkley Sound on the west coast of Vancouver Island, British Columbia, Canada. It is notable because the Tseshaht First Nation recognize it as the creation site where the first man and first woman of the Tseshaht people came into this world.

== Geography ==
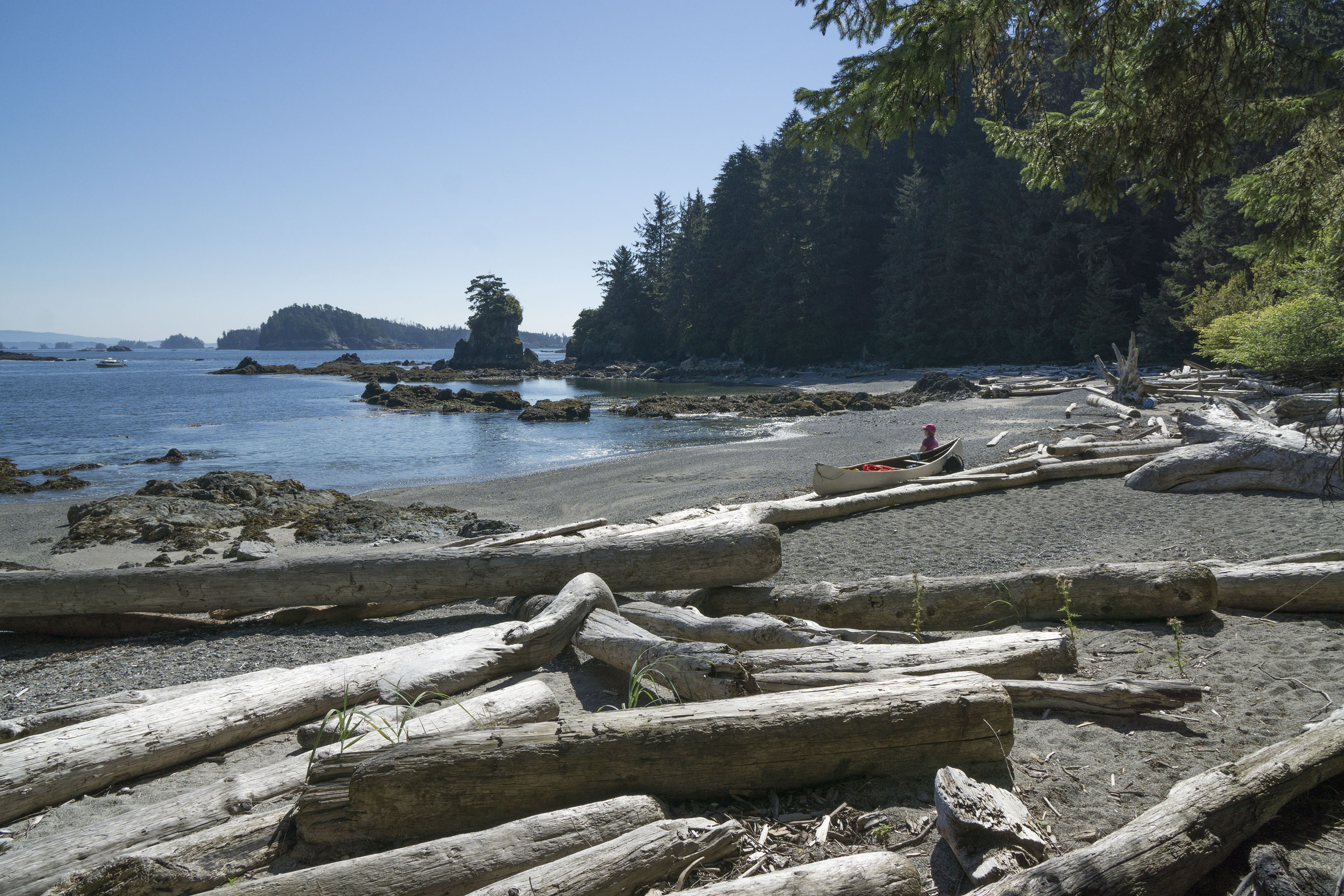
View of the southeastern beach on Benson Island

Benson is a small, irregularly shaped island on the northwestern edge of the Broken Group. It covers about 43 acres (17 ha) and is about .5 miles (0.80 km) at its longest points from north to south. The shoreline is mostly very rugged, with two rock beaches on the northeast and southeast sides of the island. The northeast beach is the site of a former Tseshaht village, and there is a large cultural shell midden extending approximately 985 feet (300 m) along the shoreline. There is a small blowhole on the west side that is active mostly during high tides.

== History ==
=== Tseshaht people ===
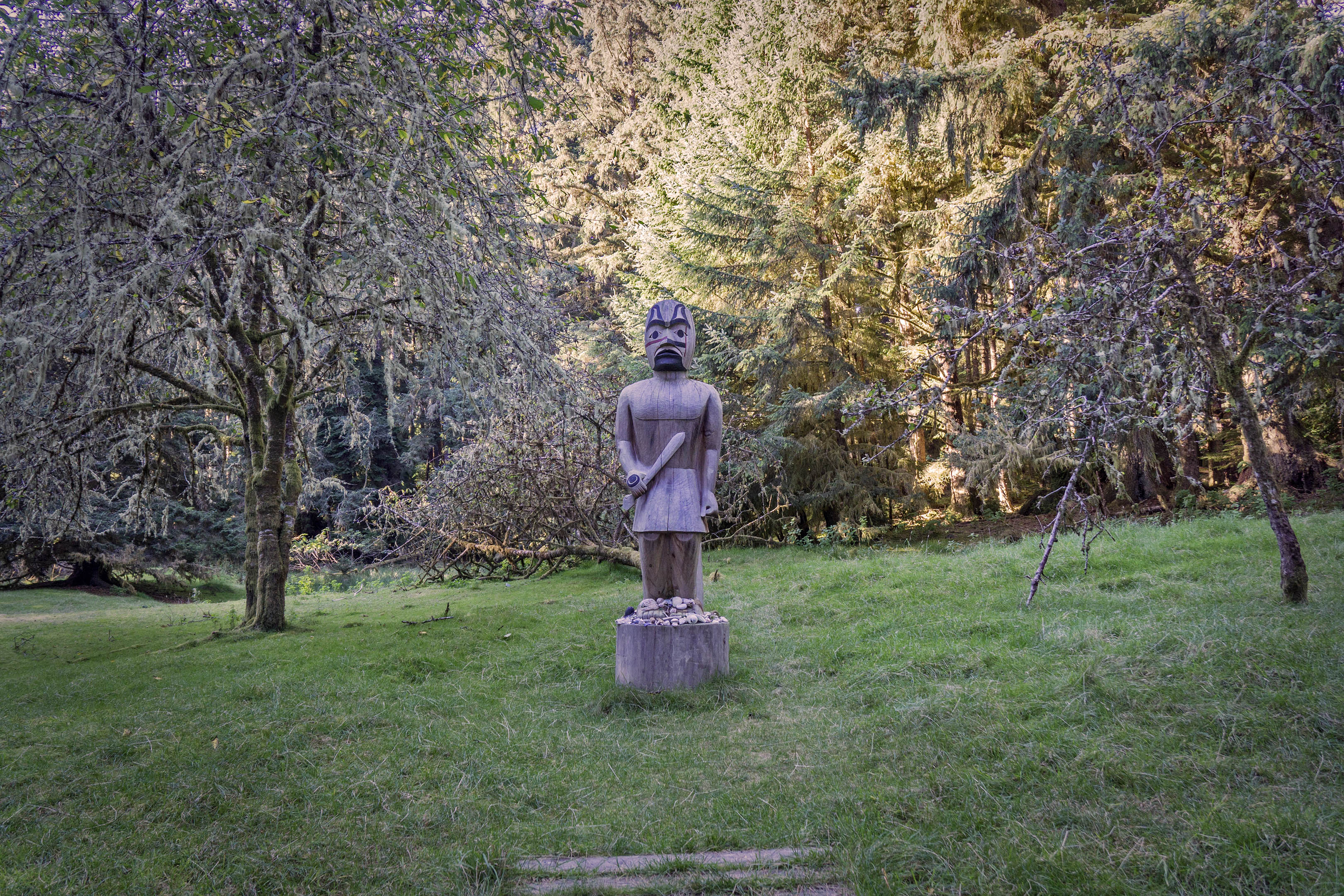
A wood carving of Ch'ichu'atH, recognized by the Tseshaht First Nations as the First Man, at the cultural site on Benson Island, British Columbia, Canada. Carving by Gordon Dick of the Tseshaht First Nation.

The oral history of the Tseshaht people, part of the Nuu-Chah-Nulth culture of western British Columbia, identifies Ts'ishaa (C'isaa) (Benson Island) as the place where Kapkimyis, a supernatural being in their tradition, created the first Tseshaht man and woman. There are several versions of the story about this event. The following is taken from two current versions as told by the Tseshaht people:

- A girl called Nasayilim ("Sky Day") was awakened to see two people ‒ an old man and a shaman. The old man cut his left side, and the shaman collected the blood that flowed from the wound. He blew on it, creating what we call ts'chsy'a'pi, the "life pulse". From this a boy named Naasiya'atu ("Day Down"), also known as Ch'ichu'?atH, was created. The boy and the girl grew up and had many children. Thus many were descended from the two. The Chief in the Sky made an island, high and dry, called Ts'isha' for the people to live. The boy was given a war club with blood along the edge and told to keep it on the beach so the tribe would never die. (Note: This synopsis of the Tseshaht creation story is combined from two slightly different stories, one found on the interpretive signs on Benson Island (see photo accompanying this article) and another found on p138 of Nuu-Chah-Nulth Voices (see references))

The significance of C'isaa (Ts'ishaa) to the Tseshaht people is indicated by their very name: "Tseshaht" means "people of Ts'ishaa".

Archeological evidence shows the site at C'isaa was first occupied over 5,000 years ago, and Tseshaht oral history tells of continuing occupation of the site until after European contact. The Tseshaht people used Ts'ishaa as a home village as they followed sea mammals, salmon and other food and natural resources throughout Barkley Sound as the seasons changed.

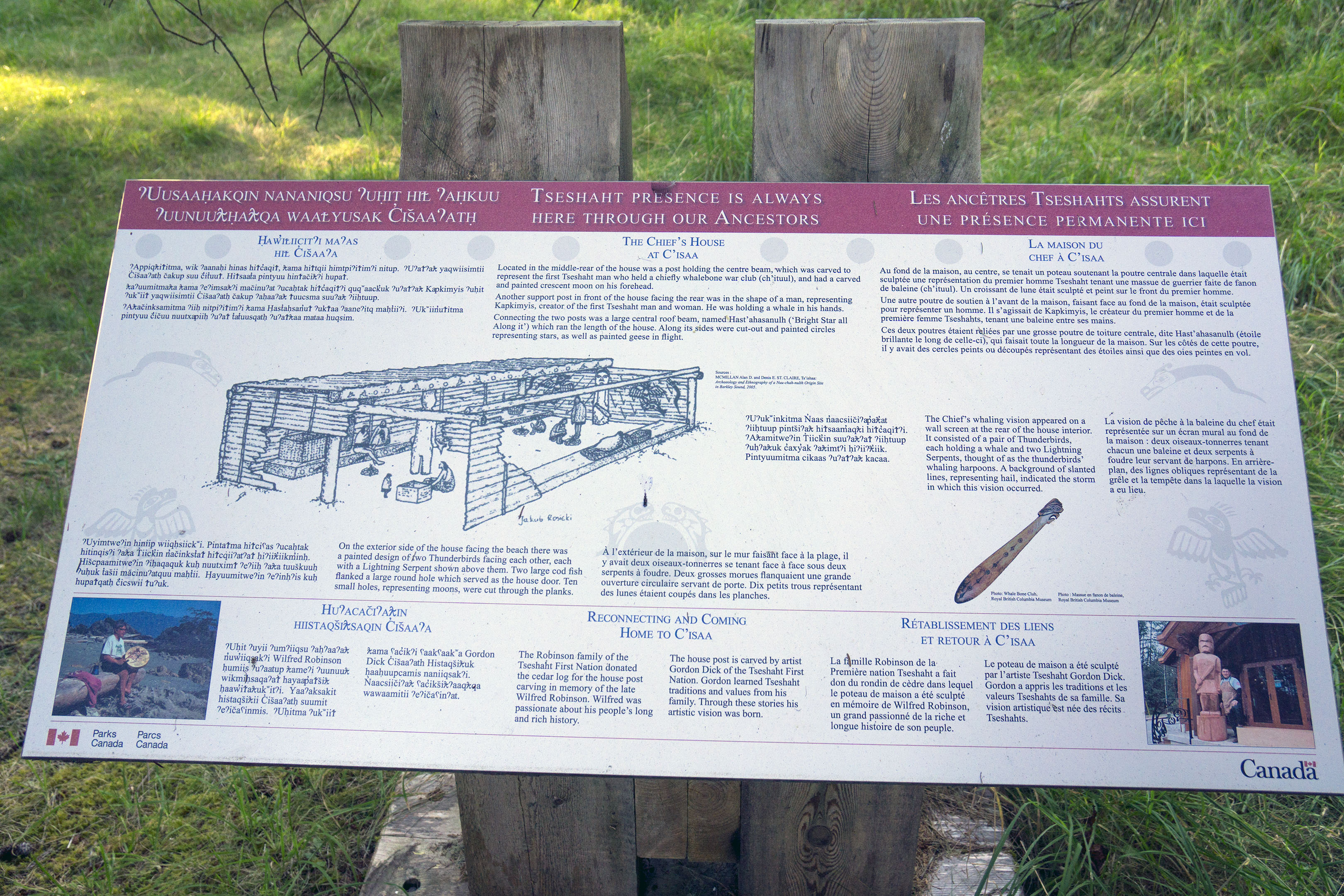
Interpretive sign describing the Tseshaht First Nation cultural site on Benson Island.

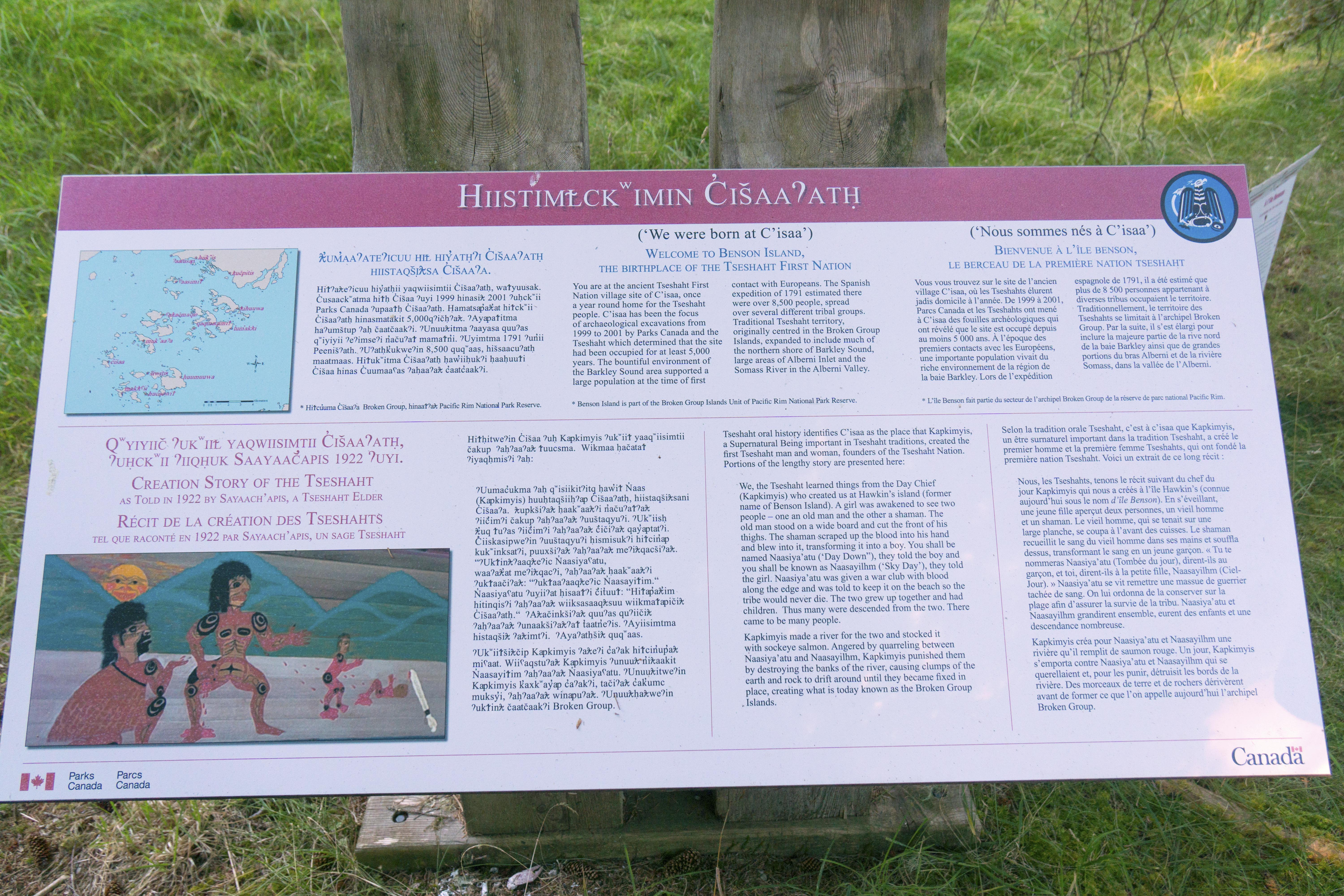
Interpretive sign describing the Tseshaht First Nation cultural site on Benson Island.

=== Post-European Exploration ===
In 1791 the Spanish Ship Santa Saturnina entered Barkley Sound, marking the first European contact with the indigenous people living in the area. Over the next 100 years the Tseshaht and other First Nations in the area suffered enormous population declines, primarily from diseases such as smallpox that were brought by the European explorers.

By 1865 the island was labelled on British Admiralty charts as Hawkins Island. In 1893 John W. Benson purchased the island and proceeded to build a large home on the east side of the island. The home was later expanded into a hotel for visitors. On November 19, 1922 the Victoria Colonist newspaper reported that the island "had a small hotel worth visiting. There were about ten acres cleared and a portion of it was planted in a garden and orchard to supply the hotel. The island and hotel are owned by Mrs. Benson, widow of an old-time sealing captain, and one of the early pioneers of the West Coast of Vancouver Island."

In 1970 most of the Broken Group islands, including Benson, were included in the newly designated Pacific Rim National Park Reserve. The island has been a popular destination for sea kayakers, recreational sailors and other visitors to the area.

In 2009 Parks Canada and the Tseshaht First Nation reached an agreement to prohibit all camping on the island due to its cultural significance. An interpretive display about the importance of the island was installed in 2012. It includes a tall wooden house standing post carved by Tseshaht artist Gordon Dick. Day trips are still permitted so that visitors may learn about the Tseshaht history.

== External sources ==
https://web.archive.org/web/20140924042034/http://www.pacificrimpark.com/

http://www.vancouverisland.com/plan-your-trip/regions-and-towns/vancouver-island-bc-islands/broken-group-islands/
