= Alberni Valley Heritage Network =

The Alberni Valley Heritage Network in Port Alberni, British Columbia consists of the Alberni Valley Museum (First Nations culture, local and industrial history and folk art), the McLean Mill National Historic Site (a historic steam-operated sawmill), the Alberni Pacific Railway (a steam-powered heritage railway), and the Maritime Discovery Centre.
