= Broken Group =

Group of small Canadian islands

Coordinates: 48°54′00″N 125°20′00″W

The Broken Group is a group of small islands and islets in the middle of Barkley Sound on the West Coast of Vancouver Island, British Columbia, Canada. It is protected as the Broken Islands Group Unit of the Pacific Rim National Park Reserve, which includes Long Beach, between Ucluelet and Tofino to Barkley Sound's northwest, and the West Coast Trail between Port Renfrew and Bamfield, to the southeast. The group, which lies between Imperial Eagle and Loudon Channels, includes the Brabant Islands and Hand Island, but not Pinkerton Islands. The southernmost of the group is Cree Island; the easternmost is Reeks Island. Benson Island, on the northwest corner of the Broken Group, is an important cultural site for the Tseshaht First Nation.
