= McLean Mill National Historic Site =

Coordinates: 49.3108°N 124.8272°W

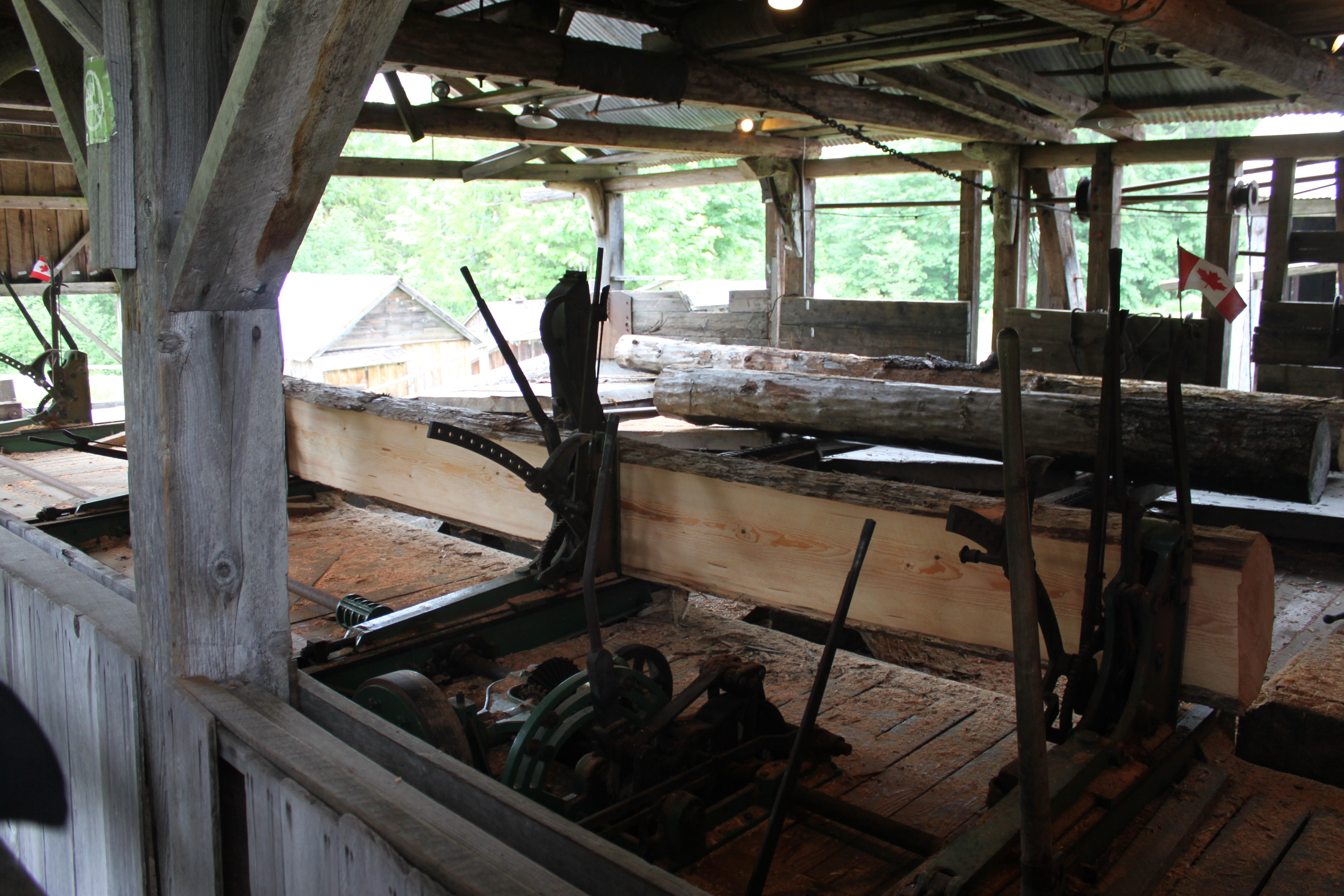
- An interior shot of the McLean Mill
- Interactive map of McLean Mill National Historic Site
- Type: steam-operated sawmill
- Location: Vancouver Island, British Columbia, Canada

History
- Built: 1926

Site notes
- Governing body: City of Port Alberni
- Website: Alberni Valley Heritage Network

National Historic Site of Canada

McLean Mill National Historic Site is a steam-operated sawmill on Vancouver Island, officially open to tourists since July 1, 2000. It was designated a National Historic Site of Canada in 1989.

== History ==
The mill originally ran as a family operated saw-milling business from 1926 to 1965. The original plot of land was purchased by Robert Bartlett ("R.B.") McLean. McLean moved there with his wife, Cora, and three sons, Arnold, Philip, and Walter.

The business was eventually taken over by Arnold, who then passed the business to his son Howard McLean, who ran it until its closing in 1965. One of the main reasons for its closing was competition from the larger lumber companies in the area.

== See also ==
- Alberni Valley Heritage Network
