= Tseshaht First Nation =

Nuu-chah-nulth band government in British Columbia, Canada

Tseshaht First Nation Band No. 665 c̓išaaʔatḥ
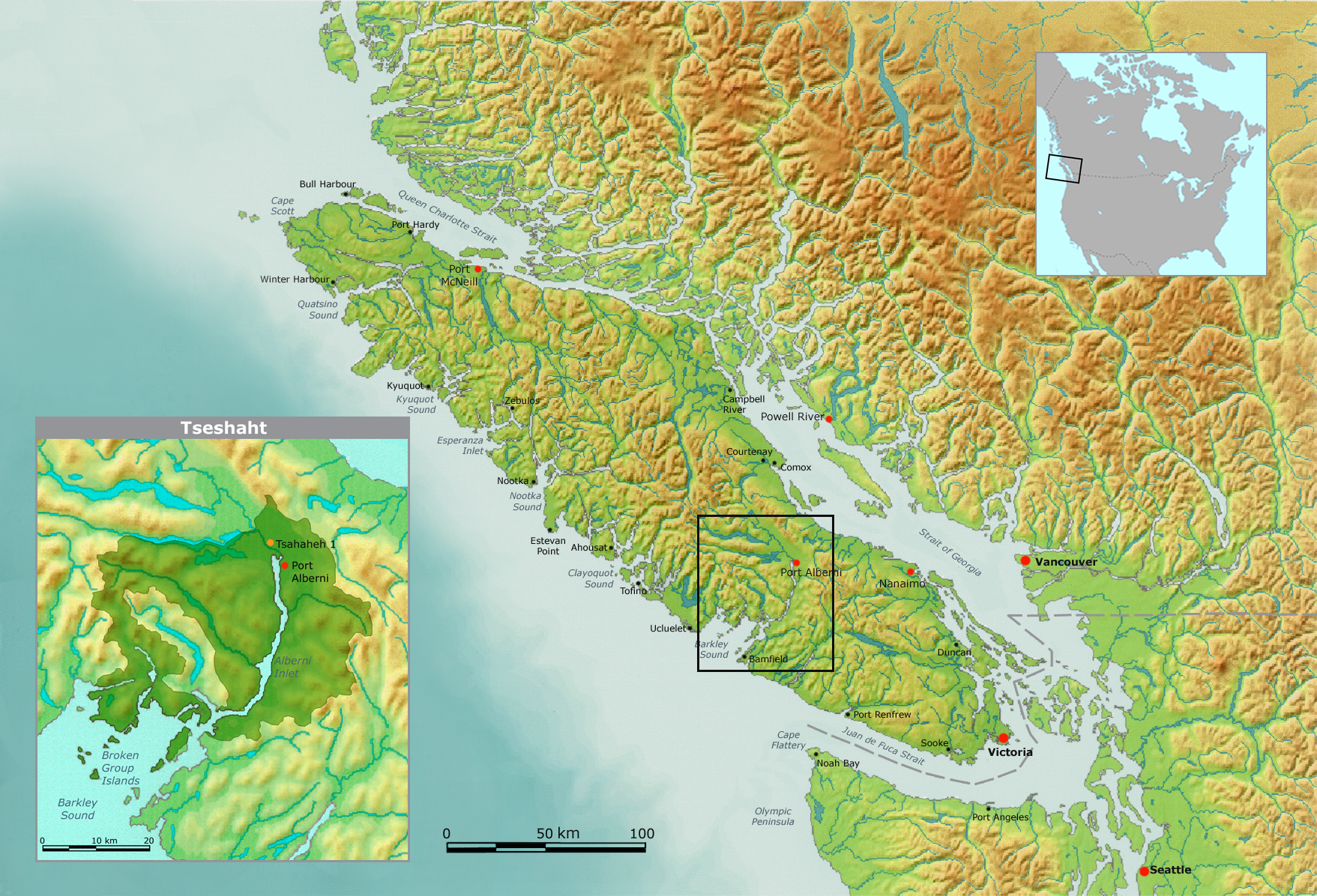
- People: Nuu-chah-nulth
- Province: British Columbia

Population (2021)
- On reserve: 452
- On other land: 40
- Off reserve: 755
- Total population: 1247

Government
- Chief: Ken Watts (waamiiš)
- Council: Debra Foxcroft; Jennifer Gallic; Leisa Hassall; Eunice Joe; Natasha Marshall; Ed Ross; Les Sam

Tribal Council
- Nuu-chah-nulth Tribal Council

Website
- https://tseshaht.com/

Tseshaht First Nation is an amalgamation of many tribes up and down Alberni Inlet and in the Alberni Valley of central Vancouver Island in the Canadian province of British Columbia. They are a member of the Nuu-chah-nulth Tribal Council which includes all other Nuu-chah-nulth-aht peoples except the Pacheedaht First Nation.

== Population ==
There are 1,205 Tseshaht. The main reserve community is located in Port Alberni, British Columbia. They became the area's dominant tribe through historical warfare. The Tseshaht First nation is one of 14 that make up the Nuu-chah-nulth culture. Their language is a member of the Wakashan family.

== Creation story ==
Tseshaht oral history tells that their people were first created on Benson Island, British Columbia. In 2012, an interpretive display about the importance of the island was installed in cooperation with Parks Canada. The site is marked by a tall wooden carving by Tseshaht artist Gordon Dick.

== Notable people ==
- Alec Thomas born around 1894 near Alberni. He was a fisherman, trapper, longshoreman, logger, interpreter, and Tseshaht politician.
- Tom Sayachapis born circa 1838–1843. He was a prolific whaler and woodworker. Between 1913 and 1922, he was also one of the primary informants to Anthropologist/Linguist Edward Sapir for his extensive notes (known as the Sapir-Thomas Nootka texts) that were intended to provide an extensive ethnography on the cultural and social life of the Nuu Chah Nulth (Nootka) people. Tom Sayachapis died circa 1922.
- George Clutesi CM (1905–1988) actor, artist and writer

== See also ==
- Port Alberni
- Alberni Inlet
- Nuu-chah-nulth
- Nuu-chah-nulth language
