= Prairie bundleflower =

Prairie bundleflower is a common name for several plants and may refer to:

- Desmanthus illinoensis
- Desmanthus leptolobus, native to North America
