= Prairie mimosa =

Prairie mimosa is a common name for several plants and it may refer to:

- Desmanthus illinoensis
- Desmanthus leptolobus
