= Sombrio Beach =

Beach in British Columbia, Canada

- Beach
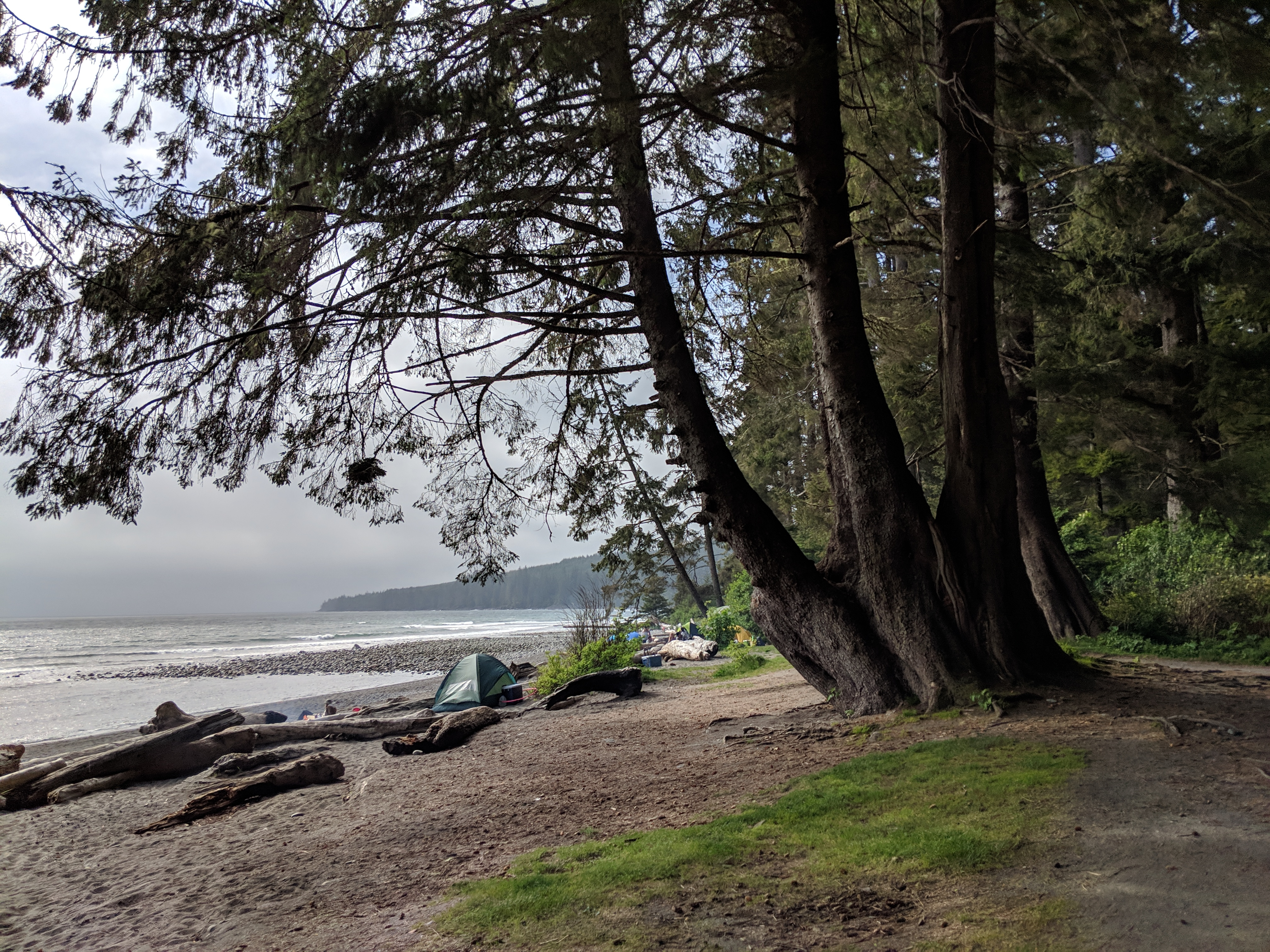
- Beach camping at Sombrio

- Location within Capital Regional District Location within British Columbia
- Coordinates: 48.4994°N 124.3009°W
- Location: Capital Regional District, British Columbia, Canada
- Water bodies: Strait of Juan de Fuca
- Surface elevation: 0 m (0 ft)
- Topo map: NTS 92C8 River Jordan

Sombrio Beach is a beach in the western Capital Regional District, British Columbia, Canada, southeast of the settlement of Port Renfrew. It is on the southwest coast of Vancouver Island on the Strait of Juan de Fuca, west of Sombrio Point, and astride the mouth of the Sombrio River. The beach is partly within Juan de Fuca Provincial Park and is traversed by the Juan de Fuca Marine Trail. It is on the traditional territory of the Pacheedaht Nation, and it was the site of a fishing and harvesting village called Qwa:qtłis.

== Recreation ==
The beach can be accessed from British Columbia Highway 14 via the Sombrio Beach Trailhead, where there are parking and restroom facilities. There are three cutoff points to the beach from the Juan de Fuca Marine Trail: Sombrio Beach (East) at kilometre 28.0; Sombrio Beach (West) at kilometre 29.6; and Sombrio Beach (West-west) at kilometre 30.2. There is a camping site at East Sombrio Beach with restroom facilities.

== See also ==
- China Beach (British Columbia)
- Jordan River, British Columbia
