= Juan de Fuca (disambiguation) =

Juan de Fuca was a Greek maritime explorer.

Juan de Fuca may also refer to:

- Strait of Juan de Fuca, a strait separating Vancouver Island from the Olympic Peninsula
- Juan de Fuca Plate, a tectonic plate
- Juan de Fuca Ridge, a tectonic spreading center located off the coasts of the state of Washington
- Juan de Fuca (provincial electoral district), a provincial electoral district in British Columbia, Canada
- Juan de Fuca Electoral Area, a local government subdivision in British Columbia
- Juan de Fuca Marine Trail, a backpacking trail in British Columbia
- Juan de Fuca Provincial Park, a provincial park in British Columbia
- Juan de Fuca Plate (soccer), an annual British Columbian soccer trophy
- SS Juan de Fuca, a WWII liberty ship laid down in 1942. Later entered US Navy service as the USS Araner (IX-226) in 1945.
