= China Beach (disambiguation) =

China Beach is an American dramatic television series.

China Beach may also refer to:

- China Beach (British Columbia), a beach on Vancouver Island, British Columbia
- China Beach, San Francisco, a small cove in San Francisco
- My Khe Beach, Da Nang, nicknamed China Beach by American soldiers
- New Brighton State Beach or China Beach, a California cove

== See also ==
- Yakomo Beach, China, Kagoshima, Japan
- Category:Beaches of China
