= Winifred B. Chase =

American university professor, botanist and collector (1877–1949)

Ethel Winifred Bennett Chase
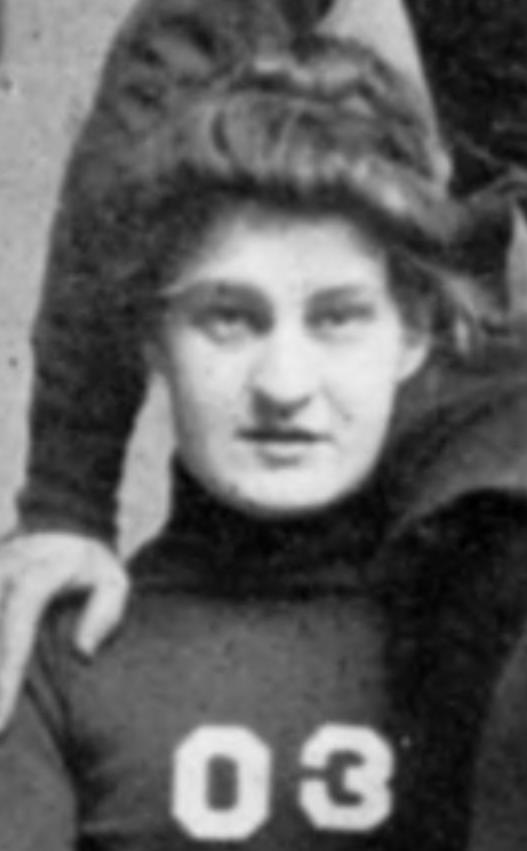
- Born: Ethel Winifred Bennett Chase; December 19, 1877; La Porte, Indiana, US
- Died: August 26, 1949 (aged 71); Novi, Michigan, US
- Other name: Winifred B. Chase
- Occupations: University professor, teacher, botanist and botanical collector

Ethel Winifred Bennett Chase (19 December 1877 – 26 August 1949) was an American botanist, a professor of botany and the dean of women at what is now Wayne State University. Chase was a member of a South Pacific botanical expedition led by Josephine E. Tilden in 1909–1910 and collected scientifically significant botanical specimens during that expedition. She was an active member of both Delta Delta Delta and the P.E.O Sisterhood and served in various administrative positions with both organisations.

== Early life and education ==
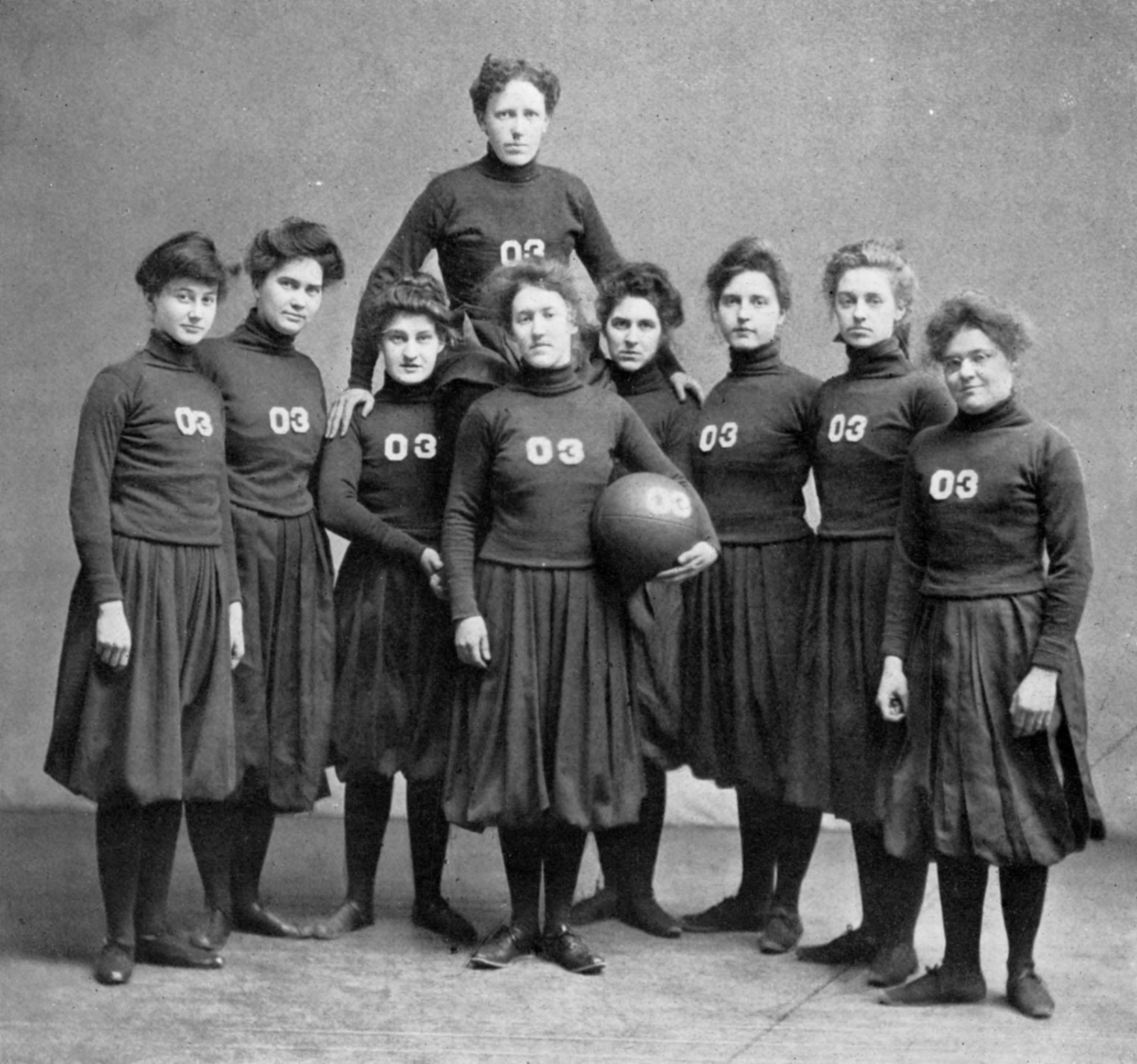
University of Michigan 1903 Women's Basketball Team, Chase is third from the left.

Chase was born in La Porte on 19 December 1877 to Helen McCormick and Henry Augustus Chase. As a result of her mother dying while Chase was still a toddler, she was brought up by her maternal grandparents in La Porte. She subsequently attended La Porte High School. In her senior year at high school, in 1894, Chase's grandfather died as did her grandmother several years later. As a result, Chase began her university education in 1899 when, aged 22, she entered the University of Michigan. In 1901 to 1902 Chase was employed at Stetson University as an assistant botanist and instructor in physical education but returned to the University of Michigan to complete her Bachelor of Arts degree in 1903. During that year she was a member of the University of Michigan's women's basketball team. It was also in 1903 that Chase assisted Harriet Waterbury Thomson with an ecological survey of Huron River. Thomson would go on to become a professor at the University of Oregon.

Chase would return to the University of Michigan to obtain a Master of Arts in 1915.

== Employment ==
For the 10 years after her graduation she taught at the Delray McMillian High School in what was then the town of Delray. In around 1905 Chase met a fellow teacher, Bernice Leland, who would become her lifelong friend and with whom she would travel and botanise. From 1913 to 1915 Chase taught at the Central High School. From 1915 until her retirement in 1947 Chase taught at institutions that would evolve into the Wayne State University. Archives relating to Chase's work at Wayne State University are held at that University's library. The Bentley Historical Library of the University of Michigan also holds some of Chase's correspondence with Frieda Cobb Blanchard as well as a photograph album created by Chase.

== South Pacific expedition ==
In 1909 Tilden invited Chase and Leland to accompany her, her mother and her aunt on a botanising trip to the South Pacific. The women began their expedition in late 1909 from San Francisco, travelling on the ship Mariposa to Auckland, New Zealand. The party then proceeded to gather herbarium specimens down the length of New Zealand from Auckland to Stewart Island. The women then left New Zealand to visit and botanise on the islands of Rarotonga and Tahiti, with Tilden and her family remaining in Tahiti and Chase and Leland returning to Detroit to take up their respective teaching duties. The party collected numerous specimens, many of which continue to inform science to this day.

During the expedition Chase and Leland created a collection of lantern slides that include images of the New Zealand landscape, the Māori people, as well as the expected images of plants. These lantern slides are in the collection of the Bentley Historical Library at the University of Michigan as part of the UM Herbarium's collection.

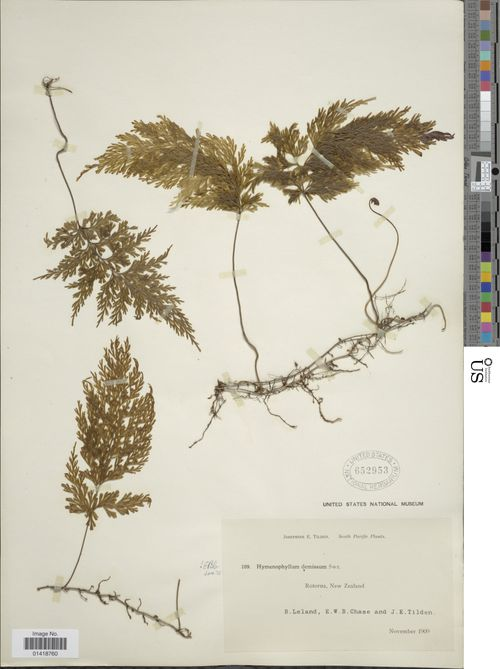
Hymenophyllum demissum collected in Rotarua, New Zealand by Chase, Leland and Tilden

== Other botanical field trips ==
Chase regularly spent her summers botanising, often at various biological stations. She botanised in the Marine Biological Laboratory, the Mountain Lake Biological Station in Virginia, at the Friday Harbor Laboratories and at the Minnesota Seaside Station at Vancouver Island in Canada. It was at this latter biological station that she met Professor Josephine Tilden. Chase also spent a season botanising at Raymond, Maine.

Chase spent a month on Grand Manan Island in 1938 collecting specimens with a view to investigating plant associations. Unfortunately this work was never completed by Chase and the fellowship established in her name at the University of Michigan was in some part inspired in order to encourage the completion of this work.

== Delta Kappa Gamma, Delta Delta Delta and P.E.O. Sisterhood membership ==
Chase belonged to the Iota Chapter of Delta Delta Delta as well as to Chapter A, Michigan of the P.E.O. Sisterhood. She was active in the administration of both organisations, and served as the National Alliance Officer for Delta Delta Delta from 1919 to 1925, historian for that organisation from 1925 to 1928 and chairperson of the Delta Delta Delta Fiftieth Anniversary Fund from 1929 to 1936. She was instrumental in organising that the funds raised be used for fellowships for Delta Delta Delta members engaged in furthering their education.

Chase was also a member of Delta Kappa Gamma.

== Death and the Winifred B. Chase Fellowship fund ==
Chase died at the Northville Convalescence Home in Novi on 26 August 1949. In 1955 Bernice Leland donated $2000 to establish the Winifred B. Chase Fellowship Award at the University of Michigan. The University awards the Winifred B. Chase Fellowship yearly to support botanical research.
