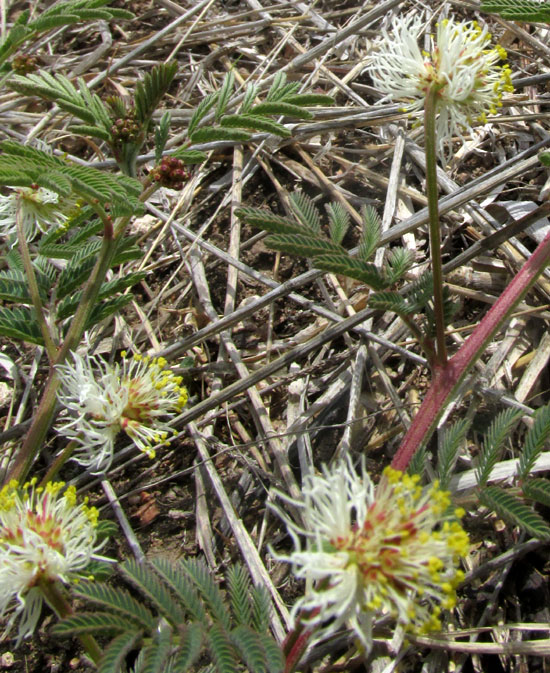
- Desmanthus painteri flowering, leafy branches

Scientific classification
- Kingdom: Plantae
- Clade: Tracheophytes
- Clade: Angiosperms
- Clade: Eudicots
- Clade: Rosids
- Order: Fabales
- Family: Fabaceae
- Subfamily: Caesalpinioideae
- Clade: Mimosoid clade
- Genus: Desmanthus
- Species: D. painteri

Binomial name
- Desmanthus painteri (Britton & Rose) Standl.

Synonyms
- Acuan painteri Britton & Rose; Acuan arsenei Britton & Rose; Desmanthus arsenei (Britton & Rose) Standl.

= Desmanthus painteri =

Species of plant

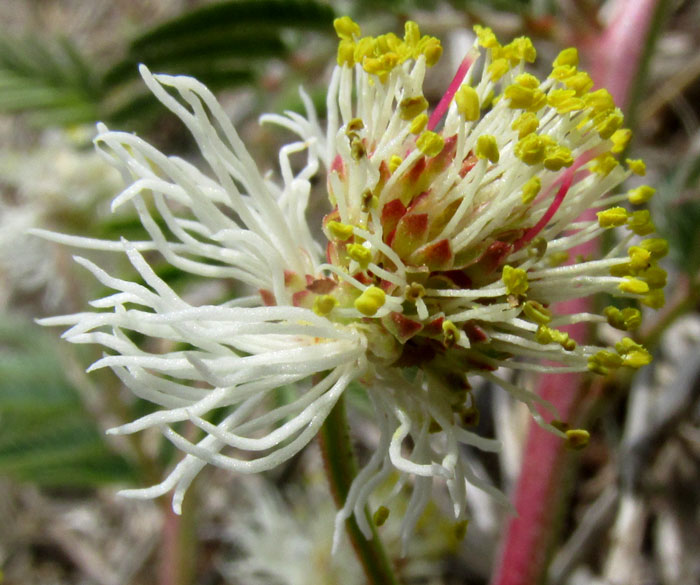
Flowering head, filaments without anthers on the left, with anthers and pink styles on the right

Desmanthus painteri, with no common English name other than bundleflower, which is shared with all other species of Desmanthus, is a herbaceous plant native to Mexico. It belongs to the family Fabaceae.

== Description ==
Desmanthus painteri is a perennial with branches close to the ground spreading in all directions from a long, strong, woody root. Here are other noteworthy features:

- Ground-hugging, spineless stems are much branched from the base, up to 1 m (3 ft 3 in) long, tending to be reddish in parts, and with squared corners in cross-section.
- Leaves have petioles up to 4 mm (1/8 in) long. Blades are twice-divided, the first division with up to 7 pairs of pinnae, and the pinnae divided into up to 20 pairs of pinnules, or leaflets, up to 5 mm (1/4 in) long and about 1 mm (1/16 in) wide. There's a round to oblong gland on the rachis between the lowest pair of pinnae.
- Inflorescences consist of solitary, more or less spherical heads containing up to 40 flowers and up to 10 mm (1/2 in) in diameter. They stand atop peduncles up to 50 mm (2 in) tall arising along the stems' lengths.
- Flowers have small sepals and petals but the main visible part of the flowering head mainly consists of the stamens' white filaments, of which there are 10 per flower. Filaments in one part of the head may bear no anthers, so only white the filaments are seen, while flowers in the head's other part bear filaments tipped with yellow, pollen-producing anthers.
- Fruits are legume-type capsules in clusters of 1-17 per fruiting head. The capsules are up to 5.5 cm (2 1/4 in) long and 5.5 mm (1/4 in) wide and develop sharp tips at their ends up to 4 mm (3/16 in) long. Up to 15 flattened, egg-shaped seeds about 3 mm (1/8 in) long are produced in each fruit.

== Distribution ==
Desmanthus painteri is endemic just to Mexico, where it occurs from the northern states of Chihuahua, Coahuila and Nuevo Leon, south through the central highlands to the states of Puebla and Oaxaca.

== Habitat ==
In central Mexico Desmanthus painteri tends to occupy disturbed environments. Images on this page show a plant in a grossly overgrazed field in thin, much eroded soil at an elevation of about 1,900m (6200 ft).

== Taxonomy ==
Desmanthus painteri was first formally described and published in 1928 by Nathaniel Lord Britton and Joseph Nelson Rose, under the name Acuan painteri. The type specimen known as Rose, Painter & Rose 9810 was collected on August 24, 1905 between Higuarillas and San Pablo, Querétaro, México.

== Etymology ==
The genus name Desmanthus is based on the Greek word desmos, meaning "bundle," and anthos, meaning "flower."

The species name painteri almost certainly honors Joseph H. Painter, a promising young botanist at the United States National Herbarium from 1904 to 1908. The type specimen of Desmanthus painteri is Rose, Painter & Rose 9810, with one of the collector Roses being Joseph Nelson Rose, who with Nathaniel Lord Britton named the species. In 1908 Painter drowned swimming in the Potomac River.

== Gallery ==
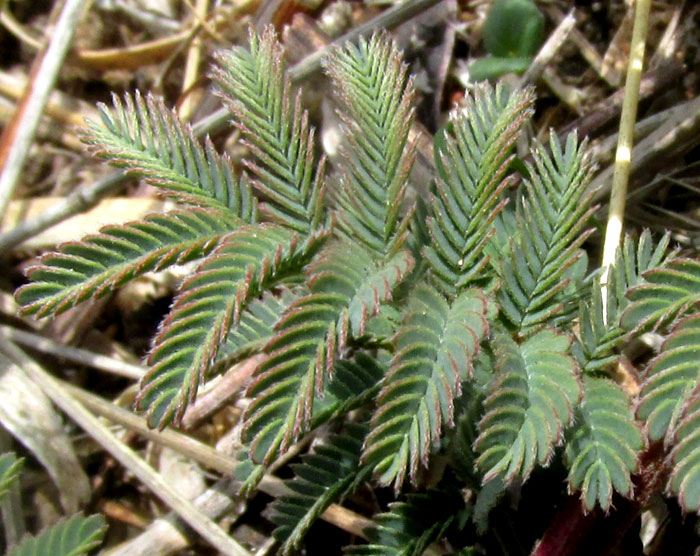
Twice-compound leaf

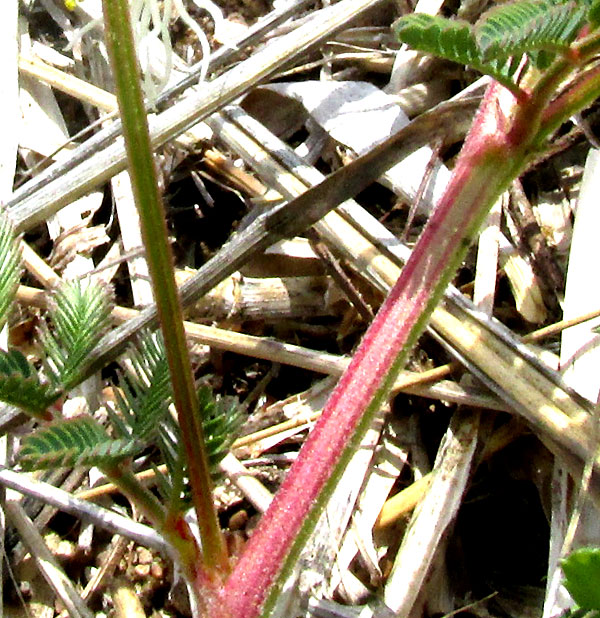
Stem with squared corners

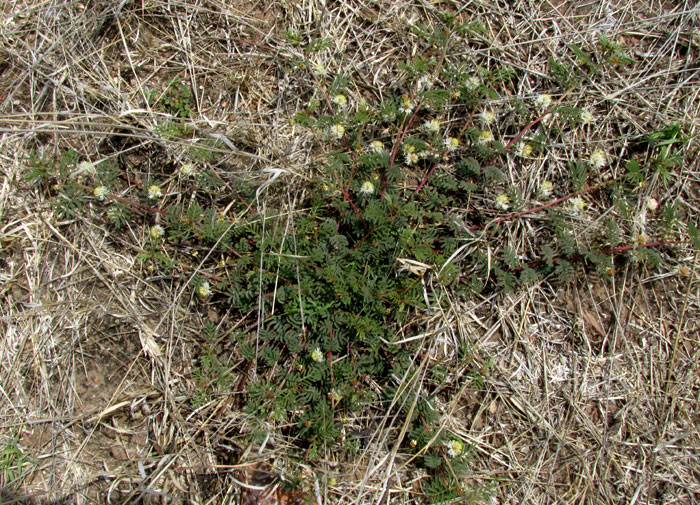
In habitat
