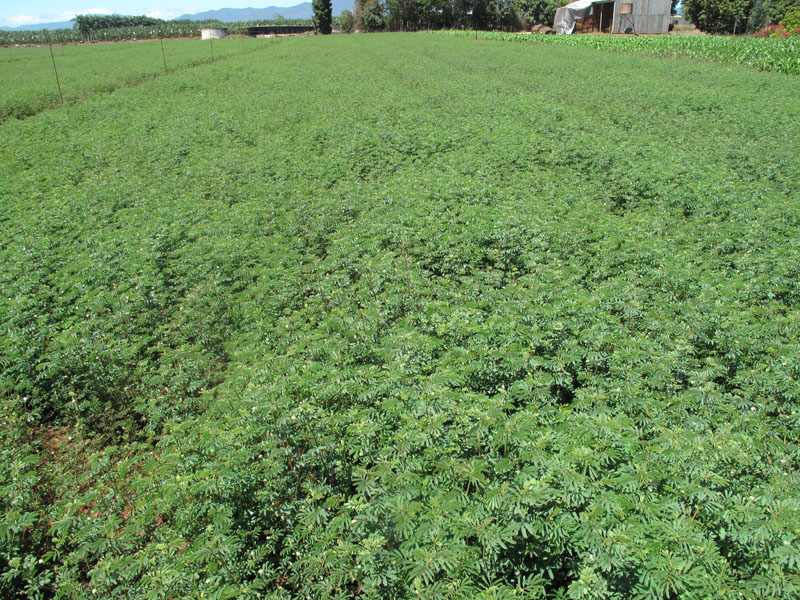
- Cultivated

Conservation status
- Least Concern (IUCN 3.1)

- Secure (NatureServe)

Scientific classification
- Kingdom: Plantae
- Clade: Tracheophytes
- Clade: Angiosperms
- Clade: Eudicots
- Clade: Rosids
- Order: Fabales
- Family: Fabaceae
- Subfamily: Caesalpinioideae
- Clade: Mimosoid clade
- Genus: Desmanthus
- Species: D. virgatus

Binomial name
- Desmanthus virgatus (L.) Willd.

Synonyms
- Acacia angustisiliqua Acacia virgata Acuan depressa Acuan depressum Acuan texanum Acuan tracyi Acuan virgatum Desmanthus depressus Desmanthus pratorum Desmanthus strictus Desmanthus tenellus Mimosa angustisiliqua Mimosa depressa Mimosa virgata L.

= Desmanthus virgatus =

Species of legume

Desmanthus virgatus is a species of flowering plant in the legume family that is known by many common names, including wild tantan, prostrate bundleflower, dwarf koa, desmanto, acacia courant, acacia savane, pompon blank, adormidera, brusca prieta, frijolillo, ground tamarind, guajillo, guashillo, huarangillo, langalet, petit acacia, petit cassie, petit mimosa, virgate mimosa, and slender mimosa, as well as simply desmanthus. It is native to the American tropics and subtropics but is present elsewhere as an introduced species. In some areas it is cultivated as a fodder and forage crop.

== Description ==
This plant is a woody perennial herb or shrub growing up to 1.5, 2, or even 3 meters tall. Its herbage dies back to the woody taproot during dry conditions and sprouts up again when adequate moisture is available. One plant can grow up to 50 stems, becoming quite robust. The older stems are brown to red in color and are shiny and hairless. The leaves are bipinnate, divided into a few pairs of leaflets which are each subdivided into smaller leaflets that measure up to 7 to 9 millimeters long. The inflorescence is a head of up to 11 to 22 flowers. The plant bears perfect, male, and sterile flowers. The flowers are white to yellowish. A short stalk bears up to 11 legume fruit pods which are linear in shape, dark red to blackish in color, and up to 8.5 or 9 centimeters long. They dehisce along each edge to release up to 26 to 30 seeds each. Flowers and fruits are produced year-round in tropical locales with enough water. Outside the tropics it reproduces mainly in spring and summer.

== Habitat and range ==
This plant grows in open habitat types. It easily colonizes disturbed habitat such as roadsides and quarries. It grows in clay and sandy soil types. It is most common at lower altitudes. Its habit of dying back to the root crown helps it to withstand drought, frost, fire, and grazing. It resprouts when conditions are less harsh. It cannot tolerate shade, however, and it does not thrive under a tree canopy.

This species is native to the southern United States, parts of Mexico, Central America, South America, and the Caribbean and has been introduced outside its native range purposely and accidentally. In the United States it is considered to be native to Texas, but it also grows in Florida, where it may or may not be native. It was first reported in Louisiana in 2011 when it was discovered sprouting in a vacant lot in Shreveport. It is naturalized in several African countries, such as Senegal, Zambia, and South Africa, as well as Pacific Islands such as New Caledonia and Hawaii, plus Indonesia, the Philippines, India, and Australia. It is considered to be a weed in many places.

== Uses ==
Prostrate bundleflower is palatable to livestock and non-toxic, and it contains ample protein. It has been found to put weight on cows. While it makes a good food plant for cattle, it is not as promising a feed for pigs. The plant appears to help control erosion and fixes nitrogen, improving the soil. It may be cut for fodder or grown in a field, as it is very tolerant of grazing. The action of grazing animals actually stimulates the plant and more seedlings survive under the pressure of grazing. Livestock, such as sheep, help disperse the plant's seeds throughout the rangeland, as they survive passage through the gut. Several cultivars have been commercially released, including 'Marc' and 'Balli Germplasm'.

== Classification ==
Desmanthus virgata is sometimes considered to be a species complex that includes Desmanthus acuminatus, D. paspalaceus, and D. tatuhyensis. Until recently, many authors grouped several other Desmanthus under the circumscription of D. virgata, including D. pubescens, D. pernambucanus, D. glandulosus and D. leptophyllus.
