= Jordan River, British Columbia =

Community in British Columbia, Canada

Coordinates: 48°25′19″N 124°3′18″W

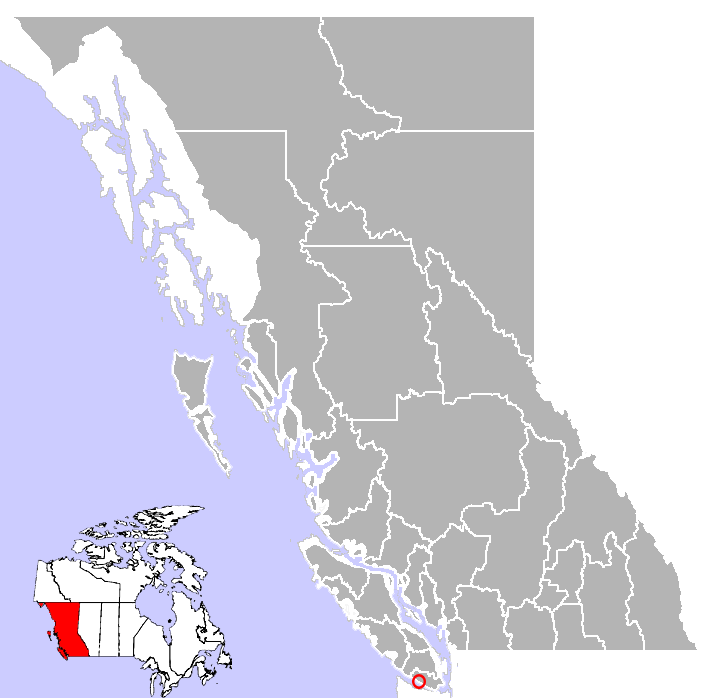
Location of Jordan River in British Columbia along the southwestern side of Vancouver Island

Winter surfing, as seen from the bridge next to Shaky's Burger Shack.

Jordan River, founded as, and still officially gazetted as, River Jordan, is a small settlement on the west coast of Vancouver Island, British Columbia, Canada, approximately 70 kilometres (43 mi) west of Victoria at the mouth of the Jordan River.

Established as a logging camp in the late 19th century, Jordan River has Vancouver Island's second hydroelectric power plant. It is popular amongst winter surfers. The eastern terminus of the Juan de Fuca Trail is at China Beach, 3 kilometres (1.9 mi) west of Jordan River.

== History ==
In 1790, the Spanish navigator and explorer Lieutenant Francisco de Eliza rebuilt a Spanish fort at Nootka Sound and subsequently explored the area between Nootka Sound and present day Victoria, BC. Originally named Rio Hermoso by his Sub-Lieutenant Manuel Quimper on June 14, 1790, the name was changed later that year to Rio Jordan when the Carta Reducida was made by Gonzalo López de Haro. The name change from Rio Hermoso to Rio Jordan is attributed to Francisco de Eliza's chaplain, Alejandro Jordan. Subsequent charting by British explorers anglicized the name to Jordan River.

Logging of the Jordan River watershed dates back to the 1880s. Timber harvesting intensified in 1907 with the construction of 6 kilometres (3.7 mi) of railway tracks. Western Forest Products took over the tree farming operation in 1934 and still manages the area forests today. The railroad has been long abandoned and replaced by log-hauling trucks.

Development of the Jordan River watershed and construction of the hydroelectric plant began in 1911 and finished a few years later. During the construction of the hydroelectric plant, Jordan River was home to 1,000 workers.

Until 1912 Jordan River was only accessible by sea. That year the Old Otter Point Road was extended to Jordan River, connecting the town by land to Sooke and Victoria.

During World War II Jordan River became strategically important to the Royal Canadian Air Force, housing the X-1 Detachment's Low-Flying Early Warning Radar System, called 'Microwave Early Warning/Ground Control Intercept', in anticipation of a Japanese attack on the west coast. Jordan River has a commanding and unobstructed view of the Strait of Juan De Fuca, from Cape Flattery to Port Angeles and thus was ideal for the deployment of the early warning radar system. This same geographical ocean location also makes the town a surfing destination today.

The Old Otter Point Road became part of the newly created Highway 14 in 1953, extending west from Colwood, a suburb of Victoria, to Jordan River. By 1975, Highway 14 was extended all the way west to the remote community of Port Renfrew and paving was completed in the late 1980s.

== Industry ==
=== Hydroelectric dam and power plant ===
Jordan River is the location of Vancouver Island's second hydroelectric generating station. The Vancouver Island Power Company completed construction of the Jordan River hydroelectric system in 1911. Water collects at Diversion Dam, runs 8.8 kilometres (5.5 mi) down a wooden sluice to an equalizing basin and flows through a steel penstock for the last 330 vertical metres (1,083 vertical feet).

From 1912 to 1930, continual improvements and additional generators pushed the capacity of the power plant to 26 megawatts. In 1971 the flume was replaced by a tunnel, connected to a penstock flowing down to a new power house, presently located across the river from the original location. A Japanese built generator replaced the old equipment, boosting power output from 26 megawatts to 175 megawatts.

=== Tree farming ===
Most of the land around Jordan River is managed under a tree farm licence (TFL). Western Forest Products has been in charge of the tree farm licence since 1934, encompassing 32,490 hectares (80,300 acres) between Sooke and Port Renfrew. At the centre of Jordan River, between the bridge and the hydroelectric power house is the raw log sorting facility. Logs are sorted and arranged into rafts at the river's mouth, then towed via sea to Vancouver and Washington State facilities.

The majority of tree farm land has been logged twice in the last 100 years and is currently growing its second generation of replanted trees. Western Forest Products has installed signs along Hwy 14 indicating the growth phases of the forests, such as when a particular tract of land has been logged, replanted, and thinned.

== Geography ==
Nearby communities

- Port Renfrew
- Sooke
- Victoria

Nearby Rivers

- River Jordan
- Loss Creek
- Sombrio River

== See also ==
- List of communities in British Columbia
