= Josephine Tilden =

American phycologist

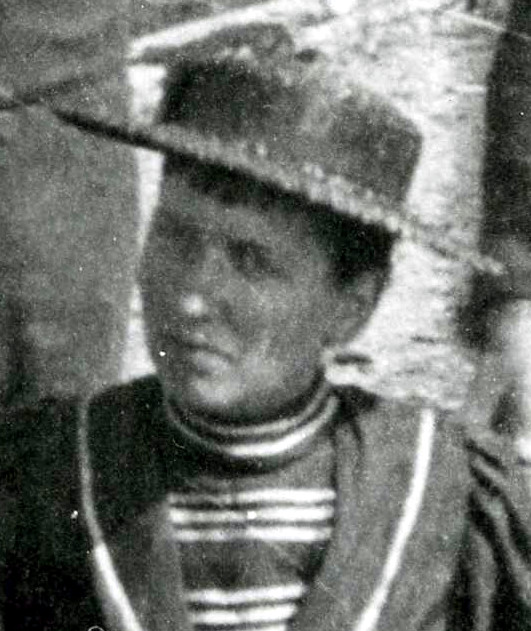
- Tilden as part of a survey team
- Born: Josephine Elizabeth Tilden; March 24, 1869; Davenport, Iowa, US
- Died: May 15, 1957 (aged 88); Florida, US
- Education: University of Minnesota
- Occupations: Researcher and academic
- Employer: University of Minnesota
- Known for: Algology and travel

Josephine Elizabeth Tilden (March 24, 1869 – May 15, 1957) was an American expert on pacific algae. She established a research station in British Columbia, which lasted only until 1906. When Tilden became an assistant professor in 1903, she was the first female scientist employed by the University of Minnesota. In 1910, despite not having a doctorate, she was promoted to full professor.

Tilden traveled widely, particularly around the Pacific Ocean, to collect unusual samples of flora. She also created an important collection of algae which she took from the university and kept in her house for further study after she retired.

== Life ==
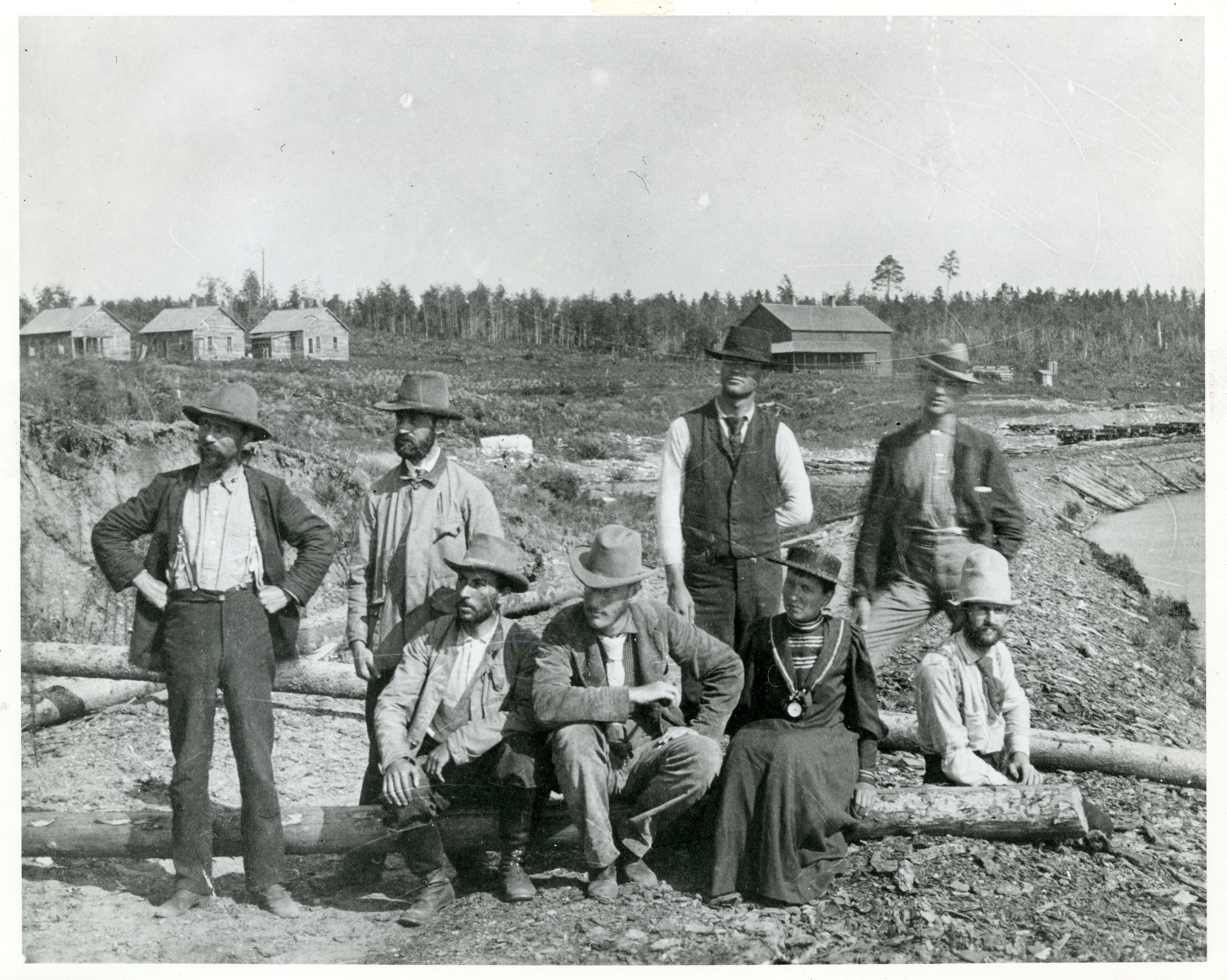
Conway MacMillan sitting by Tilden with colleagues on the Gull Lake Expedition in 1893

Tilden was born in Davenport, Iowa, and grew up in Minneapolis. She showed an early interest in plants, and published a paper on the local botany before she began her association with the University of Minnesota. In 1895, she earned a bachelor's degree, followed by a master's the following year from the university. In 1897 she wrote a paper on algal stalactites, a phenomenon that she had discovered near a geyser in Yellowstone Park.

She became an instructor at her alma mater, as the first female scientist on the staff. She took a peculiar interest in algology. Her superiors at the university were concerned, but they agreed to fund this interest in return for her promise to commit to the subject for at least five years. In fact, Tilden gave a commitment that would last until she died. Her first trip to the Pacific was a journey to Vancouver Island. On many of these journeys she was accompanied by her mother.

Tilden was the leading force of the establishment of the Minnesota Seaside Station in Canada. In 1900, traveling by canoe, she discovered a largely uninhabited stretch of coastline in British Columbia with an abundance of algae and tidal pools. The land owner gave her the area for free, and she chose four acres that were ideal to create an algae research station. The area was known as Botanical Beach in what is now Juan de Fuca Provincial Park in British Columbia. Tilden used her own funds to build the research station. In 1902, Conway MacMillan published a long description of the new station, claiming a benefit of its location was that students had to take an important journey across North America to get there.

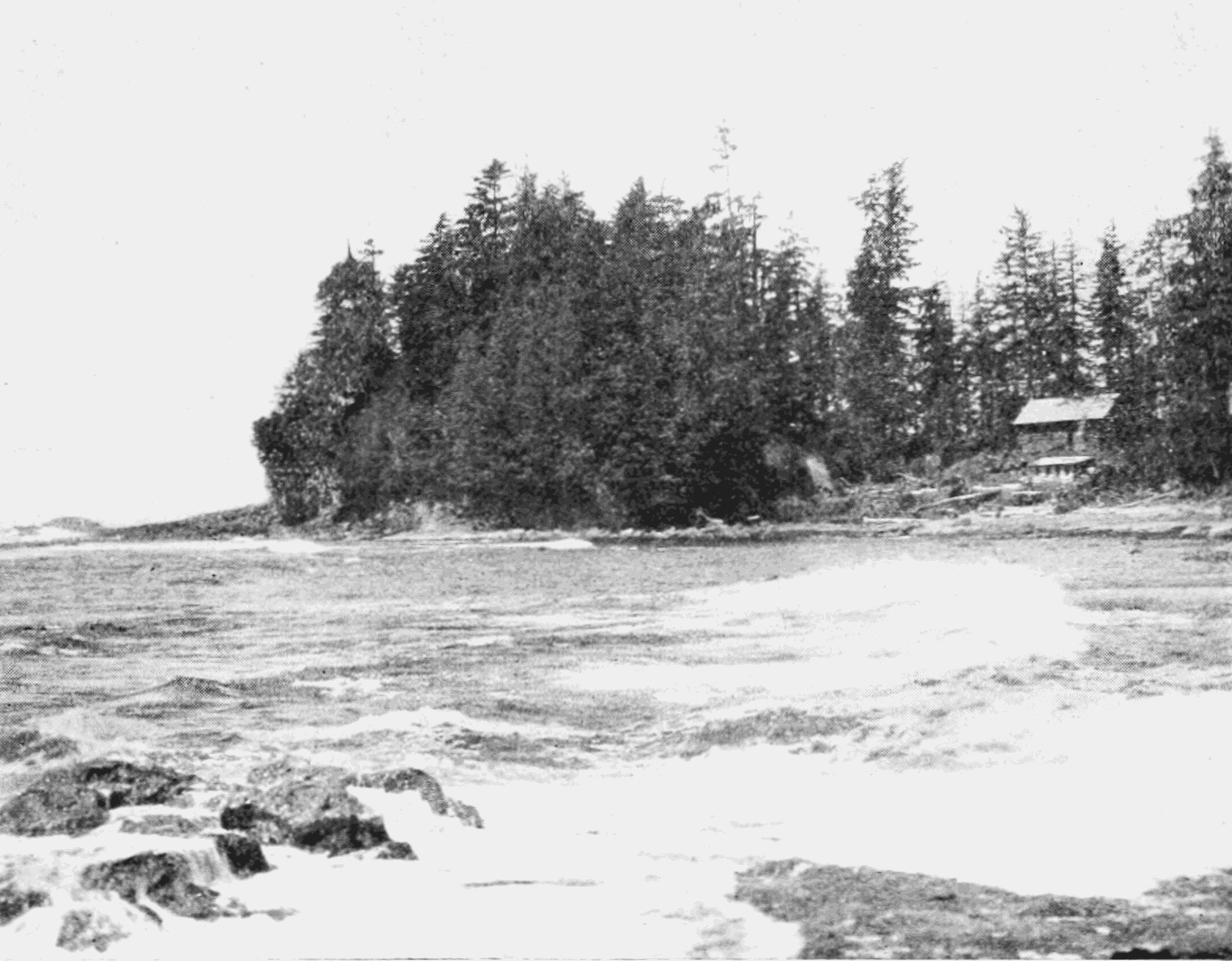
The Seaside Station

Up to 30 professors and students journeyed to the station by train every summer to study geology, algology, zoology, taxonomy, and lichenology, with world-renowned scientists participating in the lecture series. Though students worked long hours, they also enjoyed themselves with hiking trips, evening plays and storytelling, all of which transformed the group of scholars into close-knit colleagues. Letters written by student Alice Misz during the summer of 1906 express that her six-week stay at the station was an unforgettable experience.

After purchase, Tilden in turn offered the land and the buildings that were on it to the University of Minnesota. Despite the entreaties of Professor Conway MacMillan and Tilden, the university refused to take responsibility for land in a different country. MacMillan resigned over this issue. Although the station was shut down in 1907, Tilden's enthusiasm was not dampened, and she went on to lead research expeditions to the South Pacific. She continued collecting and writing long after her retirement. The Minnesota Seaside Station was replaced by the more local Lake Itasca Forestry and Biological Station in northern Minnesota in 1909. The following year, despite not having a doctorate, Tilden was made a full professor of the University of Minnesota.

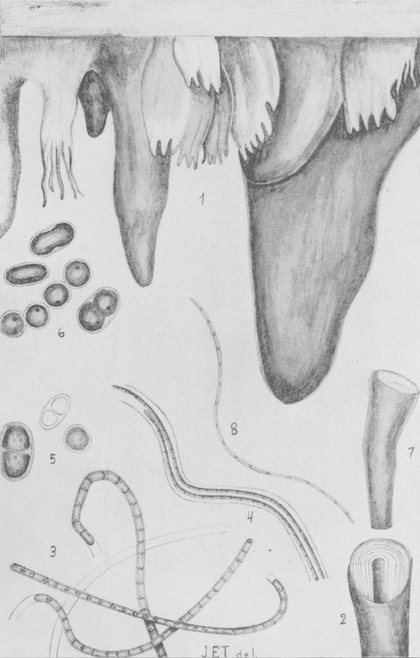
Tilden's 1897 diagram of algal stalactites

She also published the Algae of Minnesota in 1910, which covered "The Myxophyceae of North America and adjacent regions including Central America, Greenland, Bermuda, the West Indies and Hawaii". An academic review of her book by George Francis Atkinson noted that the work was gathered together in one place, but it welcomed a second volume that might make a "thorough and critical study of this material, comparing it with type material", which would then be a "valuable contribution to American Algology".

Tilden traveled widely, especially around the Pacific Ocean, to gather dried plants. During 1909 and 1910, she undertook a trip to the South Pacific accompanied by a fellow professor of Botany, Ethel Winifred B. Chase, and a botanist friend of Ethel's, Bernice Leland. The women amassed a scientifically significant collection of botanical specimens during their trip.

Later, Tilden organized a trip around the world for ten students whose sole purpose was to gather algae and other samples. Participants in this expedition included Caroline M. Crosby, Laurence A. Doore, Thomas T. Earle, Paul J. Philson, Arthur and Violet Nash, Irl and Vesta Warnock, and Laurence and Matilda Jones. Tilden charged the students to accompany her, and obtained loans and grants to fund the travel. The trip gave her a reputation for a lack of integrity. She never obtained formal permission for the trip, and although she directed unbudgeted items to the university, one of the loans she undertook was never repaid. It is said that on her return she was asked to "retire".

Tilden issued several exsiccatae and exsiccata-like specimen series: American Algae (1894-1909), South Pacific Algae (1911) and South Pacific Plants (~ 1913) and (? 1937).

She retired in 1937, having gathered an important collection of algae. The chair of the department, Professor Rosenthal, who had a vendetta with Tilden, made sure that she could not borrow any samples from the university's herbarium. However, Tilden appealed to the university's board, who granted her request that she should be allowed to take her collection with her. The collection was installed on one floor of her new home in Florida, and she used this to publish further research.

In 1935, she published The Algae and Their Life Relations, which was the first scientific work by an American scientist to describe the characteristics of marine and freshwater flora.

The standard author abbreviation Tilden is used to indicate this person as the author when citing a botanical name.

Tilden died in Florida in 1957. After her death, the University of Minnesota's Botany Department acquired many of the algae specimens she had been keeping in her Florida home by collaborating with Joseph Wachter, whom she had given the rights to in her will. A complete set of South Pacific plant specimen series collected by Tilden and 10 University of Minnesota students is held at the University of Melbourne Herbarium. Further specimens are held in Australasian herbaria, including the National Herbarium of Victoria at the Royal Botanic Gardens Victoria, the Australian National Herbarium and the Auckland War Memorial Museum Herbarium.

After her death, two other exsiccata-like series with algae collected by Tilden and her expedition participants in the South Pacific were published. The material was edited by the phycologist Graham Robin South and distributed by the Phycological Herbarium, Memorial University of Newfoundland, between 1976 and 1979.

== Selected publications ==
Selected books and articles include:

- Minnesota Algae: The Myxophyceae of North America and Adjacent Regions Including Central America, Greenland, Bermuda, The West Indies, and Hawaii (2010). Board of Regents of the University for the People of Minnesota, Minneapolis.
- Observations on Some West American Thermal Algae (1898). Botanical Gazette.
- Basicladia, a New Genus of Cladophoraceae (1930). Botanical Gazette.
- Some New Species of Minnesota Algae Which Live In a Calcareous or Siliceous Matrix (1897). Botanical Gazette.
- A Classification of the Algae Based on Evolutionary Development, with Special Reference to Pigmentation (1933). Botanical Gazette.

== Legacy ==
Tildenia is a genus of moths in the family Gelechiidae that was named by C.C. Kossinskaja in 1926 to honor Tilden. Her collection of plants was left to a friend, but he offered it to Minnesota University. There is a small museum about her. One of her biographers summarized his account with the title "Algae of Acrimony".
