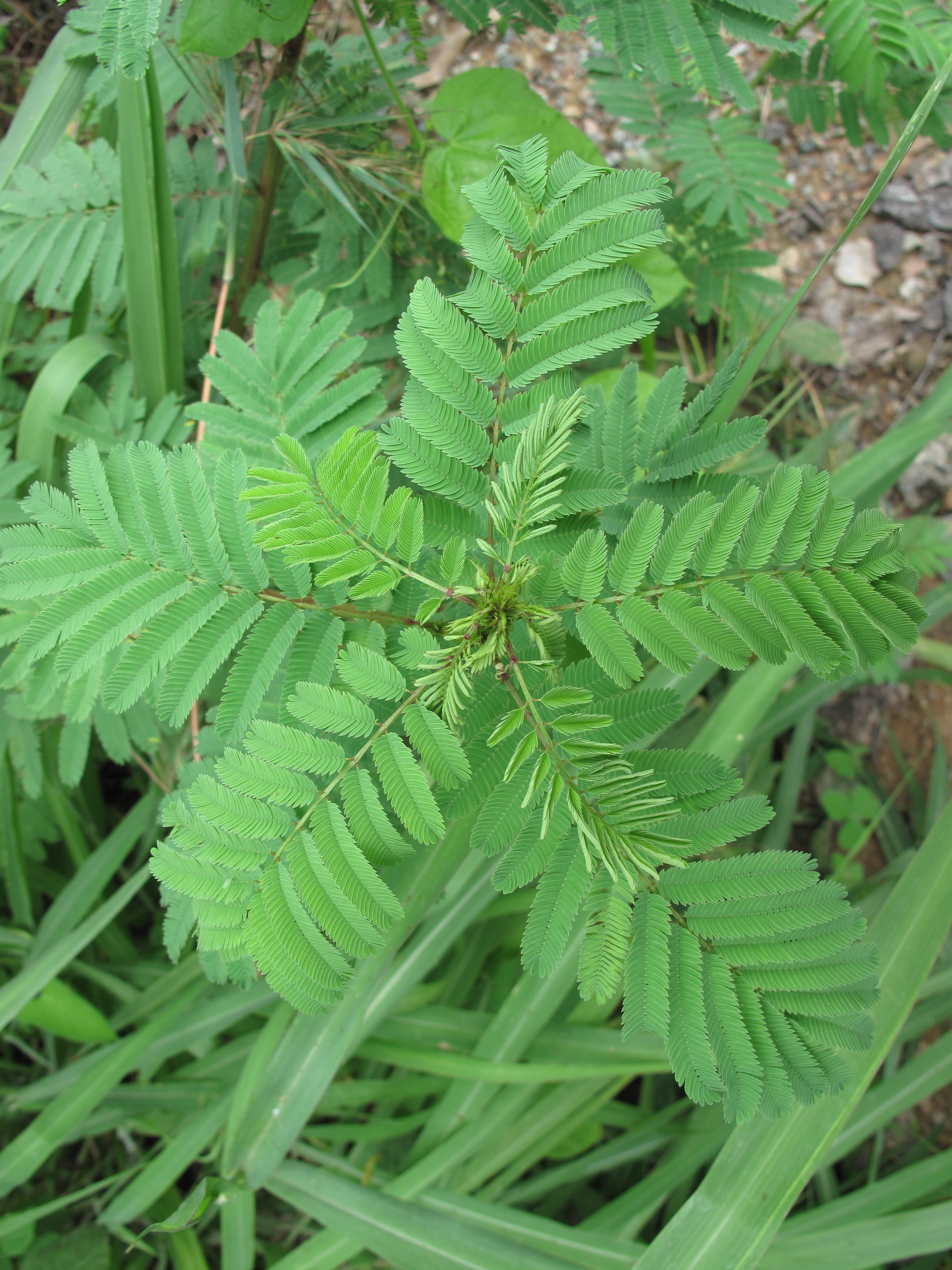

Conservation status
- Apparently Secure (NatureServe)

Scientific classification
- Kingdom: Plantae
- Clade: Tracheophytes
- Clade: Angiosperms
- Clade: Eudicots
- Clade: Rosids
- Order: Fabales
- Family: Fabaceae
- Subfamily: Caesalpinioideae
- Clade: Mimosoid clade
- Genus: Desmanthus
- Species: D. bicornutus

Binomial name
- Desmanthus bicornutus S.Watson

= Desmanthus bicornutus =

Species of legume

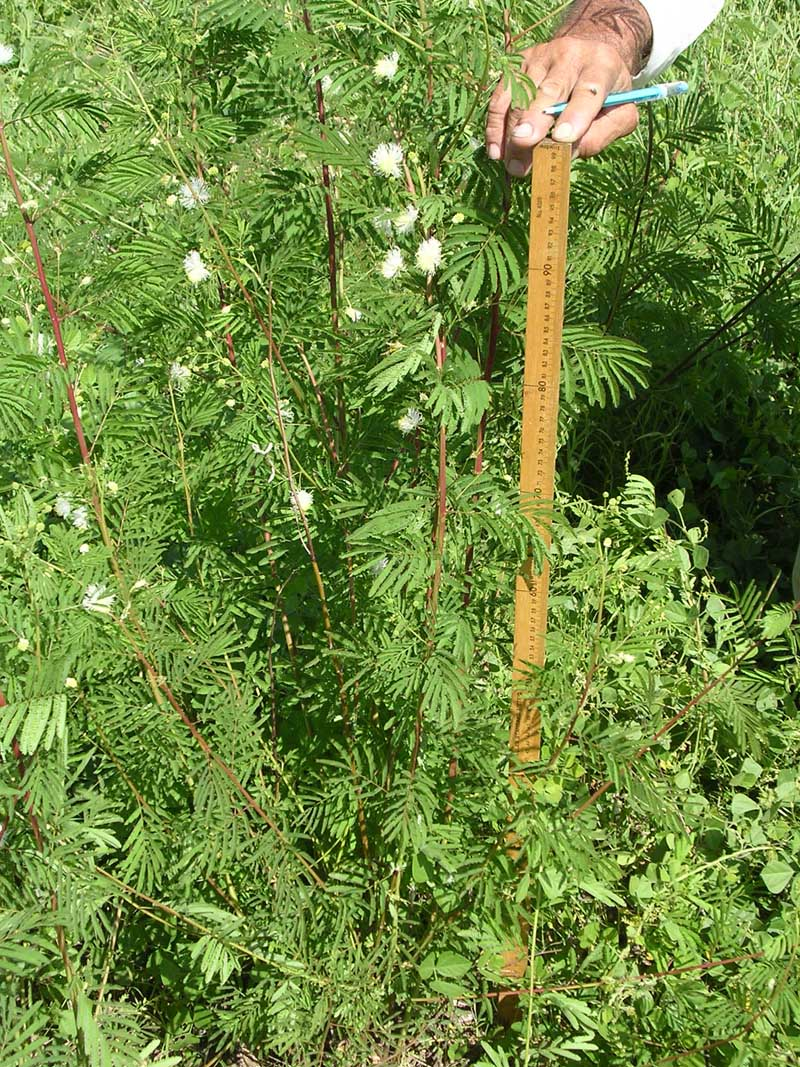
In Queensland

Desmanthus bicornutus is a species of flowering plant in the legume family native to northern and central Mexico and the southwestern United States. It is an "abundant roadside weed across its native range." It is known by the common names ruby bundleflower, two-horn bundleflower, and in Mexican Spanish malvilla de laguna.

== Description ==
A small, upright-standing shrub that grows to about 3 meters in height, Desmanthus bicornutus has a woody base. Young stems are often a deep red color; older stems are shiny red or brown. The compound bipinnate leaves are between 9 cm and 18 cm long.

Desmanthus bicornutus blooms in condensed spikes of 25-60 flowers. These flowers may be perfect (occurring apically), functionally male (occurring towards the base of the flower head above the sterile flowers but below the perfect flowers), or sterile. It bears up to a dozen edible linear pods on fruiting stalks up to 5 cm long. Pods are up to 10 cm long and 5.5 mm wide. Immature pods are red but these turn to a dark brown as they mature.

== Distribution ==
Desmanthus bicornutus grows in the states of Baja California Sur, Chihuahua, Sinaloa, and Sonora in Northern Mexico as well as the central states of Colima, Guerrero, Jalisco, Michoacán, Nayarit, and Veracruz. In the United States, D. bicornutus grows naturally only in the state of Arizona.

== Ecology ==
This plant favors clay, rocky, or sandy soils in its native range. At higher elevations, D. bicornutus can be found amid oak forest and in grasslands. At lower elevations, this plant is found near canyons, roads, and waterways.

Though occurring over an area with a wide annual rainfall range (from 300 mm in Arizona to up to 2,000 mm in coastal, southeast Mexico), D. bicornutus is found in areas with intense dry seasons of up to ten months duration. This species typically dies back to its base during winter or dry season and refoliates when conditions become favorable again. It will also regrow in environments ravaged by wildfire.

== Use ==
In Guerrero, Mexico, D. bicornutus beans are used in the making of salsa.

As a component of grasslands in northern Mexico and southern Arizona, D. bicornutus benefits the grazing of livestock and is tolerant of defoliation caused by heavy grazing.

D. bicornutus has been grown experimentally in Australia. Although it grows abundantly as a weed in its native area and may be a potential invasive species, 14-year-old experimental plots of D. bicornutus in western Queensland have not overgrown their boundaries. A few cultivars of D. bicornutus have been developed by Texas A&M University.
