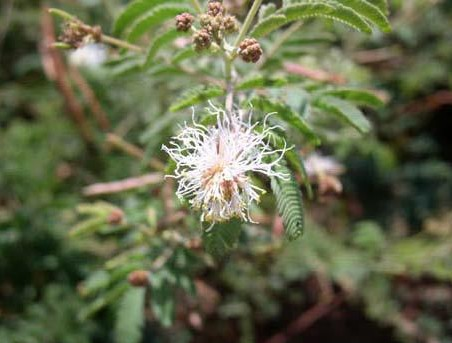

Conservation status
- Secure (NatureServe)

Scientific classification
- Kingdom: Plantae
- Clade: Tracheophytes
- Clade: Angiosperms
- Clade: Eudicots
- Clade: Rosids
- Order: Fabales
- Family: Fabaceae
- Subfamily: Caesalpinioideae
- Clade: Mimosoid clade
- Genus: Desmanthus
- Species: D. velutinus

Binomial name
- Desmanthus velutinus Scheele

= Desmanthus velutinus =

Species of legume

Desmanthus velutinus is a species of flowering plant in the legume family known by the common name velvet bundleflower. It is native to New Mexico and Texas in the United States and Coahuila in Mexico. It may also occur in Oklahoma.

This species is a perennial herb with spreading stems up to two feet long. The blue-green leaves are 3 to 4 inches long and are made up of several pairs of leaflets. The flower is white. The fruit is a straight pod up to three inches long.

This plant grows on calcareous soils, such as limestone. It does not grow in wet areas.

This species is used as forage for livestock such as sheep and goats. Wildlife such as deer graze it, and birds such as quail eat the seeds. This species can be planted to reduce erosion. It is often an ingredient in seed mixes which are used for range improvement.
