= Juan de Fuca Provincial Park =

Provincial park in British Columbia, Canada

- IUCN category II (national park)
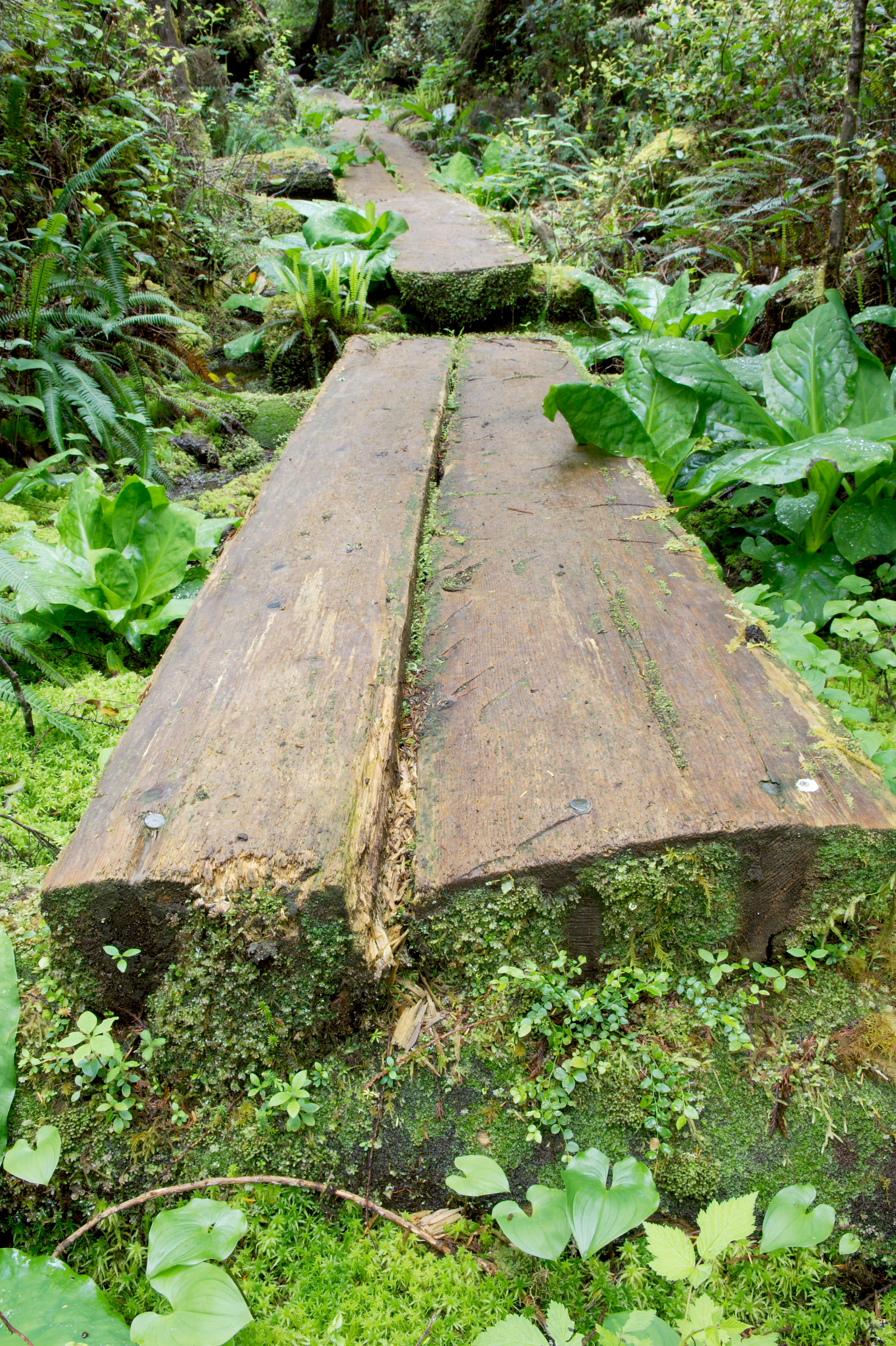
- A section of trail in Juan de Fuca Provincial Park

- Location within Vancouver Island Location within British Columbia Location within Capital Regional District
- Interactive map of Juan de Fuca Provincial Park
- Location: Vancouver Island, British Columbia, Canada
- Nearest city: Port Renfrew and Sooke
- Coordinates: 48°29′00″N 124°17′00″W
- Area: 1,528 ha (5.90 sq mi)
- Established: April 4, 1996
- Visitors: 450,408 (in 2017-18)
- Governing body: BC Parks

Juan de Fuca Provincial Park is a provincial park located on the west coast of Vancouver Island in British Columbia, Canada. The park was established on April 4, 1996 by combining three former parks — China Beach, Loss Creek, and Botanical Beach — into one provincial park. It is the location of the majority of the Juan de Fuca Marine Trail, which is a southern compliment to the West Coast Trail within Pacific Rim National Park Reserve.

== History ==
The trail was originally intended to be a part of the Trans Canada Trail and was funded by Parks Canada, then later turned over to the province of British Columbia. The work was contracted to Island Green Forestry and done by 20 labourers and three Chainsaw operators.

The region was recognized as biologically significant, and Josephine Tilden of the University of Minnesota installed the first marine research station in the Pacific Northwest at Botanical Beach in 1901. The University of Minnesota maintained a research station here for five years, but they left in 1906. Conway MacMillan resigned from the University of Minnesota after the university refused to take ownership of land in a different country. After the departure of the University of Minnesota, the University of British Columbia, University of Washington, Simon Fraser University, and the University of Victoria have done research in the area. Prior to the establishment, there were several parks in the area protecting what is now within the boundaries of the park.

=== Former parks ===
Loss Creek Provincial Park was a 21-hectare (52-acre) Class A park established on June 29, 1959 at the bridge over the creek of the same name. It was the smallest and least developed of the three parks.

China Beach Provincial Park was a 61-hectare (150-acre) Class A park at China Beach established on January 4, 1967. It was the best developed of the three former parks, featuring a day-use area and vehicle-accessible campground. The park's creation came about in a trade between the provincial government and a forestry company. By allowing logging in the Bedwell Valley of Strathcona Provincial Park the company agreed to hand over the land for China Beach.

Botanical Beach Provincial Park was a 351-hectare (870-acre) Class A park established in 1989. It was the largest of the three former parks. At the time of creation, the park was 76% natural environment, with plans for complete restoration of the entire park. This included 231 hectares (570 acres) of land and 120 hectares (300 acres) of foreshore. The park was established to encourage education and research in the area. A nature reserve was established in 1961, and expanded in 1966 to include 47 hectares (120 acres) and 2,200 metres (2,400 yd) of shoreline. The initial proposal for the park was investigated in 1981, with the final park was established in 1989 as a Class A park. Access to the park has been possible by the current gravel road since prior to its establishment.

=== Consolidation ===
On April 4, 1996, BC Parks consolidated all three former parks into a single larger park named Juan de Fuca Provincial Park. The new park also included the locally popular and formerly unprotected areas of Sombrio Beach and Mystic Beach.

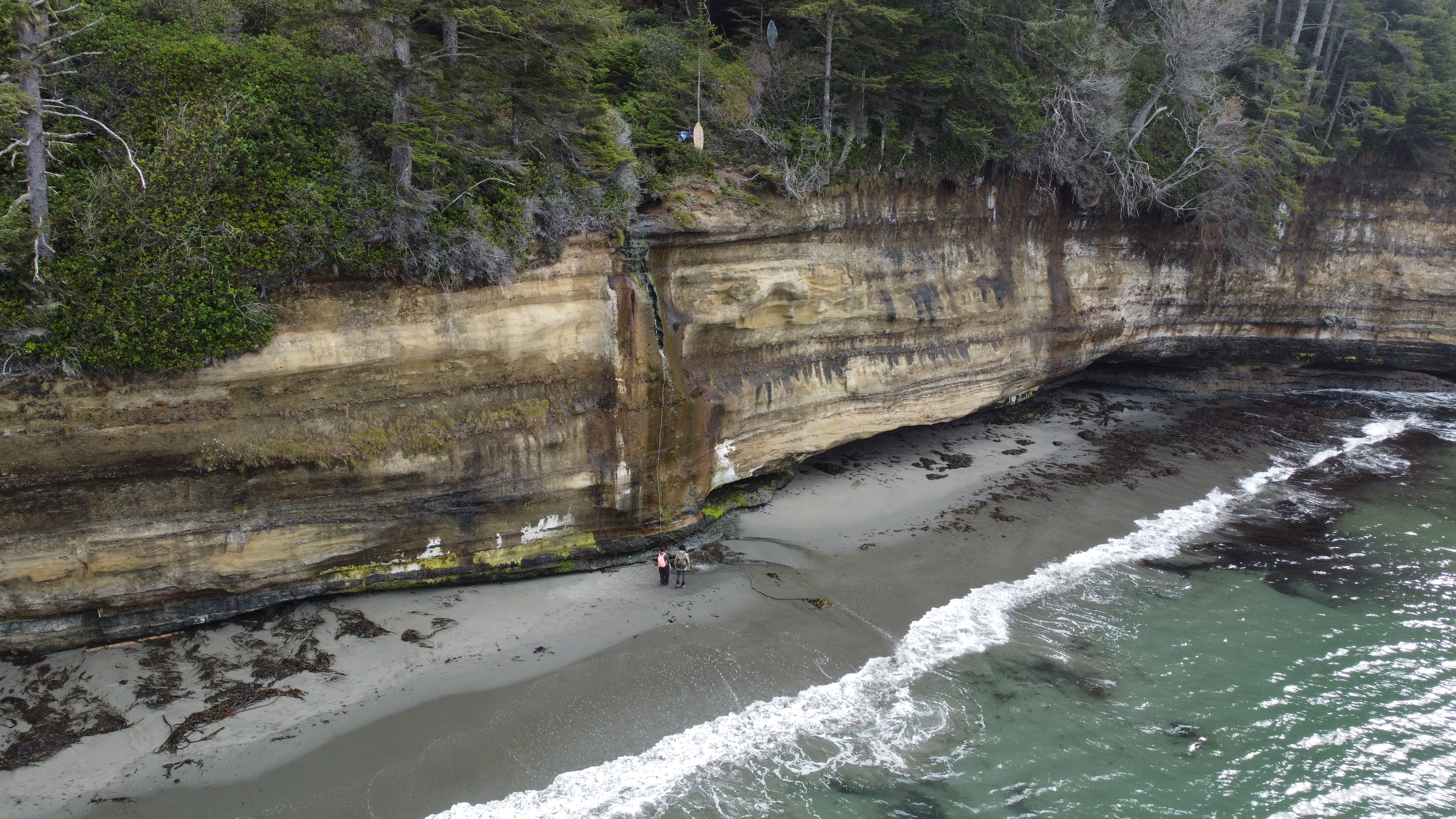
Mystic Beach in Juan de Fuca Provincial Park

== Geography ==
The park has an area of 15.28 km^{2} (5.90 sq mi). The Juan DeFuca trail was cut and built through the forest along the coast in 1995 and 1996. The area from Minute creek to Sombrio beach was clearcut in 1994 and much of the trail was cut through the clear cut area. 47 km (29 mi) hiking trail, very similar to the West Coast Trail Which was originally a survival trail for shipwrecked sailors in the graveyard of the Pacific in Pacific Rim National Park.

The park is located 35 kilometres (22 mi) west of Sooke and 36 kilometres (22 mi) east of Port Renfrew, British Columbia.

== Conservation ==
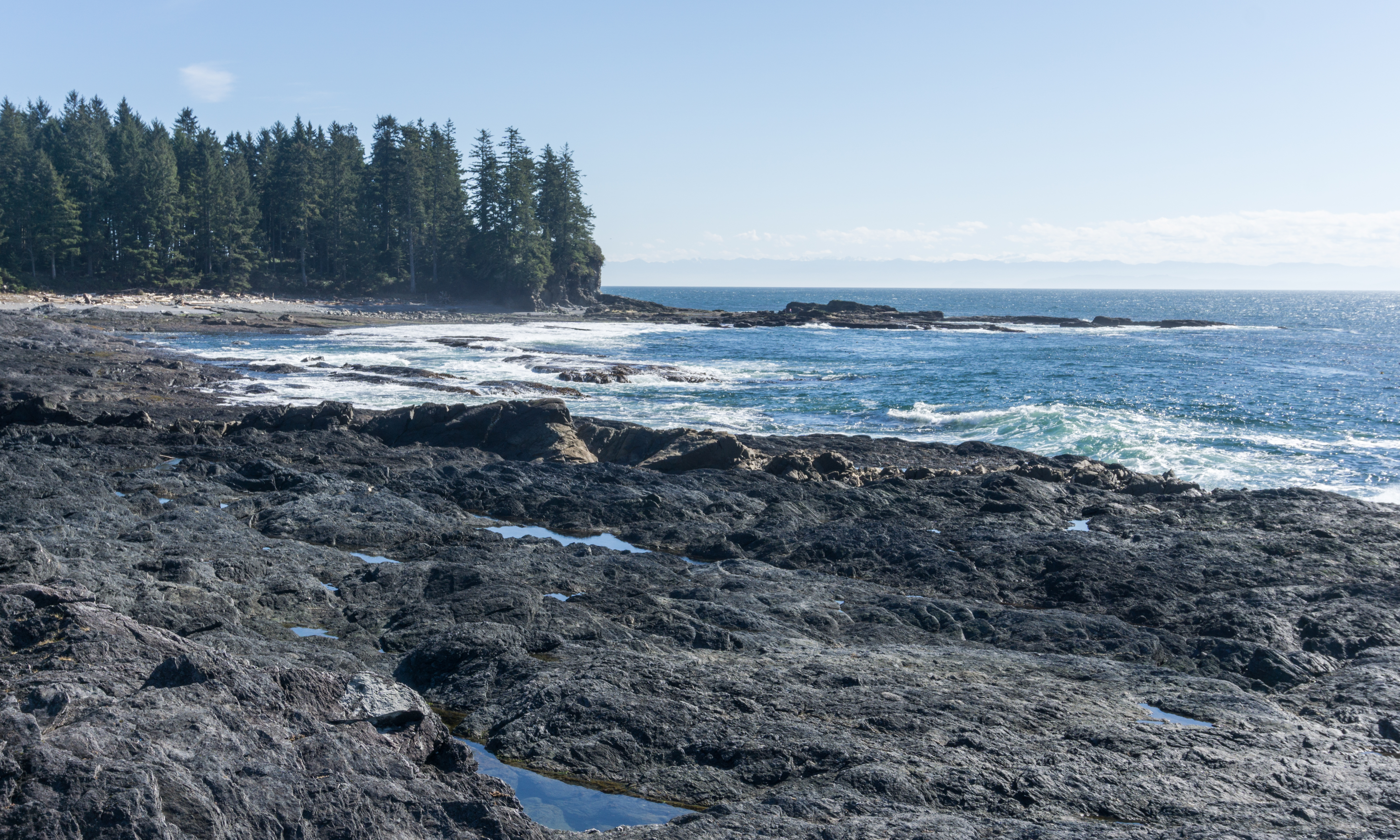
Botanical Beach, located at the northernmost reach of Juan de Fuca Provincial Park near Port Renfrew

The primary role of Juan de Fuca Provincial Park is to protect a highly scenic and unique shoreline area between Sooke and Port Renfrew along the Strait of Juan de Fuca. The park encompasses a wide spectrum of natural values from forests to wildlife that must be protected and managed to reflect the purpose for which it was created. Juan de Fuca Provincial Park provides a protected habitat and natural corridor for many larger species of west coast mammals such as cougar, deer, black bear, wolf, otter, seal and sea lions. Red, purple and orange starfish and sea urchins, white gooseneck barnacles, blue mussels and green sea anemones and sea cucumbers only begin to hint at the colourful spectrum of intertidal life thriving here.

== Recreation ==
The following recreational activities are available: vehicle accessible and wilderness camping, hiking, picnicking, interpretive walks, swimming, canoeing and kayaking, fishing, SCUBA diving, windsurfing, and surfing. The beach is best visited at low tide.

== See also ==
- List of British Columbia Provincial Parks
- List of Canadian provincial parks
- Juan de Fuca Trail
