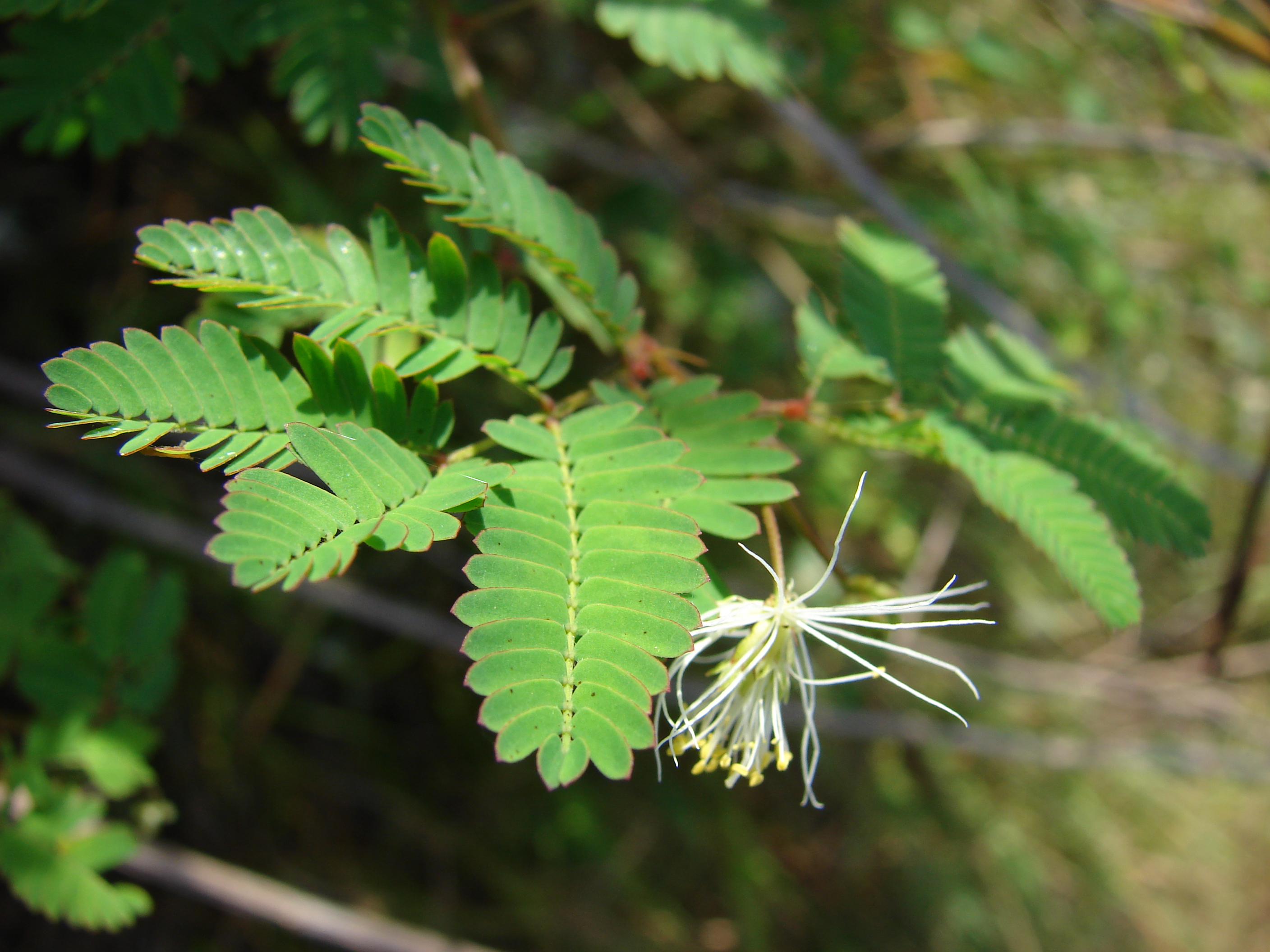
- Desmanthus pernambucanus

Scientific classification
- Kingdom: Plantae
- Clade: Tracheophytes
- Clade: Angiosperms
- Clade: Eudicots
- Clade: Rosids
- Order: Fabales
- Family: Fabaceae
- Subfamily: Caesalpinioideae
- Clade: Mimosoid clade
- Genus: Desmanthus; Willd.

Type species
- Desmanthus virgatus (L.) Willd.

Species
- See text

Synonyms
- Acuan Medik.; Darlingtonia DC.

= Desmanthus =

Genus of legumes

Desmanthus is a genus of flowering plants in the mimosoid clade of the subfamily Caesalpinioideae of the pea family, Fabaceae. The name is derived from the Greek words δεσμός (desmos), meaning "bundle", and ἄνθος (anthos), meaning "flower". It contains about 24 species of herbs and shrubs that are sometimes described as being suffruticose and have bipinnate leaves. Desmanthus is closely related to Leucaena and in appearance is similar to Neptunia. Like Mimosa and Neptunia, Desmanthus species fold their leaves in the evening. They are native to Mexico and North, Central and South America. Members of the genus are commonly known as bundleflowers. Donkey beans is another common name and originated in Central America, where Desmanthus species are highly regarded as fodder for these domestic draught animals.

== Description ==
- Leucaena group
  - - Schleinitzia
    - - Kanaloa
      - Desmanthus
  - Leucaena

Phylogenetic tree of Leucaena group

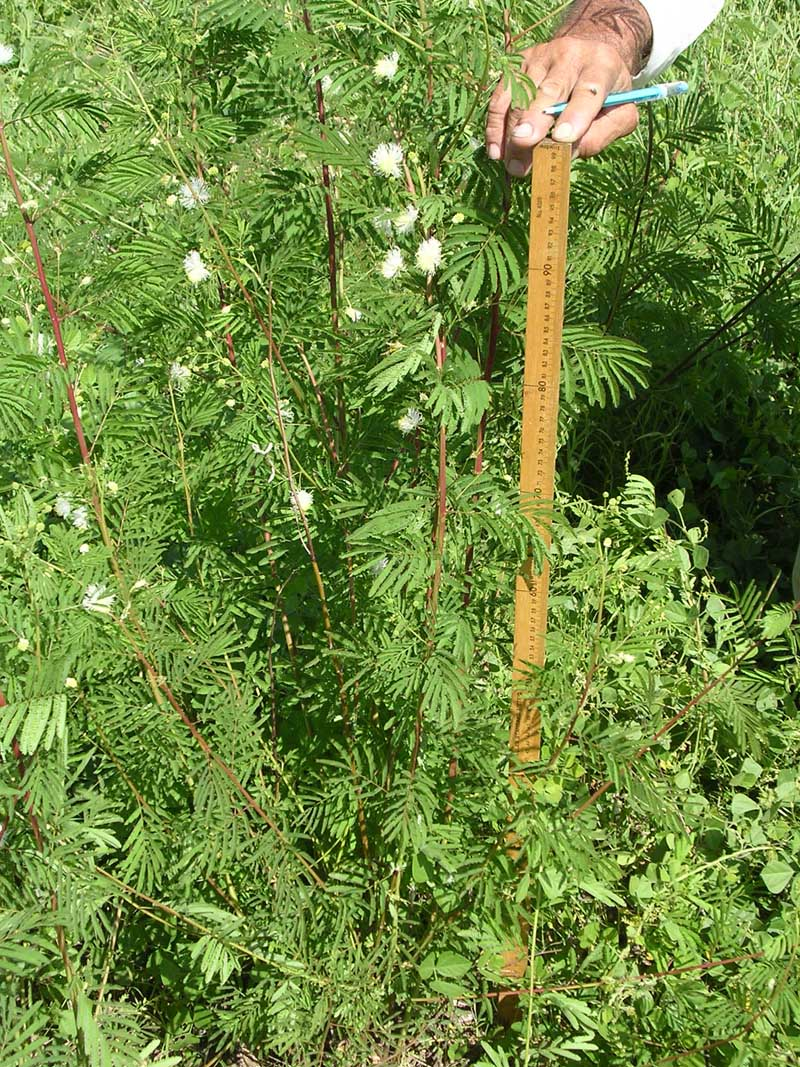
Desmanthus bicornutus

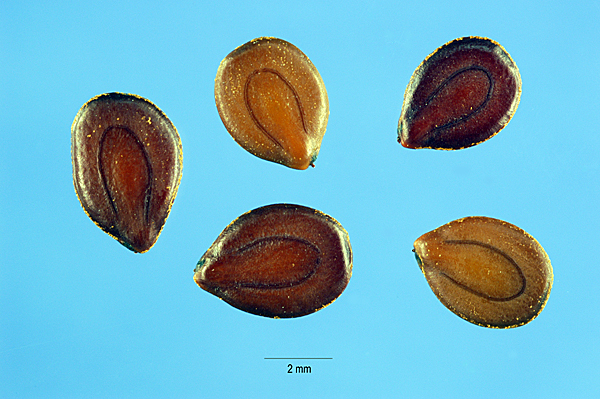
Desmanthus illinoensis seeds

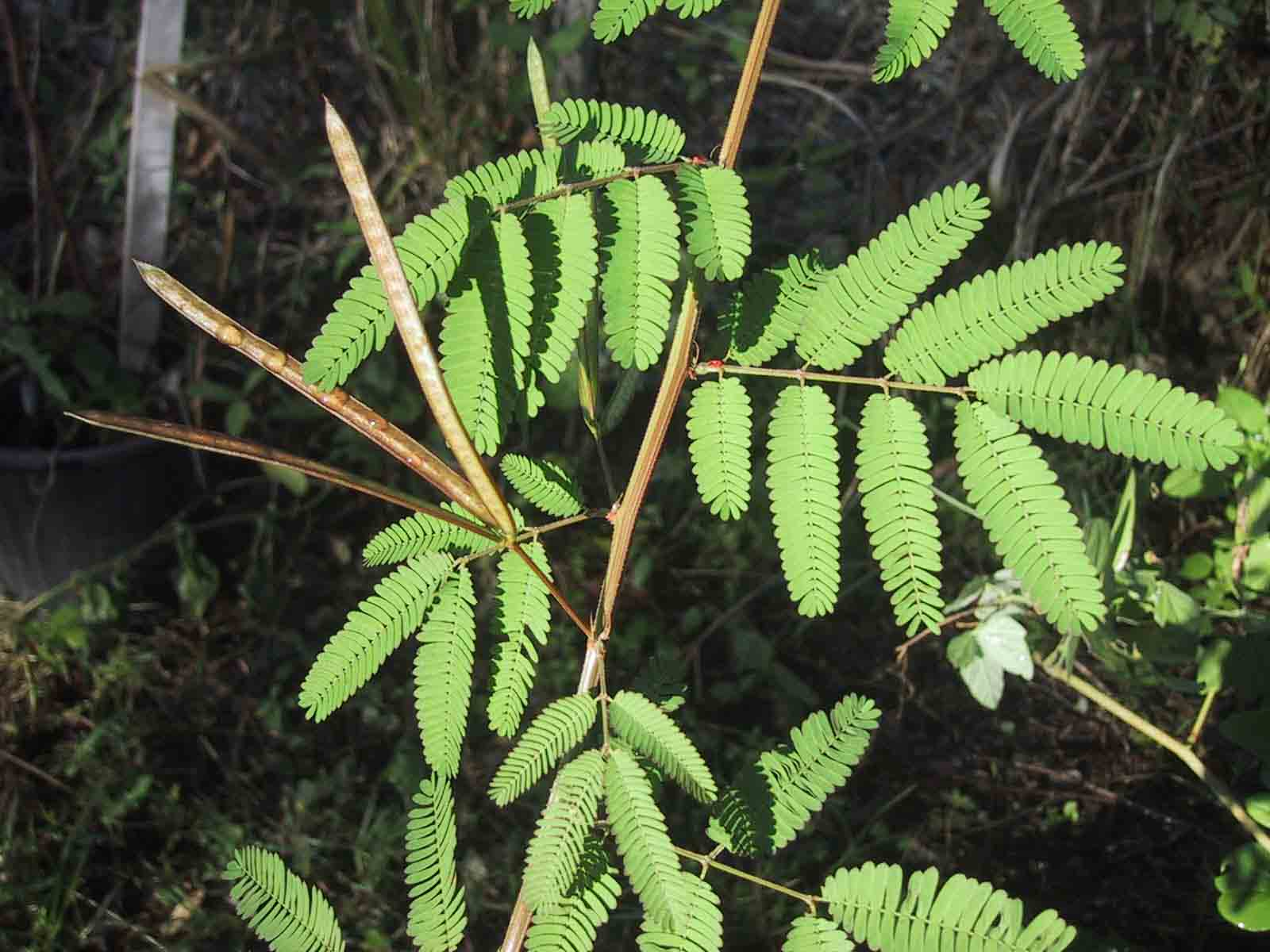
Desmanthus pernambucanus

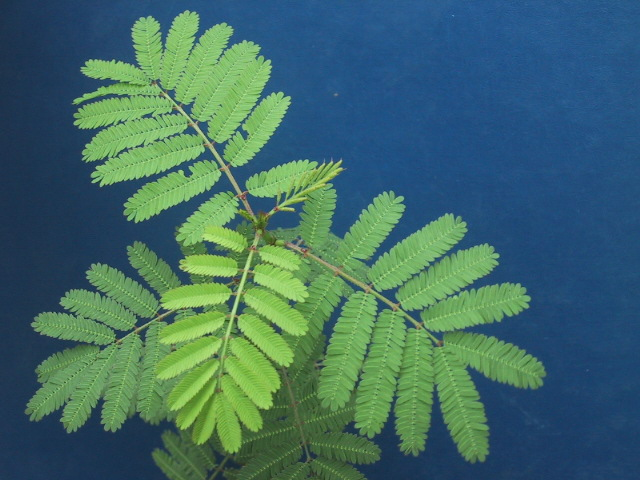
Desmanthus pubescens

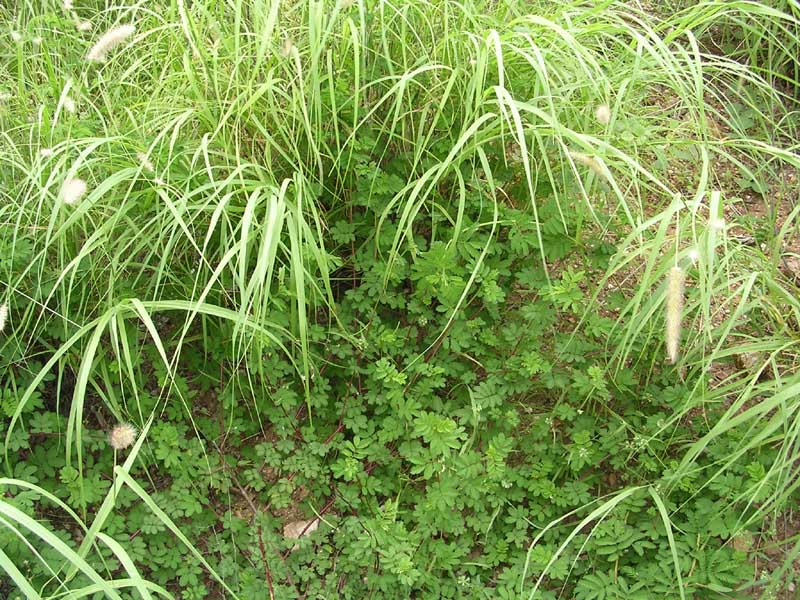
Desmanthus virgatus and buffelgrass

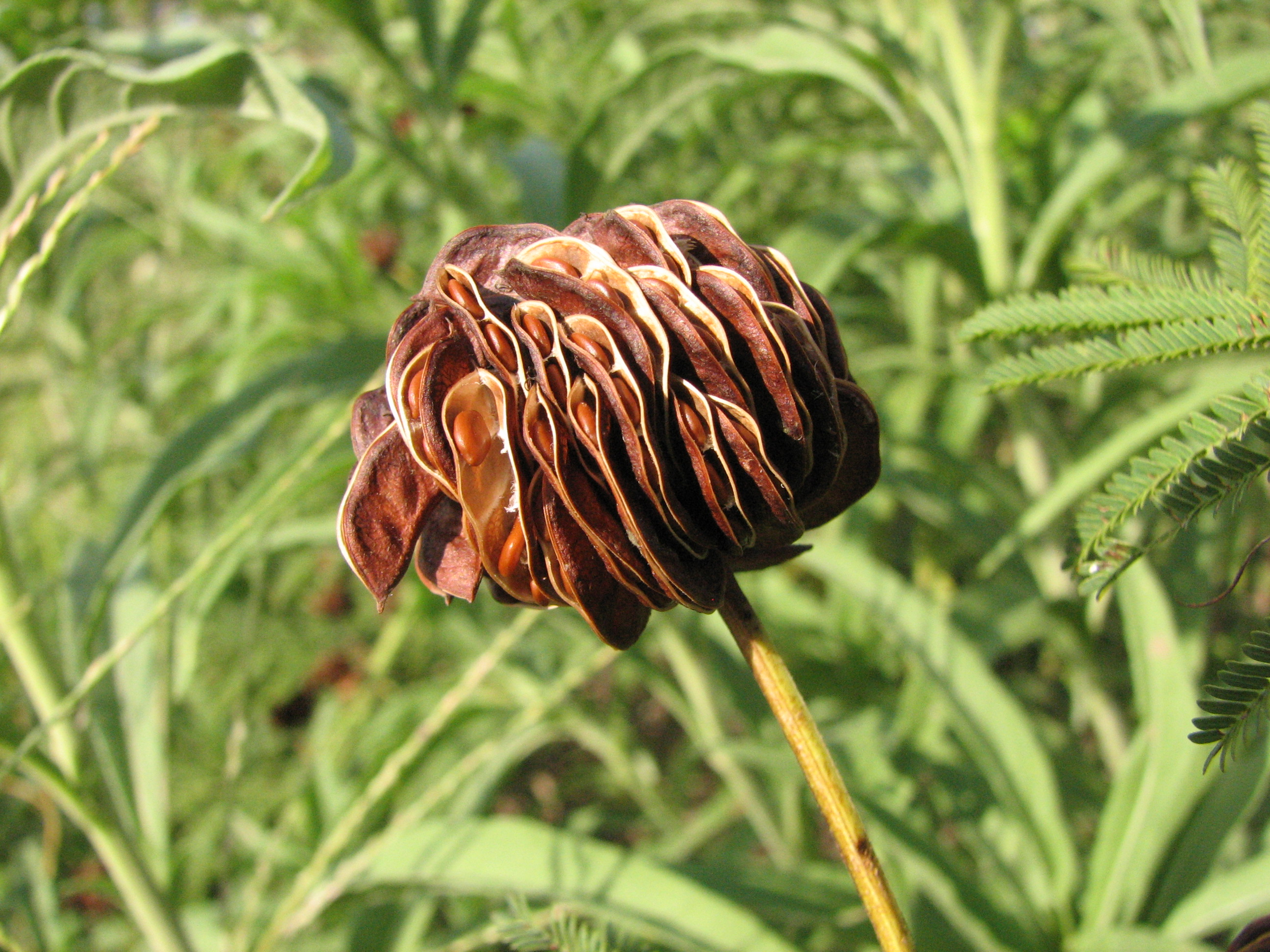
Desmanthus illinoensis

There are considerable differences in the descriptions of Desmanthus in the literature (see Bogdan 1977; Skerman 1977; National Academy of Science 1979; Allen & Allen 1981; Reid 1983; Hacker 1990). For example, Reid (1983) says that Desmanthus virgatus ranges from "leggy" plants in the humid tropics to compact bushes in the semi-arid zones to prostrate in the montane zones; Allen and Allen (1981) state that Desmanthus grows to 3 metres; Hacker (1990) states that D. virgatus is an erect shrub 1.3 metres tall. All these views illustrate the great diversity and polymorphism within the genus and between species.

== Phytochemistry ==
The root-bark of D. illinoensis, which accounts for half of the total weight of the root system, is reported to contain anywhere from 0 to 0.34% DMT and 0.11% N-Methyltryptamine. Alkaloid content is highly variable in this species.

Likewise, root bark of Desmanthus leptolobus has been found to contain N,N-DMT and related tryptamines. While its only reported quantitative analysis was 0.14% (Appleseed), all instances of co-occurrence with D. illinoensis showed it to be noticeably stronger than D. illinoensis, according to co-thin layer chromatography of the root bark.

== Uses ==
During the 1990s in Australia, three species of Desmanthus were released as pasture legumes and many other accessions are being evaluated as pasture species for clay soils. The three old released cultivars are:

- Desmanthus virgatus Cultivar "Marc"(Accession number: CPI 78373) which is described as early flowering, decumbent to ascending, growing 30 to 60 cm tall and originates from Argentina.
- Desmanthus leptophyllus Cultivar "Bayamo" (CPI 82285), mid season flowering, ascending type, 95–135 cm tall, from Cuba
- Desmanthus pubescens Cultivar "Uman" (CPI 92803), late flowering, decumbent shrub, taller and wider spreading than Marc, 40–100 cm tall, from Mexico.

Of these three, only the cultivar Marc is still commercially available. In 2015 five new cultivars of Desmanthus named JCU 1 to JCU 5 have been granted PBR and are commercially available as a blend named "Progardes", consisting of D. bicornutus, D. leptophyllus and D. virgatus, these have been developed in Queensland Australia as a pasture legume for semi-arid tropical/subtropical alkaline clay soils. Progardes became available in 2013 in Northern Australia and some 300,00 ha (to 2026) has been sown into native and buffelgrass pasture. In recent times additional cultivars have seen developed including cv JCU 6,7,8 and 9. These can also be included in the Progardes blend. The breeding of intraspecific and interspecific crosses are well advanced. In terms of animal production Progardes has been shown to enhance beef production.

In its native range in the United States, the Land Institute is selectively breeding the widely distributed Illinois bundleflower (Desmanthus illinoensis) to be a perennial seed crop for human food, in addition to forage / pasture. It offers many of the advantages in terms of nutrition, protein and nitrogen fixation as soybeans or alfalfa, but as a perennial. Perennial crops tend to require less input of chemicals and energy, and less weed control, for comparable or higher yields to annuals in many systems.

== Species ==
- Desmanthus acuminatus Benth. – wild tantan
- Desmanthus balsensis J.L.Contr.
- Desmanthus bicornutus S.Watson – two-horn bundleflower
- Desmanthus brevipes B.L.Turner
- Desmanthus cooleyi (Eaton) Trel. – Cooley's bundleflower
- Desmanthus covillei (Britton & Rose) Wiggins ex B.L.Turner – Coville's bundleflower
- Desmanthus fruticosus Rose
- Desmanthus glandulosus (B.L.Turner) Luckow – glandular bundleflower
- Desmanthus hexapetalus (Micheli) J.F.Macbr.
- Desmanthus illinoensis (Michx.) MacMill. ex B.L.Rob. – Illinois bundleflower
- Desmanthus interior (Britton & Rose) Bullock
- Desmanthus leptolobus Torr. & A.Gray – slenderlobe bundleflower
- Desmanthus leptophyllus Kunth – slenderleaf bundleflower
- Desmanthus obtusus S.Watson – bluntpod bundleflower
- Desmanthus oligospermus Brandegee
- Desmanthus painteri (Britton & Rose) Standl.
- Desmanthus paspalaceus (Lindm.) Burkart
- Desmanthus pernambucanus (L.) Thell. – pigeon bundleflower
- Desmanthus pringlei (Britton & Rose) F.J.Herm.
- Desmanthus pubescens B.L.Turner
- Desmanthus pumilus (Schltdl.) J.F.Macbr.
- Desmanthus reticulatus Benth. – netleaf bundleflower
- Desmanthus tatuhyensis Hoehne – dwarf bundleflower
  - var. brevipes (B.L.Turner) Luckow
  - var. tatuhyensis Hoehne
- Desmanthus velutinus Scheele – velvet bundleflower
- Desmanthus virgatus (L.) Willd. – wild tantan
  - var. depressus (Humb. & Bonpl. ex Willd.) B.L.Turner
  - var. glandulosus B.L.Turner

== See also ==
- Psychedelic plants
