= Desmanthus leptolobus =

Scientific classification
- Kingdom: Plantae
- Clade: Tracheophytes
- Clade: Angiosperms
- Clade: Eudicots
- Clade: Rosids
- Order: Fabales
- Family: Fabaceae
- Subfamily: Caesalpinioideae
- Clade: Mimosoid clade
- Genus: Desmanthus
- Species: D. leptolobus

Binomial name
- Desmanthus leptolobus Torr. & A.Gray 1840

Species of legume

Desmanthus leptolobus, known as prairie mimosa, prairie bundleflower or slenderlobe bundleflower, is a flowering plant of the genus Desmanthus. It is native to Kansas, Oklahoma, and Texas and has spread to Missouri and New Mexico. It is often locally abundant over large expanses of rolling prairie.

== Description ==
Desmanthus leptolobus grows easily from seed in USDA Hardiness Zones 5–8, handling freezes to ~-20 °C. The species is usually erect when young, trailing/spreading as it ages. Few to many, red-green trailing stems up to roughly a metre in length and tapering cylindrical taproots up to a metre and a half by one to two centimetres in diameter. The leaves are normally two and a half centimetres to six centimetres long, and the curved, pointed leaflets are approximately two to five centimetres long by five to ten millimetres wide. The latter are narrowly elliptic to linear and arranged in 15 to 25 pairs.

Seeds are thinner and more elongated than those of the closely related species Desmanthus illinoensis.

== Uses ==
Root bark of D. leptolobus has been found to contain a psychedelic compound called DMT and other related tryptamines. While its only reported quantitative analysis found concentrations of 0.14% of DMT (lower than has been found in Desmanthus illinoensis), one person documented a "subjectively stronger response" than D. illinoensis. Desmanthus species have been found to have variable concentrations of DMT.

The species is an early-appearing component of land-reclamation vegetation, rapidly disappearing once shrub and tree species establish.
