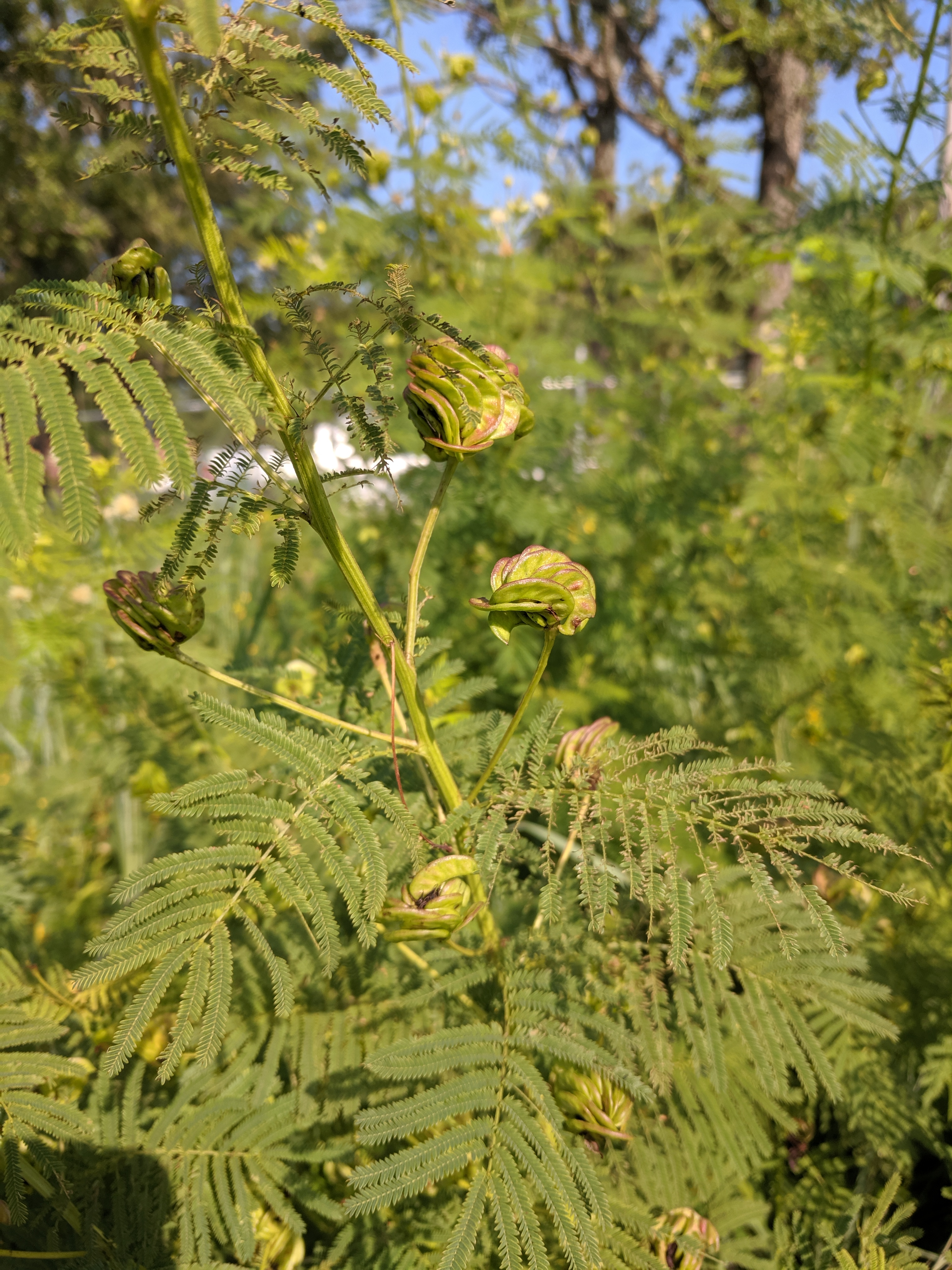
- Desmanthus illinoensis
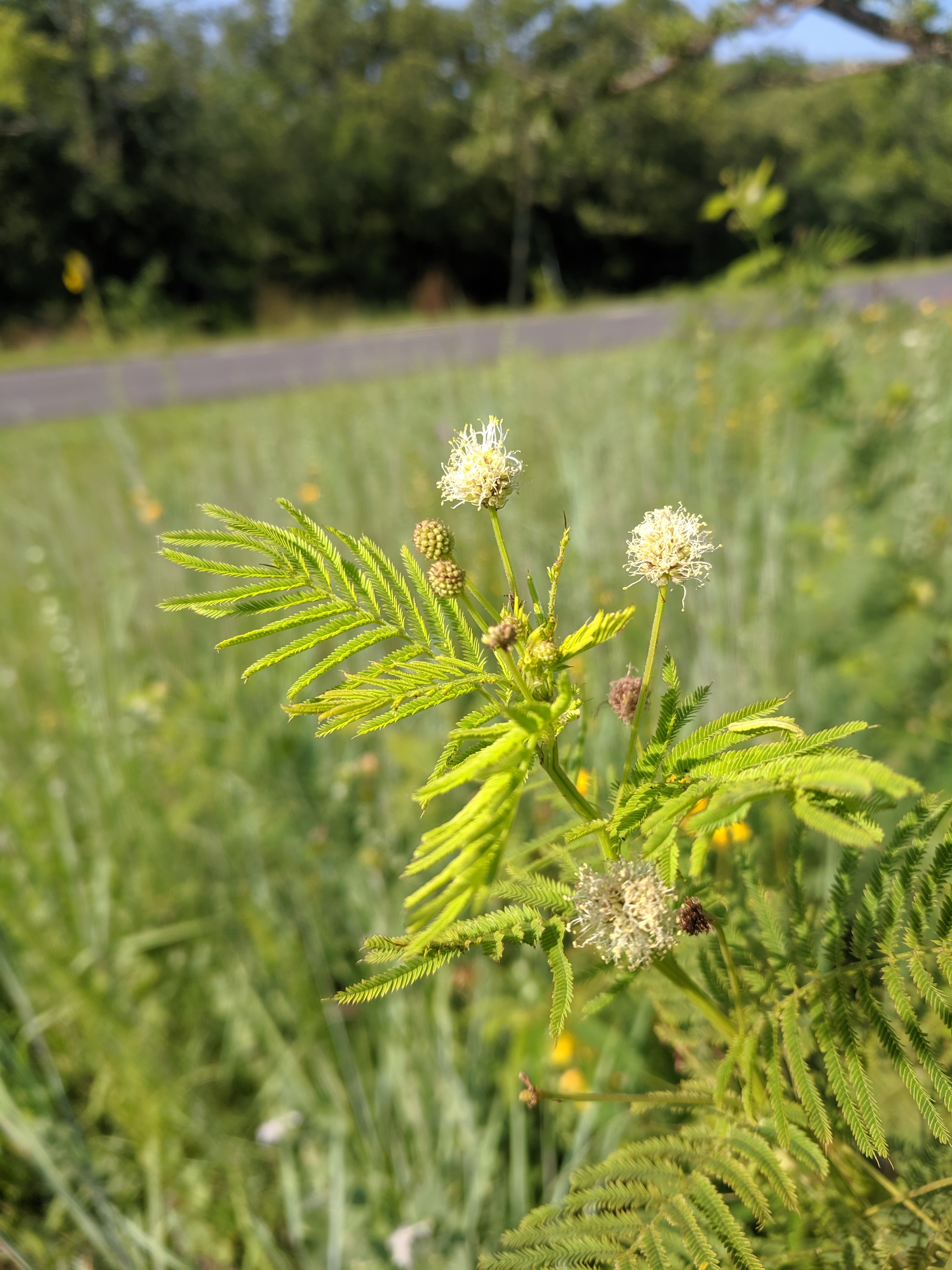
- Desmanthus illinoensis flower heads

Conservation status
- Secure (NatureServe)

Scientific classification
- Kingdom: Plantae
- Clade: Tracheophytes
- Clade: Angiosperms
- Clade: Eudicots
- Clade: Rosids
- Order: Fabales
- Family: Fabaceae
- Subfamily: Caesalpinioideae
- Clade: Mimosoid clade
- Genus: Desmanthus
- Species: D. illinoensis

Binomial name
- Desmanthus illinoensis (Michx.) MacMill. ex B.L.Rob. & Fernald

Synonyms
- List: Acacia brachyloba Willd. (1806); Acacia glandulosa Willd. (1806); Acuan glandulosum (Michx.) A.Heller (1900); Acuan illinoense (Michx.) Kuntze (1891); Darlingtonia brachyloba DC. (1825); Darlingtonia brachyloba var. glandulosa (Michx.) Torr. & A.Gray (1840); Darlingtonia brachyloba var. illinoensis (Michx.) Torr. & A.Gray (1840); Darlingtonia brachyloba var. intermedia (Torr.) Torr. & A.Gray (1840); Darlingtonia brevifolia Raf. (1836); Darlingtonia glandulosa (Michx.) DC. (1825); Darlingtonia illinoensis (Michx.) DC. ex Torr. (1827); Darlingtonia intermedia Torr. (1827); Desmanthus brachylobus Benth. (1841); Desmanthus brachylobus var. glandulosus (Michx.) Engelm. & A.Gray (1845); Desmanthus falcatus Scheele (1848); Desmanthus illinoensis var. glandulosus (Michx.) J.F.Macbr. (1919); Inga magdalenae Spreng. ex DC. (1825); Mimosa brachyloba Muhl. ex Steud. (1841); Mimosa contortuplicata Zuccagni (1806); Mimosa glandulosa Michx. (1803); Mimosa illinoensis Michx. (1803)

= Desmanthus illinoensis =

Species of flowering plant in the pea family

Desmanthus illinoensis, commonly known as Illinois bundleflower, prairie-mimosa or prickleweed, is a common plant in the central and southern United States.

== Chemistry ==
The roots of D. illinoensis have been found to contain N,N-DMT, NMT, N-hydroxy-N-methyltryptamine, 2-hydroxy-N-methyltryptamine, and gramine.

== Habitat ==
The plant can be found in many areas of the south, central, and midwestern United States.

It can often be found growing on the sides of roads, particularly on southern exposures, needing full sun and ample moisture during its short growing season. The mature plants often grow and flower in mowed areas. In many parts of its native habitat, road sides are only mowed twice a year. In the late spring and again in late fall. The early mowing helps clear away competitors that might impede growth. The late mowing chops up the dry seed pods resulting in some scarification and resulting in better germination.

USDA hardiness zones 5–8 are recommended for outside cultivation. The waxy seed coat needs to be scarified prior to planting.

== Toxicity ==
The root bark contains gramine, which is toxic to some animals.

== Uses ==
=== Nutrition ===
The plant is nutritious and high in protein.

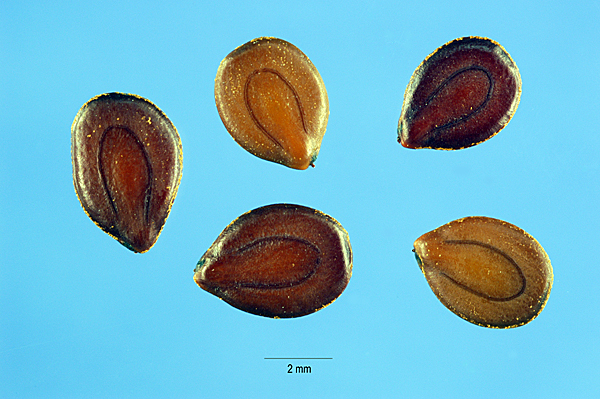
Desmanthus illinoensis seeds

The Land Institute in Salina, Kansas has done extensive research into the food uses of the seeds of this plant. Studies found the dry seeds composed of 38% protein, compared to 40% for soybeans.

=== Ayahuasca analogue ===
To produce prairiehuasca, the roots are ground up with a North American native source of beta-Carbolines (e.g., Maypop) to make a hallucinogenic plant concoction analogous to the shamanic South American brew ayahuasca.
