= Conway MacMillan =

American botanist (1867–1929)

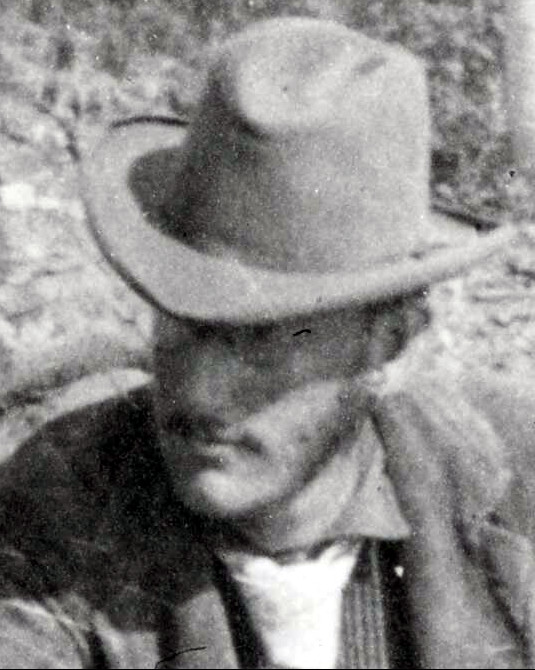
- as part of a survey team
- Born: August 26, 1867; Hillsdale, Michigan
- Died: June 5, 1929 (aged 61)
- Occupations: Researcher and teacher
- Employer: University of Minnesota

Conway MacMillan (August 26, 1867 – June 5, 1929) was an American botanist from Minnesota.

== Life ==
MacMillan was born in Hillsdale, Michigan. He took his first and master's degrees in Nebraska. After this he spent a year at Johns Hopkins University followed by a year at Harvard.

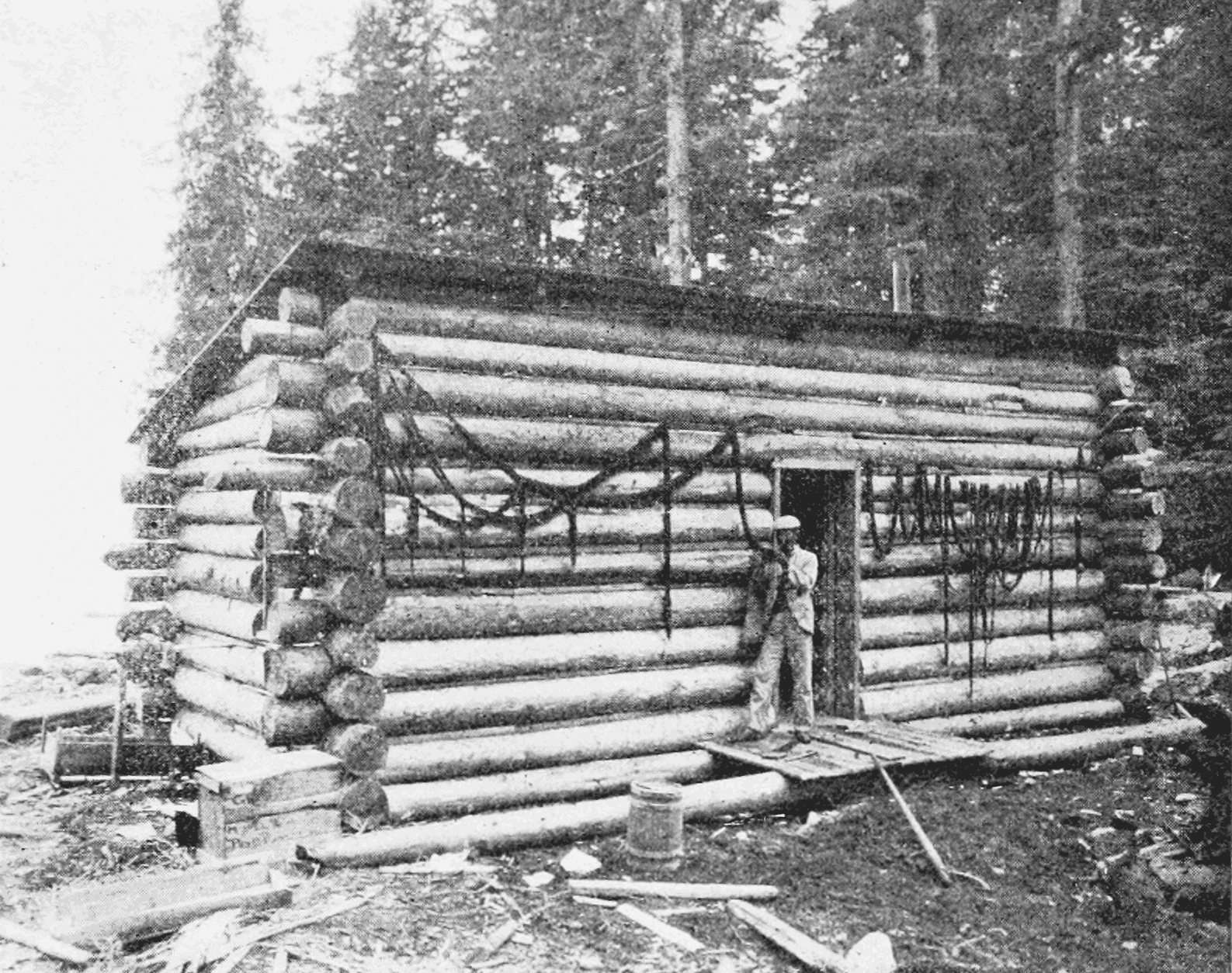
One of the buildings at the Minnesota Seaside Station

Macmillan worked at the University of Minnesota until he resigned over the problems with Josephine Tilden's "Minnesota Seaside Station" in Canada. MacMillan headed the research station where 25 to 30 students would study each summer. Under his leadership the land gathered a number of buildings and a three-mile road was built from Port Renfrew to allow access.

Macmillan died in 1929.

== Works ==
The standard author abbreviation MacMill. is used to indicate this person as the author when citing a botanical name.

- 1890, Notes on some phanerogams of central Minnesota.
- 1891, Interesting Anatomical and Physiological Researches. Botanical Gazette, Vol. 16, Nº 11, pp. 305–311.
- 1891, On the growth-periodicity of the potato tuber. Ed. Ferris Bros.
- 1893, On Methods of Defending the Existence of a Sham Biology in America. Science 26; 21 (538): 289–291.
- 1893, Geological and Natural History Survey of Minnesota. The American Naturalist, Vol. 27, Nº 316, pp. 365–366.
- 1895, The influence of spray & rain on the forms of leaves. Science 11; 2 (41): 481–482.
- 1897, Notes for teachers on the geographical distribution of plants. 6 pp.
- 1901, Some considerations on the nature, organization and work of the modern botanical institute. Ed. The Pioneer Press. 27 pp.
- 1888, Twenty-two common insects of Nebraska. Bulletin of the Agricultural Experiment Station of Nebraska. Ed. Univ. Nebraska. 101 pp.
- 1899, Minnesota plant life. Geological and natural history survey. Report of the survey. Botanical series. xxv, 566 pp. ilus. 4 planchas.
- 1890, Some considerations on the alternation of generations in plants: Delivered before the Botanical seminar of the University of Nebraska, 1896. Ed. The Seminar. 41 pp.
- 1892, The Metaspermae of the Minnesota Valley. A List of the higher seed-producing plants indigenous to the drainage-basin of the Minnesota River. 826 pp. Reimprimió Kessinger Publ. LLC, 2010. 220 pp. ISBN 1120962439.
- 1894, Minnesota Botanical Studies. Ed. Minneapolis: Harrison & Smith, State Printers. Vols. 1, 2, 3. 1.081 pp.
- 1898, The orientation of the plant egg and its ecological significance. Ed. University of Chicago Press. 23 pp.
- 1901, Some considerations on the nature, organization and work of the modern botanical institute. Ed. The Pioneer Press. 27 pp.
