= Juan de Fuca Marine Trail =

Wilderness hiking trail on Vancouver Island, Canada

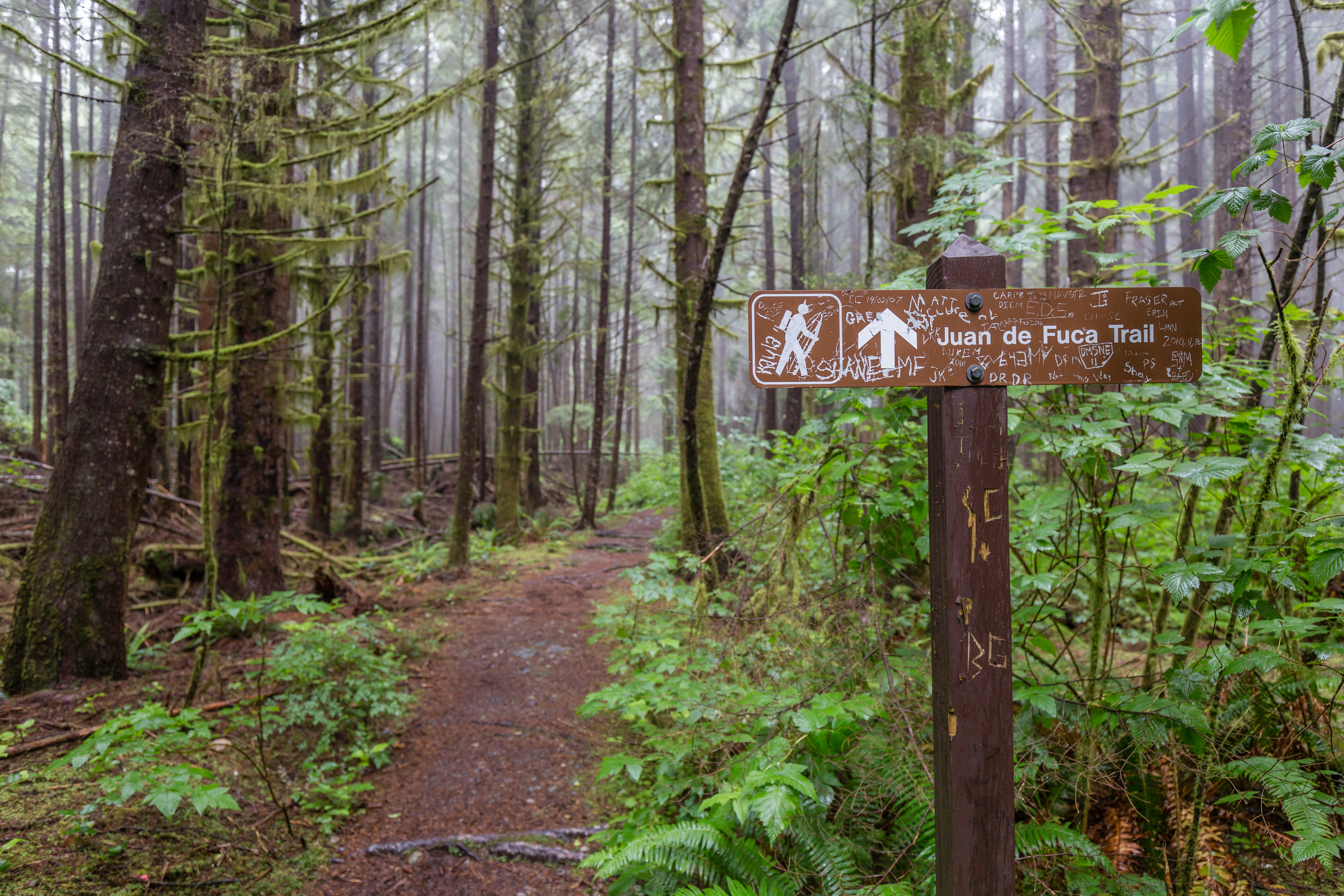
- Signage for Juan de Fuca trail near Sombrio Beach
- Length: 39.9 km (25 mi)
- Location: Canada
- Use: Hiking
- Elevation gain/loss: 1,828 m (5,997 ft)
- Difficulty: Medium
Route diagram

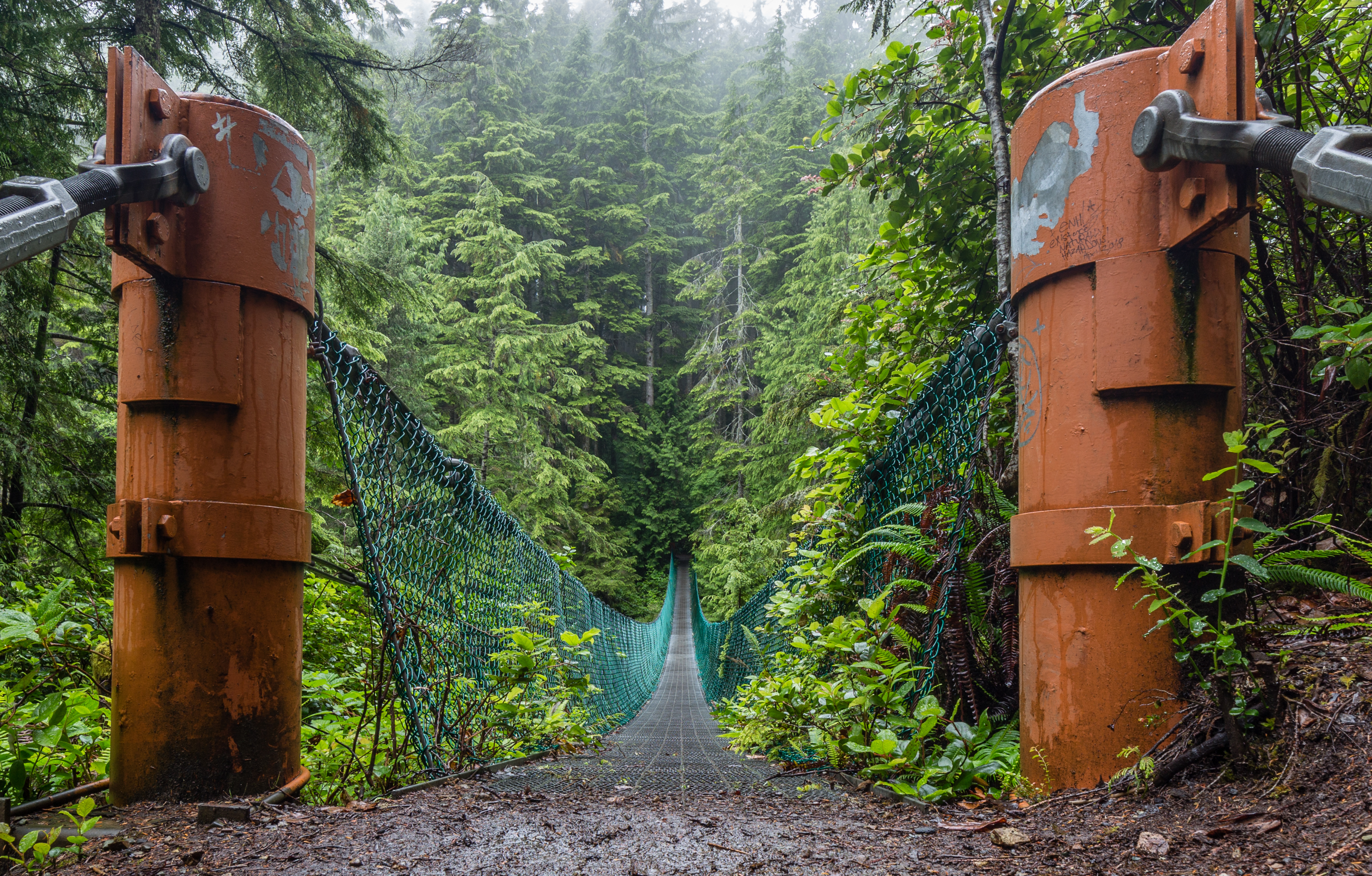
Suspension bridge at Loss Creek on the trail

The Juan de Fuca Marine Trail is a rugged 47 kilometres (29 mi) wilderness hiking trail located within Juan de Fuca Provincial Park along the southwestern coast of Vancouver Island, British Columbia, Canada. The trail stretches from China Beach, 35 kilometres (22 mi) west of Sooke, to Botanical Beach, just outside Port Renfrew.

Panoramic views of the coastline, Juan de Fuca Strait and the Olympic Mountains can be seen from many points along this rainforest trail. Lucky are those who spot a pod of whales, but it is not uncommon to view sea lions, bald eagles, herons and other wildlife. It is a trail of moderate difficulty.

The trail can be hiked in part, as a day hike, or backpacked in its entirety in four to six days. Unlike the longer West Coast Trail (75 kilometres (47 mi)), the Juan de Fuca Trail does not require a reservation; however, there is a backcountry camping fee of $10 per person/per night. It is also suggested to plan ahead if travelling with a large group. Some campsites are quite small and so arriving early to guarantee a spot is highly recommended.

== Main trailheads ==
- China Beach
- Sombrio Beach
- Parkinson Creek
- Botanical Beach

Each is car-accessible and has a parking lot.

== Intermediate trailheads ==
- Mystic Beach
- Bear Beach
- Magdalena Point
- Chin Beach

Each is accessible by parking along Highway 14 and hiking down an unmarked side trail.

== Establishment ==
The Juan de Fuca Marine Trail was created by Parks Canada, originally intended to be part of the Trans Canada Trail. The work was done by Island Green Forestry. Control was given over to BC Parks. In 2001 the B.C. government claimed the trail was built to honour the 1994 Commonwealth Games, but that is debatable.

== Threat to the integrity of the trail ==
In January 2007, the provincial B.C. Liberal government removed 500 hectares (1,200 acres) of land from tree farm licences (TFLs) on the southwestern coast of Vancouver Island to allow Western Forest Products (WFP) to sell the land for residential development. Despite a subsequent report by the provincial auditor general condemning the decision as having been made "without sufficient regard for the public interest", the government stood by the move.

As a result of the TFL deletions, Vancouver-based businessman Ender Ilkay purchased 236 hectares (580 acres) of land from WFP and subsequently proposed a 257-cabin resort bordering 12 km of the Juan de Fuca Trail. The project faced broad opposition from citizens, community groups, environmentalists, and First Nations.

In September 2011, the Capital Regional District (CRD) voted to deny the developer's rezoning application, effectively blocking the project.
