= China Beach (British Columbia) =

Beach in British Columbia, Canada

Coordinates: 48°25′00″N 124°05′00″W

China Beach is a beach on the west coast of Vancouver Island, British Columbia, Canada, southeast of the town of Port Renfrew. The name is derived from the former name of Uglow Creek, formerly known as China Creek. The beach was formerly the name of a provincial park, now rescinded. It was amalgamated with two other parks in 1996 to establish Juan de Fuca Provincial Park.

== Photos ==
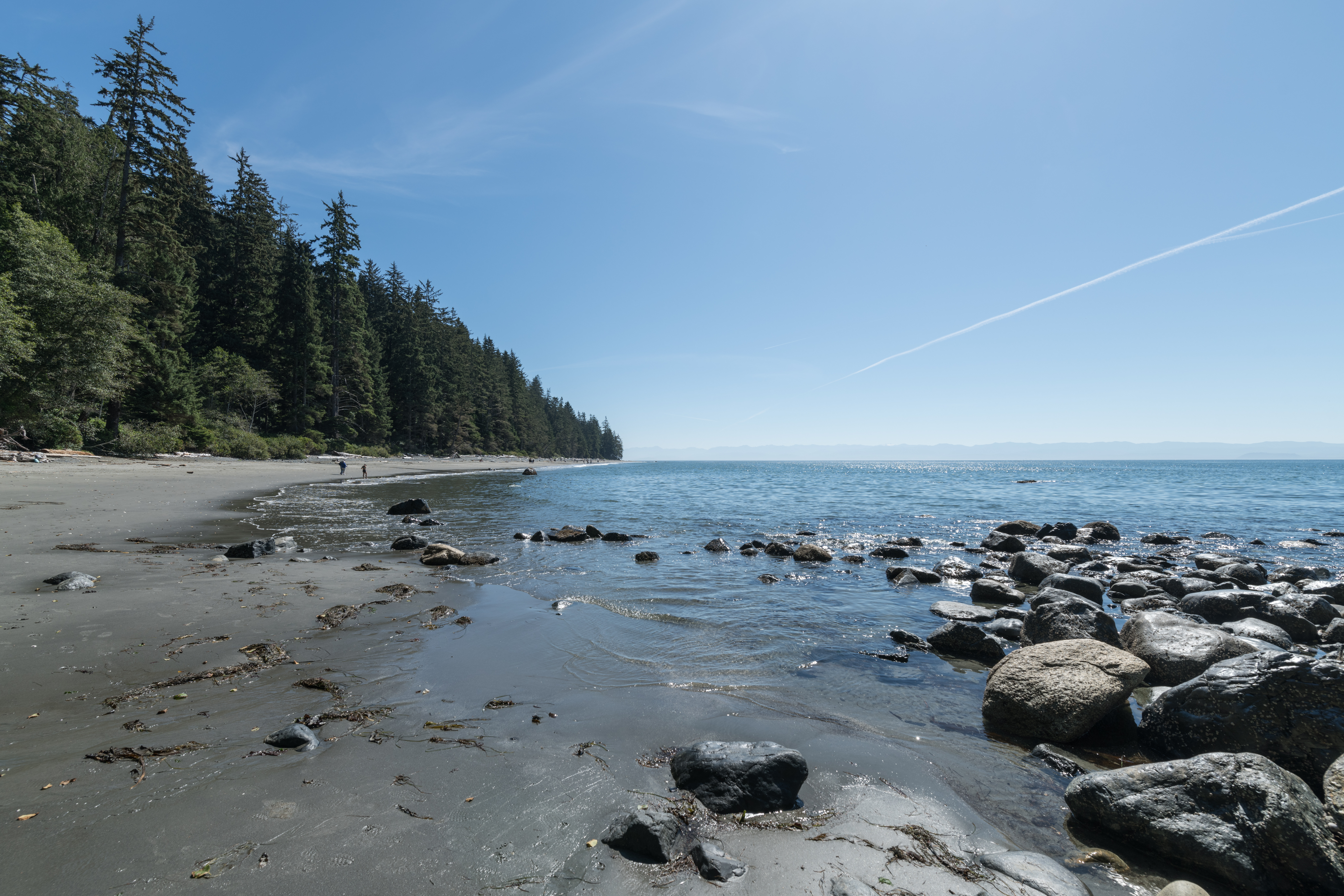
View towards southeast, with the Washington, USA, shoreline visible in the background

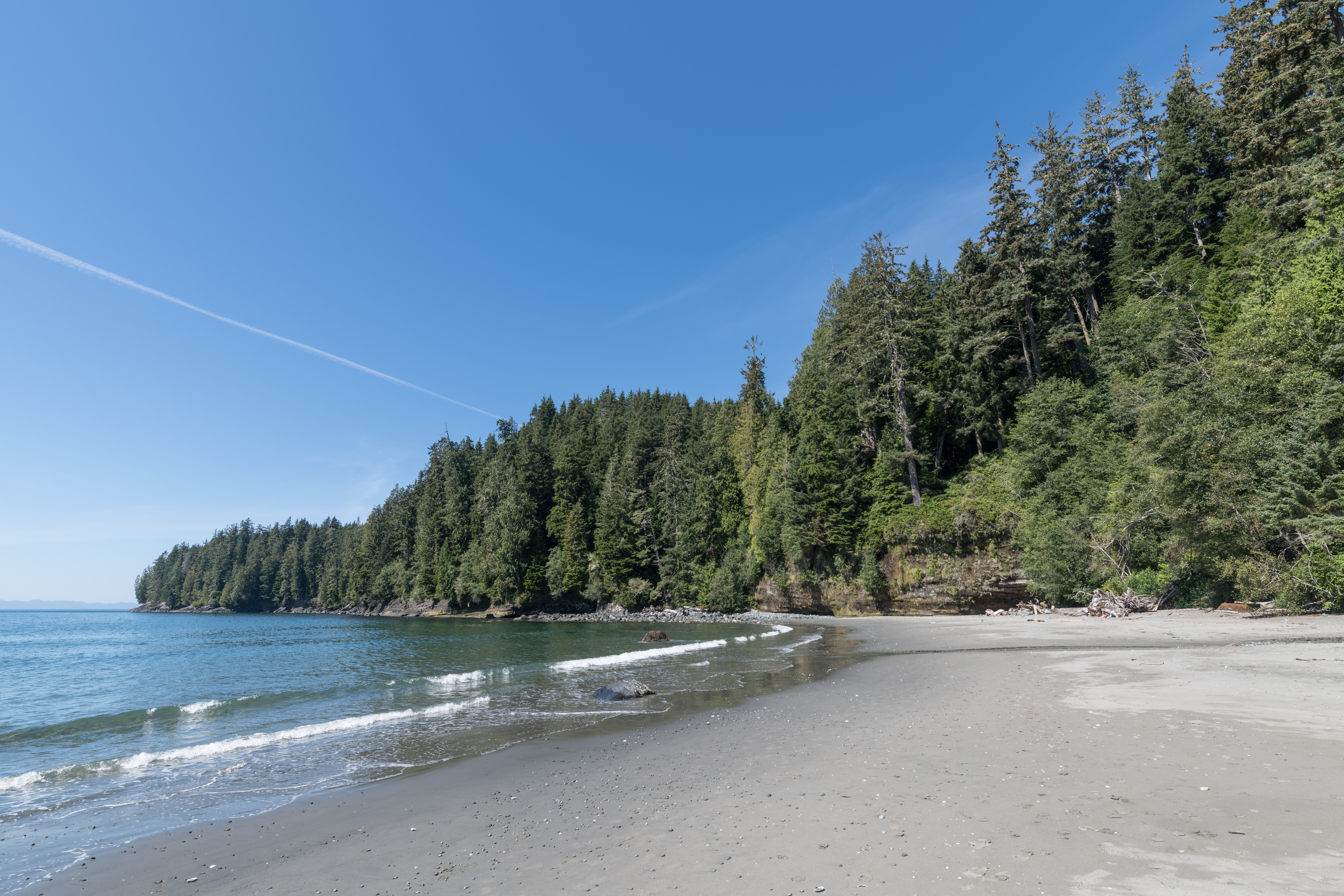
View towards northwest

== See also ==
- Sombrio Beach
- Jordan River
