= Ancient Forest Alliance =

Grassroots environmental organization in British Columbia, Canada

- Established: 2010
- Headquarters: Victoria, British Columbia, Canada
- Members: 7,000
- Administrative director: Joan Varley
- Website: ancientforestalliance.org

The Ancient Forest Alliance is a grassroots environmental organization in British Columbia, Canada. It was founded in January 2010, and is dedicated to protecting British Columbia's old-growth forests in areas where they are scarce, and ensuring sustainable forestry jobs in that province.

== Mission ==
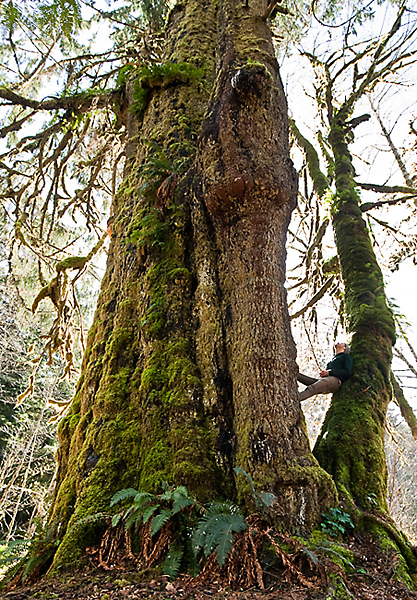
The San Juan Spruce, formerly Canada's largest Sitka spruce, 15km east of Port Renfrew

The objectives of the Ancient Forest Alliance, as stated on their website, are to:

- Undertake a Provincial Old-Growth Strategy that will inventory the old-growth forests in BC and protect them where they are scarce (i.e. Vancouver Island, southern Mainland coast, southern Interior, etc.)
- Ensure the sustainable logging of second-growth forests, which now constitute the majority of forest lands in southern BC.
- End the export of BC raw logs to foreign mills in order to ensure a guaranteed log supply for BC mills and value-added processing facilities.
- Assist in the retooling and development of BC coastal sawmills and value-added facilities to handle second-growth logs.
- Undertake new, democratic land-use planning processes to protect endangered forests based on new First Nations land-use plans, ecosystem-based scientific assessments, and climate mitigation strategies through forest protection.

== History ==
The Ancient Forest Alliance was founded in January 2010 by former Western Canada Wilderness Committee activists Ken Wu, TJ Watt, and Tara Sawatsky, along with old-growth activists Katrina Andres and Brendan Harry from Victoria and Michelle Connolly from Vancouver. The founders were prompted to start the new organization when the Western Canada Wilderness Committee announced in late 2009 that it was both closing its Victoria storefront and reorganizing its Victoria office in a way that they felt reduced its focus on old growth forests. The objective of the Ancient Forest Alliance was to fill a different niche than the Western Canadian Wilderness Committee by focusing specifically on old growth forests and by not obtaining status as a charitable organization, which allows it to either endorse or condemn politicians based on their forest policies. By March 9, 2010, less than two months after its creation, the Ancient Forest Alliance had grown to over 6,000 Facebook members.

== Organization ==
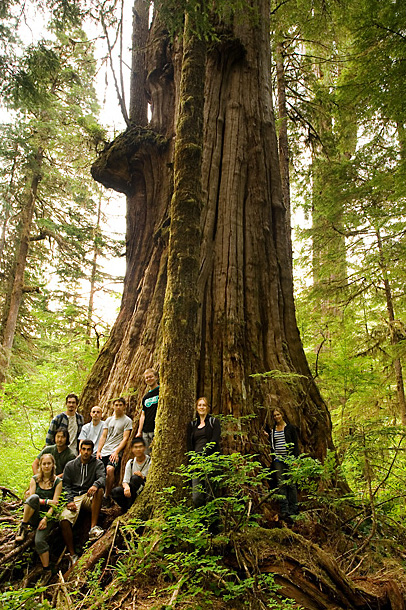
The Tolkien Giant in the unprotected upper Walbran Valley

The Ancient Forest Alliance currently has a board of directors consisting of Victoria conservationists and former Wilderness Committee activists Ken Wu, TJ Watt, Tara Sawatsky, and Vancouver activist Michelle Connolly. Most of the work has been volunteered by the board of directors and supporters, but in March, 2010, the Ancient Forest Alliance launched a fundraising drive so they could hire core staff and pay for campaign costs.

Although the Ancient Forest Alliance is registered as a non-profit society in British Columbia, they have declared that they will not register as a charitable organization. The lack of charitable status makes fundraising more difficult, because they can not issue tax receipts for donations. However, it also allows them to reject or endorse specific political candidates, based on their stance on old growth forests, while charitable organizations cannot take partisan political positions. The Ancient Forest Alliance has said that they will organize in swing ridings to have maximum effectiveness in influencing government policies.

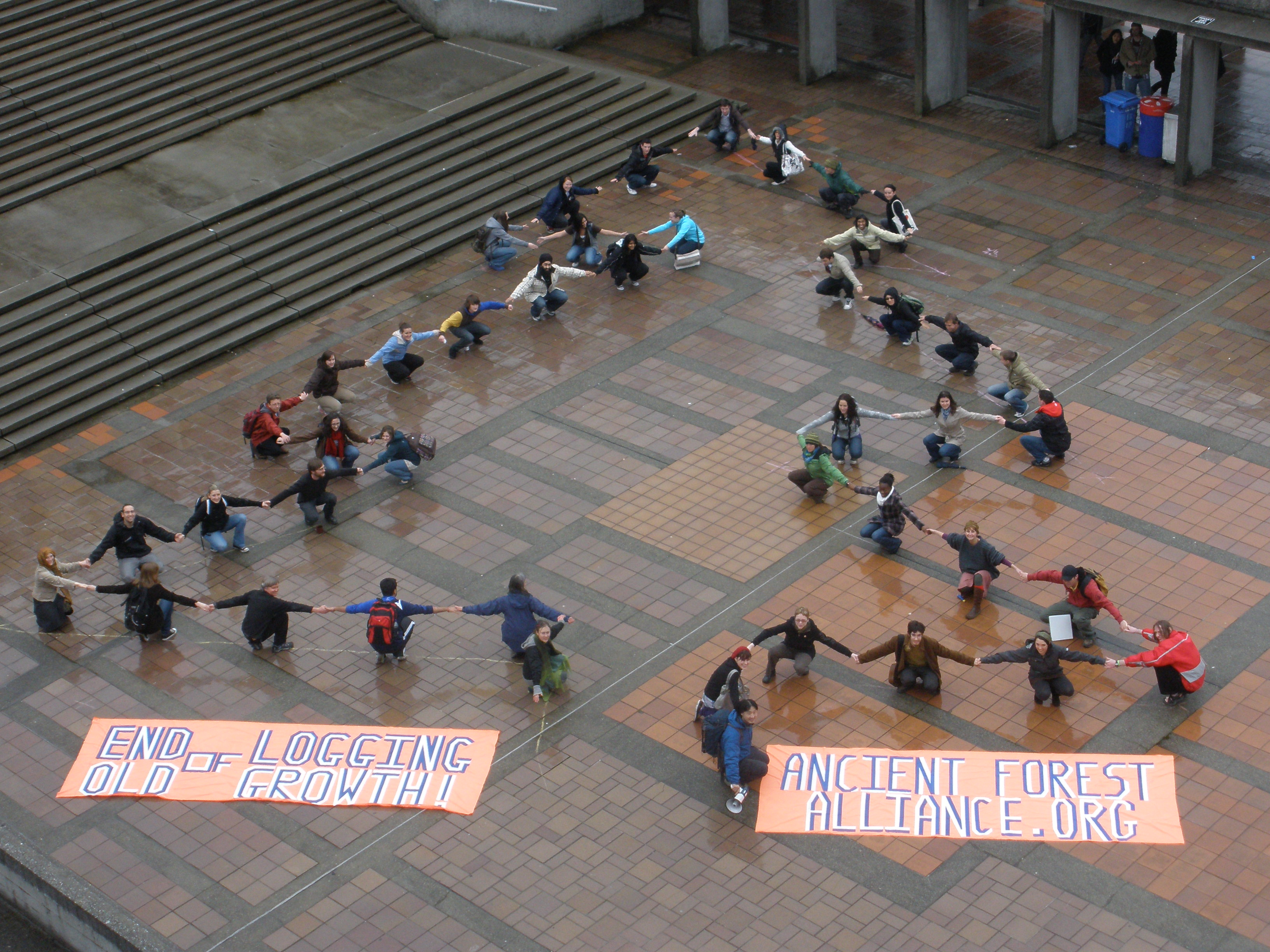
Aerial art event organized by the Ancient Forest Committee at Simon Fraser University

The Ancient Forest Alliance has also stated that they will "help empower, train, and guide new citizens' groups that are going to fight for ancient forests", which they feel will help them run an effective campaign on a much smaller budget than larger environmental organizations. Since 2007, Ancient Forest Committees have been founded in various universities and regions of Vancouver Island and the Lower Mainland of British Columbia, including the University of British Columbia, Simon Fraser University, and the University of Victoria. These Ancient Forest Committees are autonomous, volunteer-run organizations that are independent from the Ancient Forest Alliance, but endorse its goals and strategies, and collaborate on certain events such as rallies, hiking trips, and activist training gatherings.

== Campaigns ==
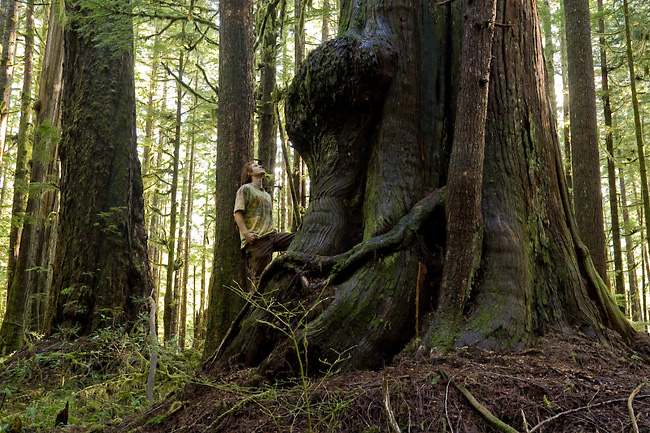
Photographer TJ Watt in Avatar Grove

Documenting ancient forests and giant trees

The Ancient Forest Alliance has stated that they will "explore and document endangered ancient forests, record-sized heritage trees, and areas destroyed by old-growth logging." Photographer TJ Watt has been exploring and documenting old growth forests and giant trees for the Ancient Forest Alliance.

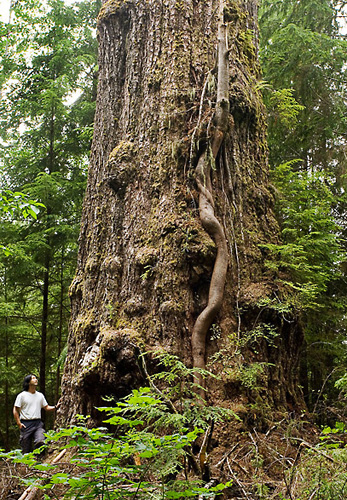
Red Creek Fir, one of the largest known Douglas-firs on earth, is located 15 km (9.3 mi) from Port Renfrew, British Columbia.

Protecting the Red Creek Douglas fir trees

The approximately 1000-year old Red Creek Fir is 73.8 m (242 ft) tall and 4.2 m (13 ft 9 in) wide, is located near Port Renfrew on Vancouver Island and is one of the largest Douglas-firs in the world. (In 2010, it was thought to be the world's largest.) In February 2010 the Ancient Forest Alliance announced that they had discovered new logging tape within a few hundred metres of the Red Creek Fir, and that they feared it might soon be surrounded by a clearcut, making it susceptible to blowdown and reducing its tourism value. The Ministry of Forests has stated that the area immediately surrounding the Red Creek Fir is protected from logging, and that there are no plans to log the surrounding area in the immediate future. TimberWest, which owns the surrounding area, has confirmed this, stating that the logging tape does not necessarily mean that it will be logged, and that they are not planning on logging the area within the next year or two. The Red Creek Fir is an important tourist attraction for the nearby town of Port Renfrew, according to the local Chamber of Commerce. TimberWest has said that they recognize the value of the tree, and are looking at improving access to it for tourists. The Ancient Forest Alliance installed a new sign at the Red Creek Fir, and were asking the British Columbia government to establish a Provincial Heritage Trees designation that will identify and protect the 100 largest and oldest specimens of each of the province's tree species.

The Alliance helped to publicize the issue of clearcutting of old-growth forests on Vancouver Island with a September 2016 article by Harley Rustad on their web site about that same Red Creek Fir tree, which by then, had been named Big Lonely Doug and declared to be Canada's second largest Douglas-fir tree. According to the Rustad article, the tree had been saved in 2011 by surveyor Dennis Cronin in an area that was scheduled for clearcutting. (Cutblock number 7190, twelve hectares on the north bank of the Gordon River.) Originally published by The Walrus, where the article won a silver National Magazine Award (2018), the story helped to re-ignite interest in the clearcutting issue and attracted additional coverage by the major news media. Several publications subsequently ran similar articles about clear-cutting, featuring photos of the Big Lonely Doug tree in an area with no other remaining old-growth trees. Most recently, in early September 2019, the Toronto Star published a feature about the issue, titled "He lived in a forest for hundreds of Years, Now he must live in a clear-cut." Doug had become a tourist attraction by then, marked on Google Maps.

The Alliance has remained active in the clearcutting issue on Vancouver Island. In April 2019, it was one of the groups lobbying to prevent additional logging of a 109 hectare old-growth forest adjacent to the Juan de Fuca Provincial Park in the Port Renfrew area, known as the Tall Tree Capital of Canada. In May 2019, the logging plan was postponed by the provincial government.

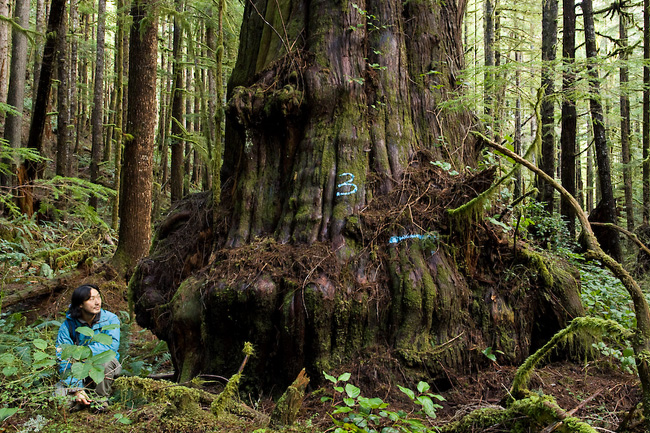
A giant cedar in Avatar Grove, painted for felling

Protecting Avatar Grove

The Ancient Forest Alliance is campaigning to protect a 10-hectare stand of 80-metre tall old growth Douglas-fir and western red cedar that is 15 minutes outside of Port Renfrew on Vancouver Island, Canada. It was discovered by TJ Watt and has been nicknamed Avatar Grove. The Ancient Forest Alliance claims that this is one of the most spectacular and most accessible stands of ancient trees in a wilderness setting that remains on southern Vancouver Island, and that it is one of the only examples in the region of old growth forest on a valley bottom. One of the giant cedars in Avatar Grove has numerous huge burls and has been dubbed "Canada's gnarliest tree". The Teal-Jones Group has cutting rights for the area, and while the Ministry of Forests reports that logging is prohibited in a portion of Avatar Grove, the Ancient Forest Alliance maintains that the majority is still unprotected. John Cash, president of the Port Renfrew Chamber of Commerce, has said that he supports the protection of Avatar Grove because of its potential for increasing tourism in the area. On March 28, 2010, the Ancient Forest Alliance organized a trip to take volunteers, community members, and media to see Avatar Grove.

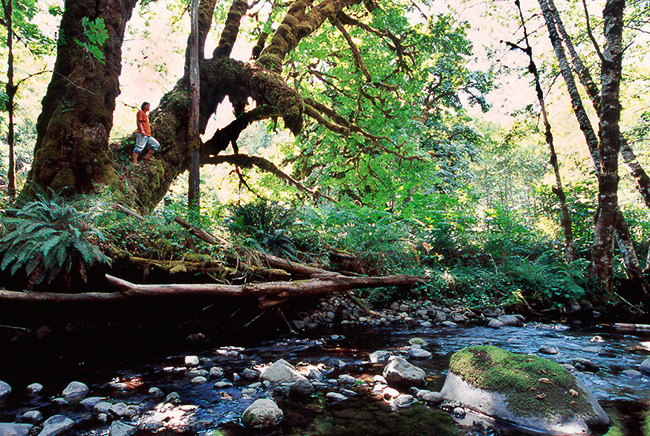
An old growth big leaf maple growing by Sutton Creek, near Lake Cowichan, British Columbia

Three-step program for the Post-Avatar Blues

In February 2010, the Ancient Forest Alliance announced their three-step program to cure the Post-Avatar Blues, a depression experienced by some viewers of the blockbuster film Avatar when they have to return to the drab reality of Earth after experiencing the wondrous ecology of the fictional moon Pandora. The Ancient Forest Alliance maintained that the ancient forests of British Columbia and the wildlife that inhabits them are just as spectacular as the forests of Pandora, and suggested the following three-step program to cure movie-goers of their depression: "Get out and experience nature, take action to defend nature, and get others to do the same".

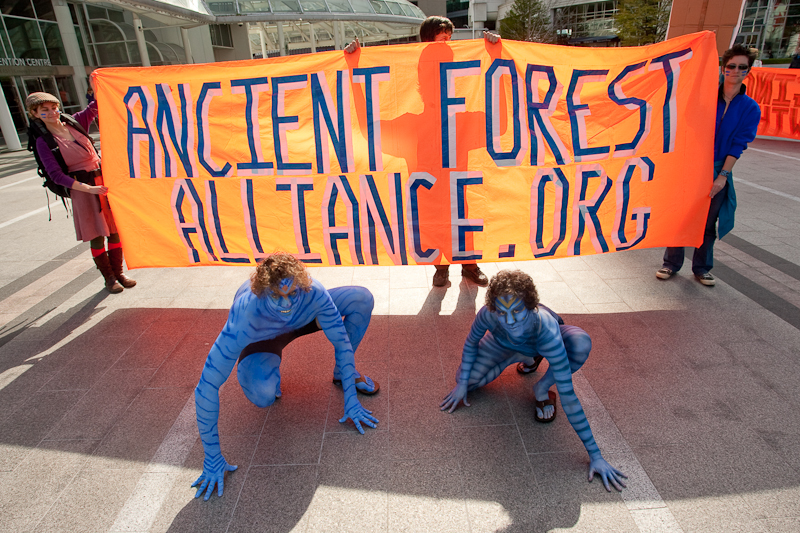
Rally for old growth forests in Vancouver, British Columbia, on March 27, 2010

Avatar-themed rally to protect old growth forests

The Ancient Forest Alliance has organized one rally, which was held in downtown Vancouver on March 27, 2010. About 100 supporters marched from Canada Place to the Vancouver Art Gallery, making demands for the BC government to protect endangered old growth forests and support sustainable logging of second growth forests. The rally borrowed images from the blockbuster hit Avatar, with numerous people painted as characters from that movie.

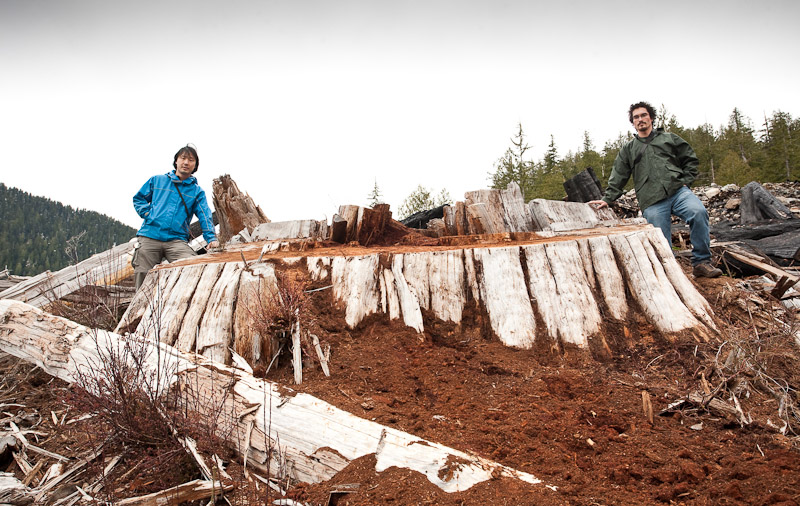
A red cedar stump measuring 15 ft (4.6 m) in diameter near Port Renfrew

Canada's Biggest Stumps competition

In April 2010, members of the Ancient Forest Alliance discovered some giant stumps near Port Renfrew, British Columbia. The stumps were from recently cut old growth red cedar, and measured between 3.7 and 4.6 metres in diameter. The stumps were on crown land being logged by the Surrey-based Teal-Jones Group. This discovery prompted the Ancient Forest Alliance to launch "Canada's Biggest Stumps Competition", and they created a Facebook site where people can upload their pictures of giant stumps.

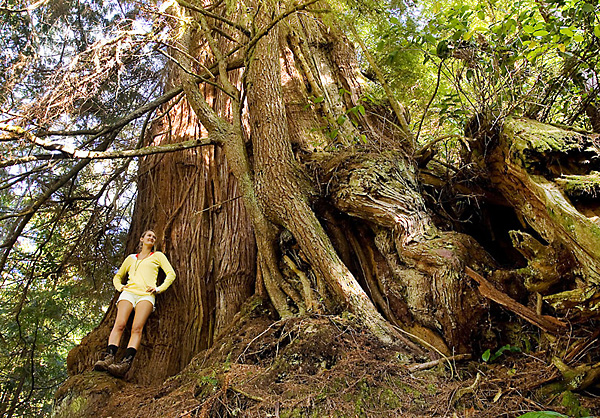
The Refugee Tree, the largest red cedar in the Capital Regional District, British Columbia

Creating new regional parks in the Capital Regional District

In May 2010, the Parks department of the Capital Regional District of southern Vancouver Island hosted a number of public input meetings to determine, among other things, candidates for new protected areas in the region. The Ancient Forest Alliance praised the Capital Regional District for considering public input, and recommended several areas of old growth forest for protection in regional parks. The areas that the Ancient Forest Alliance wants the Capital Regional District to protect include the Red Creek Fir (the largest Douglas-fir on earth), the San Juan Spruce (the largest Sitka spruce in Canada), and Avatar Grove, all of which are on public land.

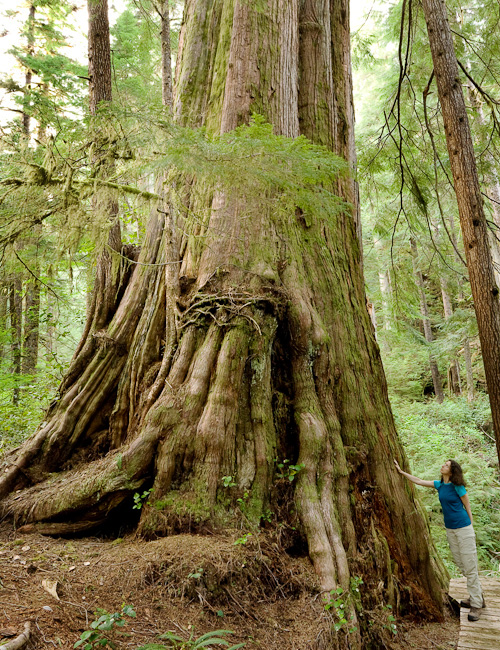
The Castle Giant growing in the unprotected upper Walbran Valley

Organizing in swing ridings

On April 9, 2010, the Ancient Forest Alliance led media representatives to see a 400-year-old Douglas-fir growing in the Oak Bay-Gordon Head provincial electoral district in order to launch their campaign in that swing riding. The group declared that they will focus their campaign on the dozen or so swing ridings in British Columbia to force the BC government to protect endangered old-growth forests, ensure the sustainable logging of second-growth forest, ban raw log exports, and assist in retooling of old-growth sawmills for value-added wood manufacturing. The Ancient Forest Alliance is not a charity, and is therefore permitted to condemn or endorse politicians and political parties. On May 14, the group held a gift-giving ceremony at BC Liberal MLA Ida Chong's office in Oak Bay. Ida Chong won the last election by a 2% margin.

Fundraising

On May 8, 2010, the Ancient Forest Alliance held a fundraiser at Tzvi's Place in Vancouver. Numerous musicians played at the event, and all proceeds went to the Ancient Forest Alliance, and to support local musicians. The Big Tree Tour is another fundraiser for the Ancient Forest Alliance, which is scheduled to happen from June 3 to 6, 2010. Eight riders will take pledges from donors, and intend to cycle 260 km through southern Vancouver Island to visit some of the largest trees on the planet.

=== Cathedral Grove ===
In 2020, Ancient Forest Alliance campaigned for the British Columbia government to protect old growth forest in Cathedral Grove in MacMillan Provincial Park. The organization wanted the government to purchase the private land where forest in located. The forest contains many 800-year-old Douglas firs which support biodiversity and operate as carbon sinks, but they are also highly valued by loggers.
