= Pacific Marine Circle Route =

Route information
- Length: 263 km (163 mi)
- Component highways: Highway 1, Highway 14, Highway 18, Pacific Marine Road, Shore Road

Location
- Country: Canada
- Province: British Columbia

Highway system
- British Columbia provincial highways

The Pacific Marine Circle Route is a 263-kilometre (163 mi) marked scenic loop road through southern Vancouver Island in British Columbia, Canada. The route is composed of Highway 14, Pacific Marine Road, Shore Road, Highway 18, and a segment of the Trans-Canada Highway.

The Pacific Marine Circle Route was established by the British Columbia Ministry of Tourism, Arts and Culture with the promise of an increase in tourist travel in southern Vancouver Island. It is one of British Columbia's 12 Circle Routes scattered throughout the province.

== Route ==
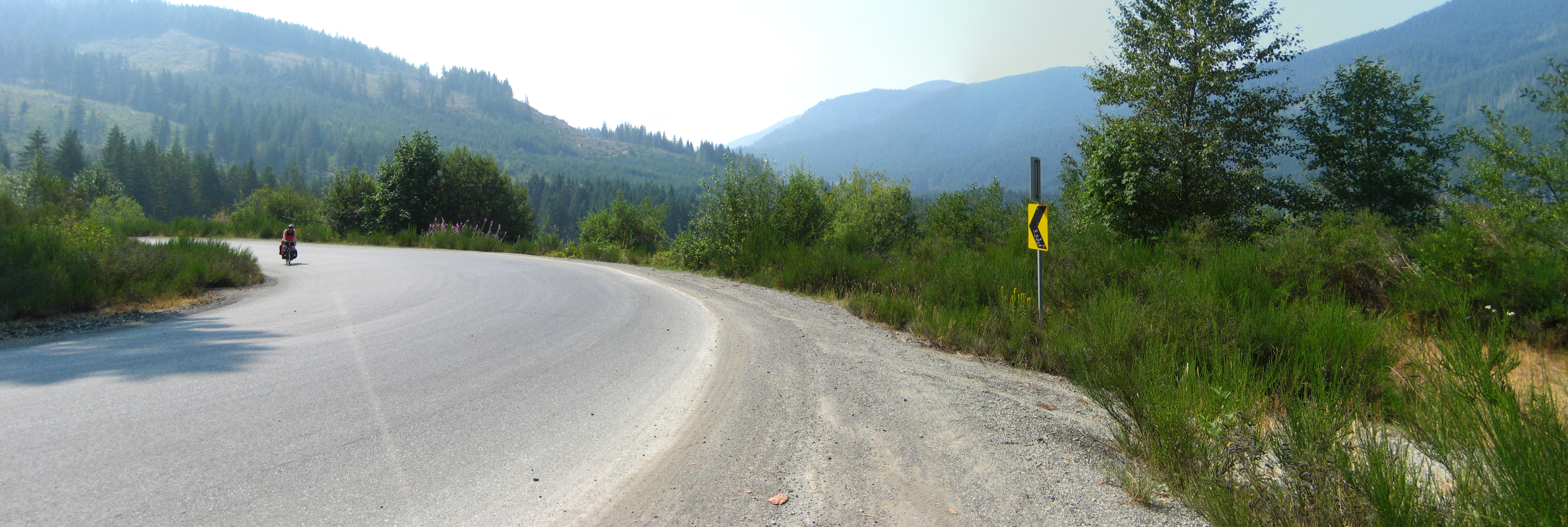
Pacific Marine Road between Port Renfrew and Lake Cowichan

Clockwise, the route heads south from Malahat, passes through Goldstream Provincial Park then briefly east to Langford, south and west to Sooke, west to Port Renfrew, north and east to Lake Cowichan, east and south to Duncan, southeast to Mill Bay, then south back to Malahat. The route can also be travelled in the opposite direction and started or finished at any points.

== Points of Interest ==
- Cowichan Lake
- French Beach Provincial Park
- Goldstream Provincial Park
- Jordan River
- Juan de Fuca Provincial Park
- Pacific Rim National Park Reserve
- Sooke Basin

== See also ==
- San Juan Valley
- Seymour Range
