= Port San Juan =

Inlet on Vancouver Island, British Columbia, Canada

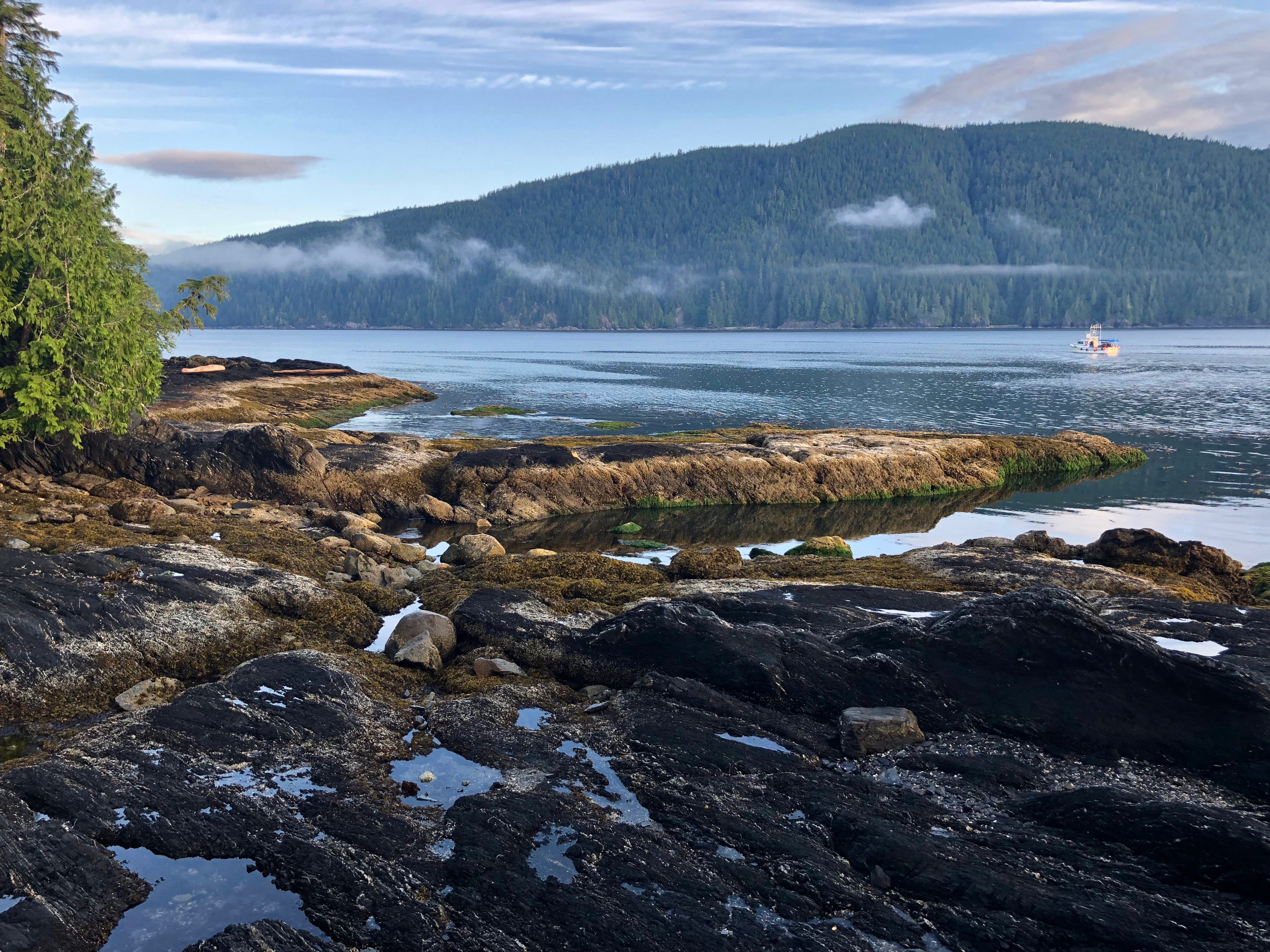
- Port San Juan from Port Renfrew

- Location in British Columbia Port San Juan (British Columbia) Port San Juan (Canada)
- Location: Vancouver Island, British Columbia
- Coordinates: 48°33′17″N 124°26′53″W
- Ocean/sea sources: Strait of Juan de Fuca; Pacific Ocean
- Settlements: Port Renfrew; Gordon River 2

Port San Juan is an inlet along the Pacific coast of Vancouver Island in British Columbia, Canada. It was formed from the San Juan and Leech River faults which flank the northern and southern slopes of the San Juan Valley. The San Juan and Gordon rivers empty into the inlet from the northeast.

The town of Port Renfrew is located on the southern shore of Port San Juan, near the outlet of the San Juan River. The inlet can be accessed from Victoria via Highway 14, from Lake Cowichan via the Pacific Marine Circle Road, or by boat from the Strait of Juan de Fuca.

== History ==
=== Early Spanish expeditions ===
The First Nations of Vancouver Island have a legend of a Spanish trading schooner which arrived on the Island's southwestern coast in 1777. The Spanish anchored in the harbour and traded with the Nitinat Natives. The Spanish discovered gold in the San Juan River and tried to recover the gold. The Nitinat Natives defeated the Spanish expedition. Two Spanish women were taken as slaves. The women were later released to another Spanish expedition who discovered them. The later expedition inadvertently infected the Nitinat Natives with smallpox. There is some evidence to support this story. Spanish ships such as the Santiago investigated the west coast in the 1700s. There are also records of attacks on Spanish by First Nations. This is the first alleged discovery of gold in the San Juan River.

== See also ==
- Pacheedaht First Nation
- Juan de Fuca Provincial Park
