= Harley Rustad =

Canadian writer

- Born: 1985 (age 40–41)
- Website: https://www.harleyrustad.com

Harley Rustad is a Canadian journalist, magazine editor, and author of Lost in the Valley of Death: A Story of Obsession and Danger in the Himalayas and Big Lonely Doug: The Story of One of Canada's Last Great Trees.

== Early life ==
Rustad was born on Salt Spring Island, British Columbia, Canada, where he spent the first few months of his life in a tent while his parents built their home. He lives in Toronto, Ontario.

== Journalism career ==
Rustad has been an editor and writer at The Walrus, a Canadian general interest magazine, since 2014. His writing has appeared in publications including Outside, The Walrus, The Globe and Mail, Geographical, The Guardian, and CNN. He is a faculty editor at the Banff Centre for Arts and Creativity's Mountain and Wilderness Writing Residency. He was awarded Editor Grand Prix at the 2024 National Magazine Awards: "Harley Rustad's commitment to tackling in-depth investigations and features stands out. Rustad's contributions to The Walrus have reinforced its position as one of Canada's leading homes for thoughtful, impactful journalism."

=== Big Lonely Doug ===
His first book, Big Lonely Doug: The Story of One of Canada's Last Great Trees, a nonfiction book published in 2018 is about the second-largest Douglas fir in Canada that was a saved by a logger who wrapped green LEAVE TREE ribbon around its trunk, and the fight to protect old-growth forests in British Columbia. The tree, Big Lonely Doug, is growing in the middle of a clear cut near Port Renfrew, British Columbia. The book started as a magazine article in The Walrus. The book was nominated for the 2018 Shaughnessy Cohen Prize for Political Writing, the 2019 Roderick Haig-Brown Regional Prize, and the 2018 Banff Mountain Book Competition.

=== Lost in the Valley of Death ===
His second book, Lost in the Valley of Death: A Story of Obsession and Danger in the Himalayas, was published in 2022 and investigates the 2016 disappearance of Justin Alexander Shetler in the Parvati Valley, India. It was nominated for a 2022 Banff Mountain Book Award and a Crime Writers of Canada Award, was a Canadian bestseller, and appeared on the cover of the February 13, 2022, New York Times Book Review. Lost in the Valley of Death won two awards at the 2023 Poland Mountain Book Awards and a 2023 US Religion News Association Award.

== Port Renfrew Writers Retreat ==
In 2019, Rustad founded the Port Renfrew Writers Retreat on Vancouver Island, British Columbia, Canada, a non-fiction writers retreat focused on nature writing.

== Awards and honours ==
- 2023 Mountain Literature Awards, Poland (winner non-fiction category and winner Grand Prix) for Lost in the Valley of Death, Polish translation
- 2023 Religion News Association Award (winner) for Lost in the Valley of Death
- 2023 Crime Writers of Canada Award (finalist) for Lost in the Valley of Death
- 2022 Banff Mountain Book Award (finalist) for Lost in the Valley of Death
- 2022 CBC Best Canadian Non-fiction Books of the Year for Lost in the Valley of Death
- 2018 Globe and Mail Best Books of the Year for Big Lonely Doug
- 2018 CBC Best Canadian Non-fiction Books of the Year for Big Lonely Doug
- 2018 Shaughnessy Cohen Prize for Political Writing (finalist) for Big Lonely Doug
- 2018 Banff Mountain Book Award (finalist) for Big Lonely Doug
- 2019 Roderick Haig-Brown Regional Prize (finalist) for Big Lonely Doug
- 2016 National Magazine Award (silver) "Big Lonely Doug" published in The Walrus.
- 2015 National Magazine Award (honourable mention) for "Where the Streets Have No Names" published in The Walrus

== Bibliography ==
- Big Lonely Doug: The Story of One of Canada’s Last Great Trees. House of Anansi Press. 2018. ISBN 978-1487003111
- Lost in the Valley of Death: A Story of Obsession and Danger in the Himalayas. Harper. 2022. ISBN 978-0062965967
