= San Juan Valley (Vancouver Island) =

Valley in British Columbia, Canada

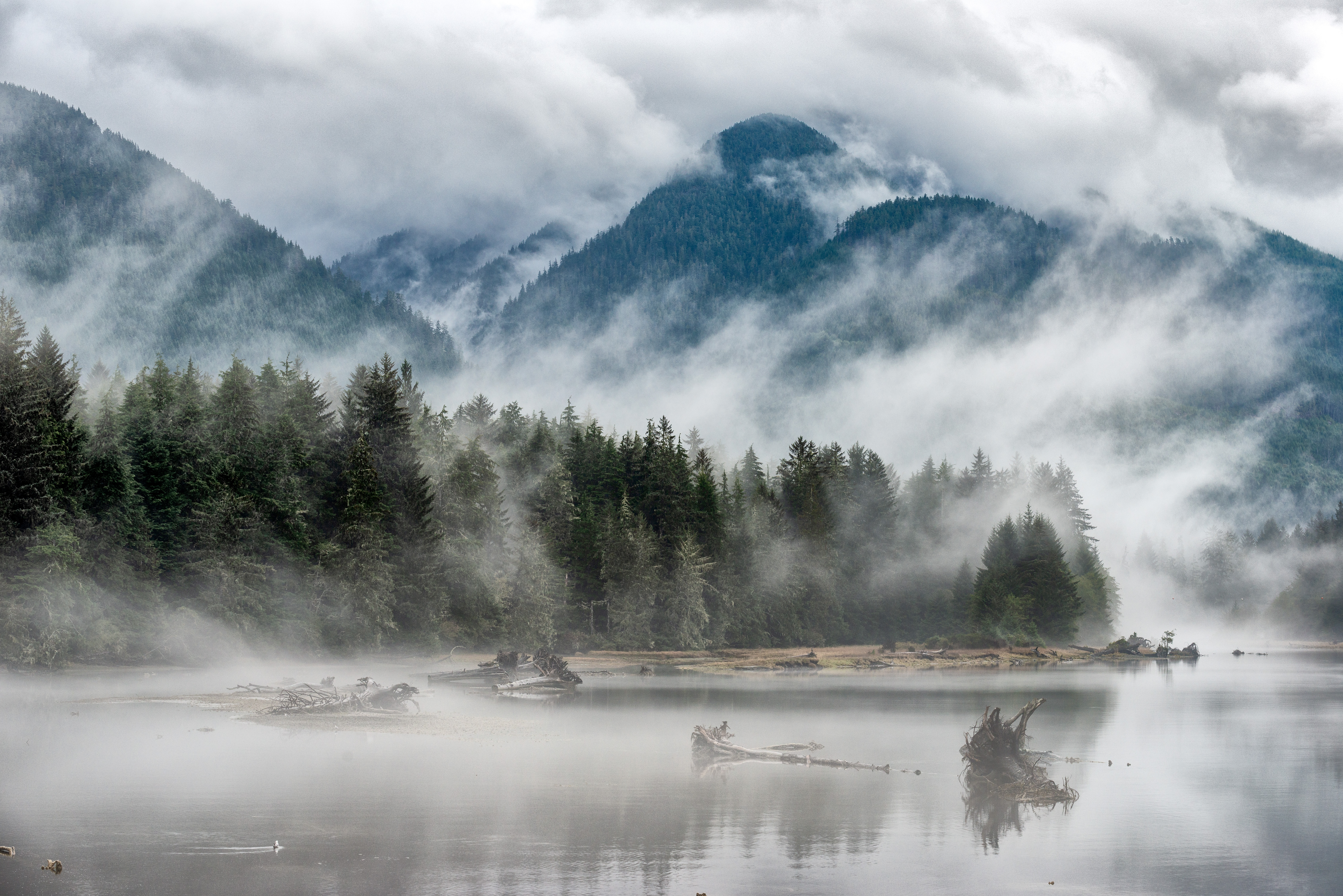
- View up the San Juan Valley from Pacheena Reserve 1

- Location within British Columbia Location within Capital Regional District
- Length: 32 km (20 mi) East-West
- Width: 3.8 to 7.5 km (2.4 to 4.7 mi)

Geography
- District: Capital Regional District
- Coordinates: 48°36′0″N 124°13′0″W
- Traversed by: Pacific Marine Road
- Rivers: San Juan River
- Interactive map of San Juan Valley

The San Juan Valley is a small valley located in the Capital Regional District of Vancouver Island in British Columbia, Canada.

The only permanent settlements in the valley are Port Renfrew and those of the Pacheedaht First Nation.

== History ==
The First Nations of Vancouver Island have a legend of a Spanish trading schooner which arrived on the Island's southwestern coast in 1777. The Spanish anchored in Port San Juan and traded with the Nitinat Natives. The Spanish discovered gold in the San Juan River and tried to recover the gold. The Nitinat Natives defeated the Spanish expedition. Two Spanish women were taken as slaves. The women were later released to another Spanish expedition who discovered them. The later expedition inadvertently infected the Nitinat Natives with smallpox. There is some evidence to support this story. Spanish ships such as the Santiago investigated the west coast in the 1700s. There are also records of attacks on Spanish by First Nations. This is the first alleged discovery of gold in the San Juan River.

== Geography ==
The San Juan Valley is separated from Cowichan Valley, to the north, by the Seymour Range, and from the Loss Creek and Jordan River valleys, to the south, by an unnamed mountain ridge. The valley is bisected by the San Juan River, which flows west to east and empties into Port San Juan. It also contains three small lakes: Fairy Lake, Lizard Lake, and Pixie Lake.

=== Geology ===
The valley sits on what is the remains of the Pacific Rim Terrane, a terrane which was crushed between the Wrangellia to the north and Siletzia to the south. This terrane extends further west to the Pacific Ocean and further east to Victoria.

== Climate ==
The western end of the San Juan Valley has an Oceanic climate (Köppen: Cfb) due to its close proximity to the Strait of Juan de Fuca. Further inland the valley is characterized by a warm-summer Mediterranean climate (Köppen: Csb).

== Ecology ==
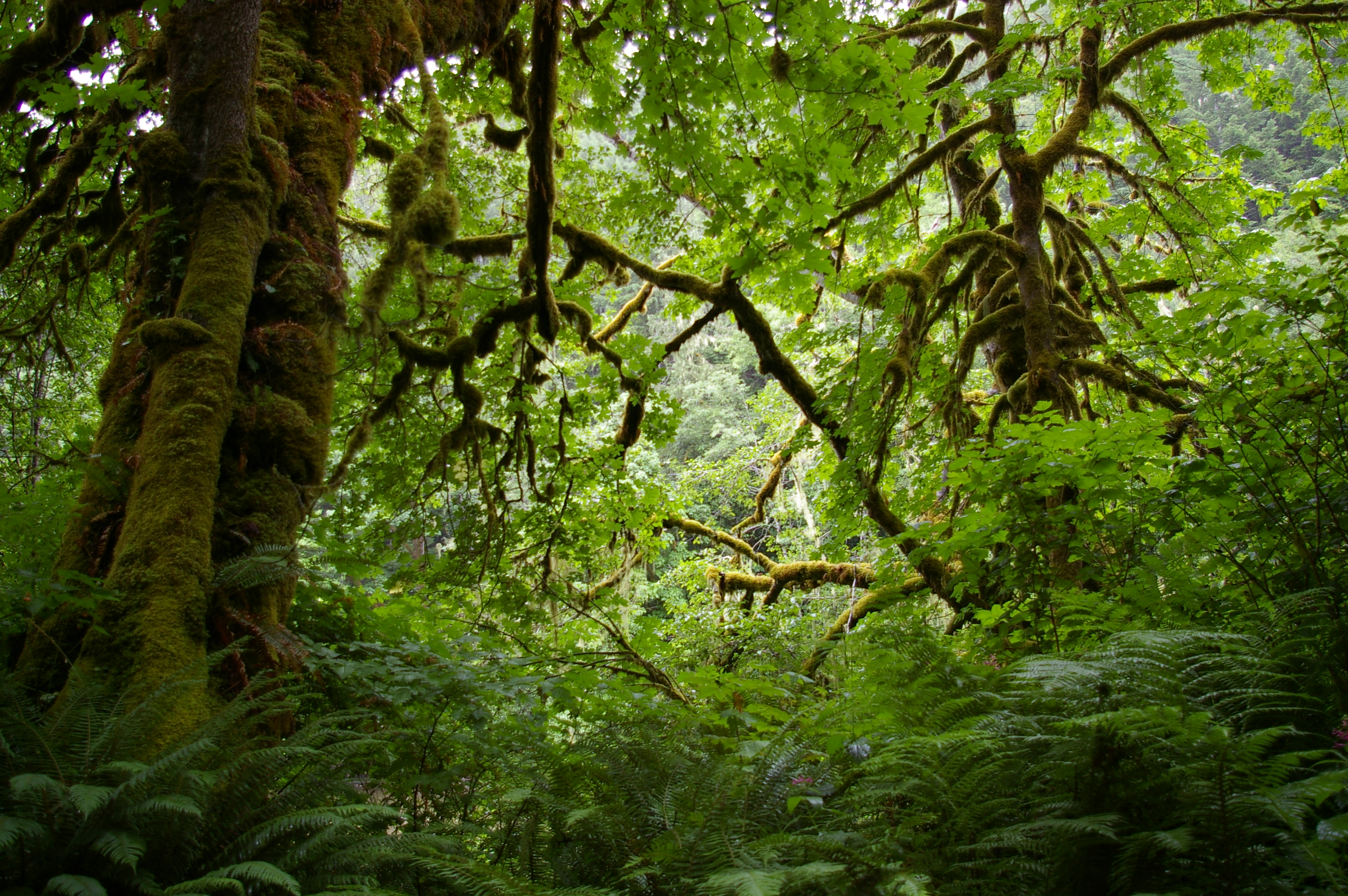
The San Juan Valley hosts a temperate rainforest

The valley lies in a temperate rainforest biome and is home to the coniferous "big trees" associated with British Columbia's coast – western hemlock, western red cedar, Pacific silver fir, yellow cedar, Douglas fir, grand fir, Sitka spruce, and western white pine. It is also characterised by bigleaf maple, red alder, sword fern, and red huckleberry.

The valley is home to some of the largest and oldest remaining patches of old growth forests on Vancouver Island. Trees of note include the Red Creek Fir, the largest Douglas fir in the world, and San Juan Spruce, the former second largest Sitka spruce in the world.

== See also ==
- Pacific Rim National Park Reserve
