= San Juan River (Vancouver Island) =

River on Vancouver Island, British Columbia, Canada

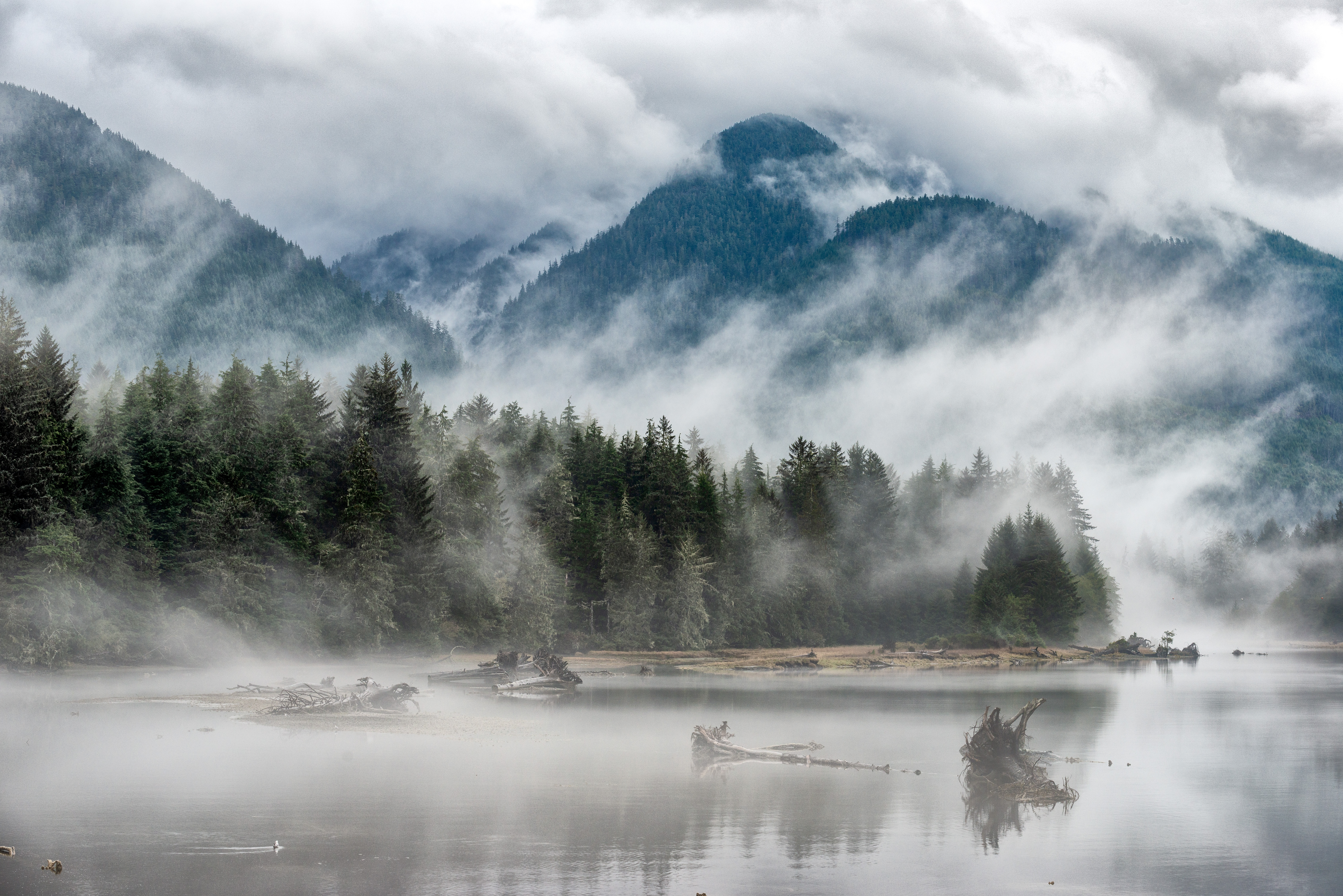
- View up the San Juan River from Pacheena Reserve 1

- Location within British Columbia Location within Canada

Location
- Country: Canada
- Province: British Columbia
- Region: Vancouver Island
- District: Renfrew Land District

Physical characteristics
- Source: Seymour Range
  - coordinates: 48°43′39.5″N 123°59′33″W
  - elevation: 735 m (2,411 ft)
- Mouth: Port San Juan
  - location: Port Renfrew, British Columbia
  - coordinates: 48°33′33″N 124°24′31″W
  - elevation: 0 m (0 ft)

Basin features
- Tributaries
  - left: Harris Creek, Fairy Lake

San Juan River is a river that flows from east to west through southern Vancouver Island in British Columbia, Canada. The river originates in the Seymour Range, flows westward through the San Juan Valley to Port San Juan at Port Renfrew.

== History ==
=== Early Spanish expeditions ===
The First Nations of Vancouver Island have a legend of a Spanish trading schooner which arrived on the Island's southwestern coast in 1777. The Spanish anchored in the harbour and traded with the Nitinat Natives. The Spanish discovered gold in the San Juan River and tried to recover the gold. The Nitinat Natives slaughtered the Spanish expedition. Two Spanish women were taken as slaves. The women were later released to another Spanish expedition who discovered them. The later expedition inadvertently infected the Nitinat Natives with smallpox. There is some evidence to support this story. Spanish ships such as the Santiago investigated the west coast in the 1700s. There are also records of attacks on Spanish by First Nations. This is the first alleged discovery of gold in the San Juan River.

=== Foster's Lost Mine ===
In 1885 an American prospector named Foster found gold in the San Juan River. Foster returned in 1907 to find more gold. Every year Foster returned looking for the gold. He returned year after year because he couldn't find the original spot on the San Juan River. Foster died in 1917 in Salt Lake City. The people of Port Renfrew heard about Foster's search. Many people from Port Renfrew searched all over the San Juan River looking for Foster's old gold site. It was never discovered.

== Course ==
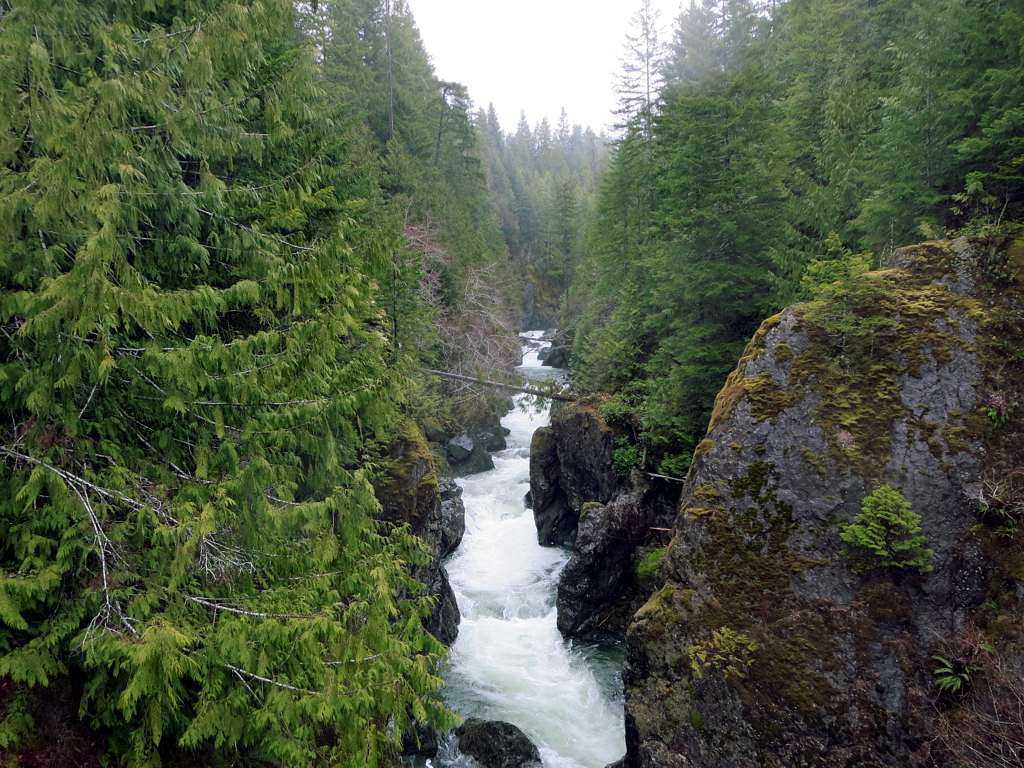
Harris Creek, a major tributary of the San Juan River

The San Juan River's headwaters take drainage from the southern slopes of the Seymour Range. Its largest fork begins at a small unnamed pond in Cowichan Valley Regional District and forms the primary headstream. From here the San Juan River flows southwest into "Pete's Pond" before continuing its descent south. It then enters the Capital Regional District before pooling briefly in a large unnamed pond. The river then continues south before meeting its first named tributary, Clapp Creek. From here the river swings west-southwest, growing considerably in size as continues down the valley. The San Juan River then meets its first major tributary, Fleet River. From here the river winds through a canyon before it opens up into a broad valley. It meets the major tributaries of Lens Creek and Harris Creek before meeting an outlet stream of Fairy Lake. From here the San Juan River meanders considerably and breaks off into a pair of major branches, forming a large estuary. The smaller northern branch meanders west before sharing an outlet to Port San Juan with the Gordon River. The larger southern branch meanders southwest and empties into Port San Juan just north of Port Renfrew.

== Estuary ==
The San Juan River Estuary Ecological Reserve was established on 30 April 1996 in order to conserve the alluvial forest communities of the lower San Juan River and protect the red-listed tooth-leaved monkeyflower, endemic to British Columbia. It is classified as a strict nature reserve (IUCN Category Ia).

The estuary is populated by a variety of trees, including red alder, black cottonwood, Sitka spruce, and western hemlock. Shrubs present in the estuary include salmonberry, stink currant, piggyback plants, lady fern, and deer fern. Wildlife of note that take residence in the estuary include American black bears, Roosevelt elk, North American river otters, bald eagles, and minks.

== See also ==
- List of rivers of British Columbia
- Pacheedaht First Nation
- Red Creek fir
