= San Juan Spruce =

Tree on Vancouver Island, Canada

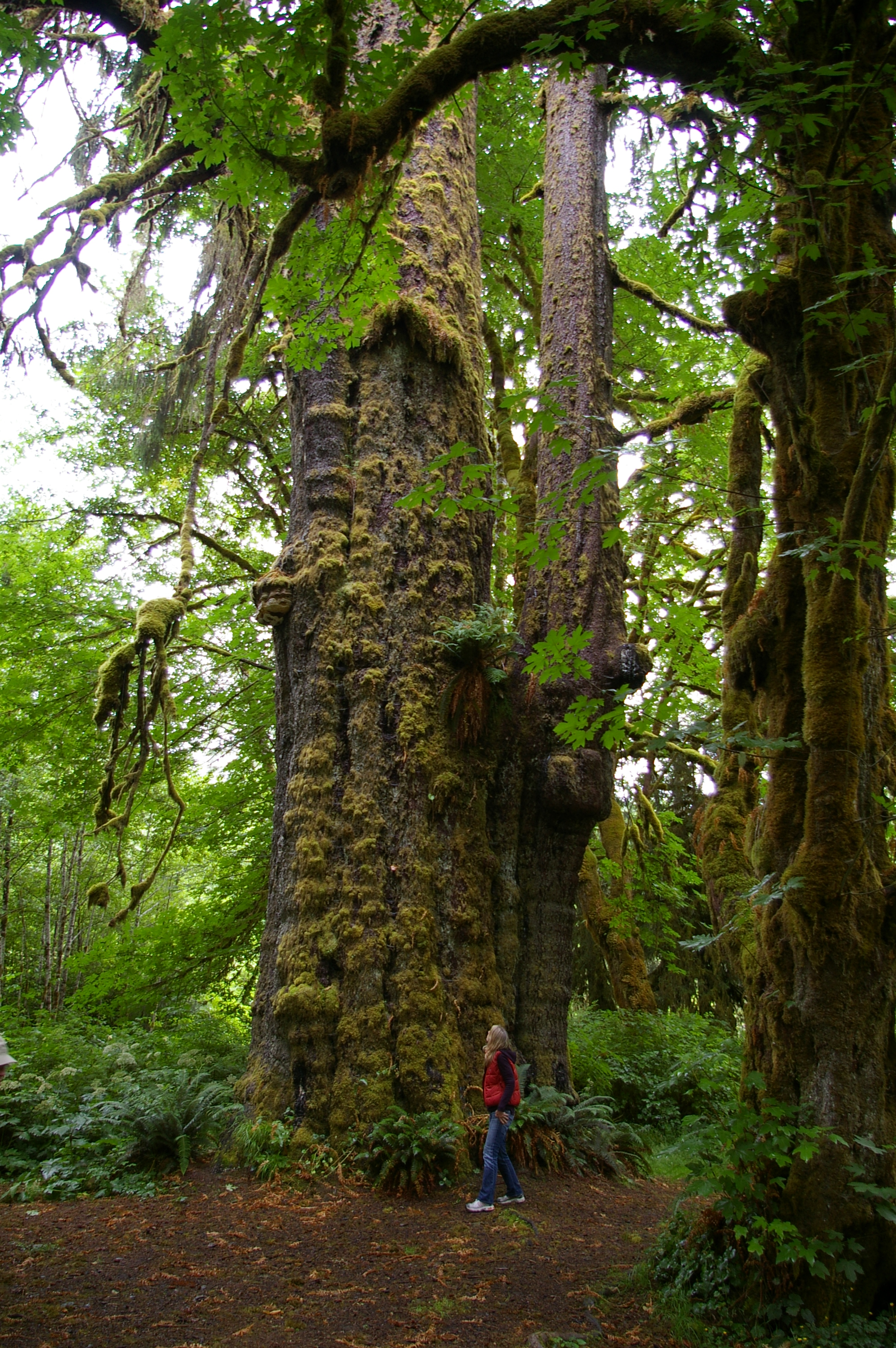
- San Juan Spruce with a human for scale, 2011
- Interactive map of San Juan Spruce
- Species: Sitka spruce (Picea sitchensis)
- Location: Vancouver Island; British Columbia, Canada
- Coordinates: 48°35′17″N 124°11′12″W
- Height: 62.5 m (205 ft)
- Girth: 11.65 m (38.2 ft)
- Diameter: 3.71 m (12.2 ft)
- Volume of trunk: 333 m^{3} (11,800 ft^{3})

The San Juan Spruce is a Sitka spruce (Picea sitchensis) tree located in the San Juan Valley of Vancouver Island, British Columbia, Canada. Until July 2016 it was the second largest known Sitka spruce tree by volume, surpassed only by the Queets Spruce in Washington, United States.

== History ==
The tree flourished due to its location on the shaded southern slopes of the San Juan Valley and on the banks of the San Juan River.

In July 2016, the San Juan Spruce lost significant height and mass due to a lightning strike. It is no longer considered among the largest Sitka spruce trees but its large diameter is still remarkable.

== Dimensions ==
These measurements were taken sometime before 2010, at least six years prior to the tree's partial collapse.

Height above base	60.48 m	198.4 ft
Circumference 1.3 m (4.27 ft) above height point on ground	11.65 m	38.2 ft
Diameter 1.3 m (4.27 ft) above height point on ground	3.71 m	12.2 ft
Average crown spread	22.9 m	75.1 ft
Estimated bole volume	333 m^{3}	11,760 ft^{3}

== See also ==
- Port Renfrew - a nearby community
- Red Creek Fir
- List of individual trees
