= British Columbia Highway 14 =

Highway on Vancouver Island in British Columbia, Canada

Highway 14
- West Coast (Sooke) Highway
- Highway 14 highlighted in red

Route information
- Maintained by the Ministry of Transportation and Infrastructure
- Length: 98 km (61 mi)
- Existed: 1953–present

Major junctions
- East end: Highway 1 (TCH) in Langford
- West end: Government Wharf in Port Renfrew

Location
- Country: Canada
- Province: British Columbia

Highway system
- British Columbia provincial highways
← Highway 13	→ Highway 15

British Columbia Highway 14, named the West Coast (Sooke) Highway is the southernmost numbered route in the province of British Columbia. An east–west highway on the southwestern coast of Vancouver Island in the Capital Regional District, it is sometimes known as West Coast Road, as well as Sooke Road, Sooke being one of the largest communities that the highway passes through. Highway 14 first opened in 1953, extending west from Colwood, a suburb of Victoria, to the coastal community of Jordan River, and was extended all the way west to the remote community of Port Renfrew by 1975. The highway's eastern terminus was relocated to northern Langford in 2002.

Outside of urban areas the route has exceptionally winding, curving and hilly stretches. Some of the sharper corners have oversized, freeway-style, jersey barriers instead of the more typical steel crash rails, mostly to prevent an out-of-control vehicle from falling off a cliff into the Strait of Juan de Fuca. Some bridges are single lane and were built corduroy road style.

== Route details ==
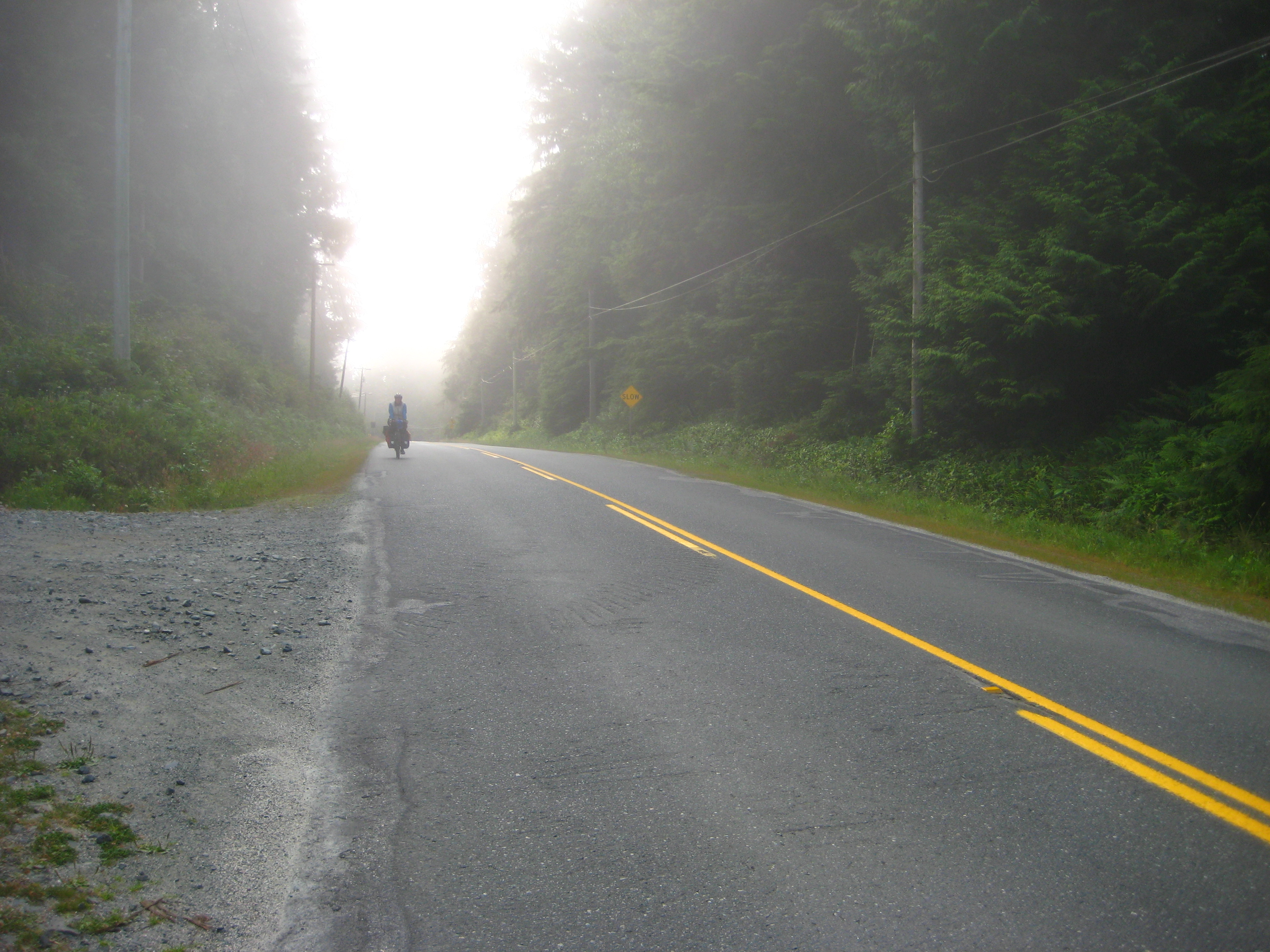
Highway 14 just west of French Beach Provincial Park

The total length of Highway 14 is 98.43 kilometres (61.16 mi). In the east, Highway 14 begins at an interchange with the Trans-Canada Highway (Exit 14) in north Langford, proceeding south for 3 km (1.9 mi) as the four-lane Veterans Memorial Parkway through the community of Langford. The highway then turns west as the two-lane Sooke Road, continuing through Langford and Metchosin for 22 km (14 mi). At the signalized Westshore Parkway intersection, the highway becomes four lanes for 3.5km before returning to 2 lanes. A short 1.4km four-lane, divided standard upgrade to the highway was completed in 2023 with an interchange at Gillespie Road (Exit 31), providing access to East Sooke. The highway passes by a local hill known as Mount Helmcken, before entering Sooke. After Sooke, Highway 14 proceeds west for 36 km (22 mi) to Jordan River, hugging the coastline for most of the distance. Highway 14 then travels west northwest along the southwestern coast of the Island for 42 km (26 mi), finally terminating at a Department of Fisheries and Oceans dock in the town of Port Renfrew.

Prior to realignment in 2002, Highway 14 travelled through Colwood from the junction of Old Island Highway (former Highway 1A) and Goldstream Avenue to its current intersection with Veterans Memorial Parkway.

== Major intersections ==
The entire route is in Capital Regional District.

Location	km	mi	Exit	Destinations	Notes
Langford	0.00	0.00		Highway 1 (TCH) / Millstream Road – Victoria, Nanaimo	Highway 14 eastern terminus; interchange (Highway 1 exit 14); continues to Millstream Road; Highway 14 follows Veterans Memorial Parkway
Langford	1.29	0.80		Goldstream Avenue	Former Highway 1A
Colwood	3.53	2.19		Veterans Memorial Parkway / Sooke Road	Highway 14 follows Sooke Road west; Highway 14 formerly continued on Sooke Road east
Sooke	16.77	10.42	31	Gillespie Road	Interchange
Sooke	25.59	15.90		Otter Point Road / Murray Road	
Port Renfrew	96.39	59.89		Deering Road (Highway 902:0378 north) – Lake Cowichan	To Pacific Marine Road (Highway 902:0377 north)
Port Renfrew	98.43	61.16		Government wharf	Highway 14 western terminus
1.000 mi = 1.609 km; 1.000 km = 0.621 mi

== See also ==
- Pacific Marine Circle Route
