= Big Lonely Doug =

Coast Douglas-fir in British Columbia, Canada

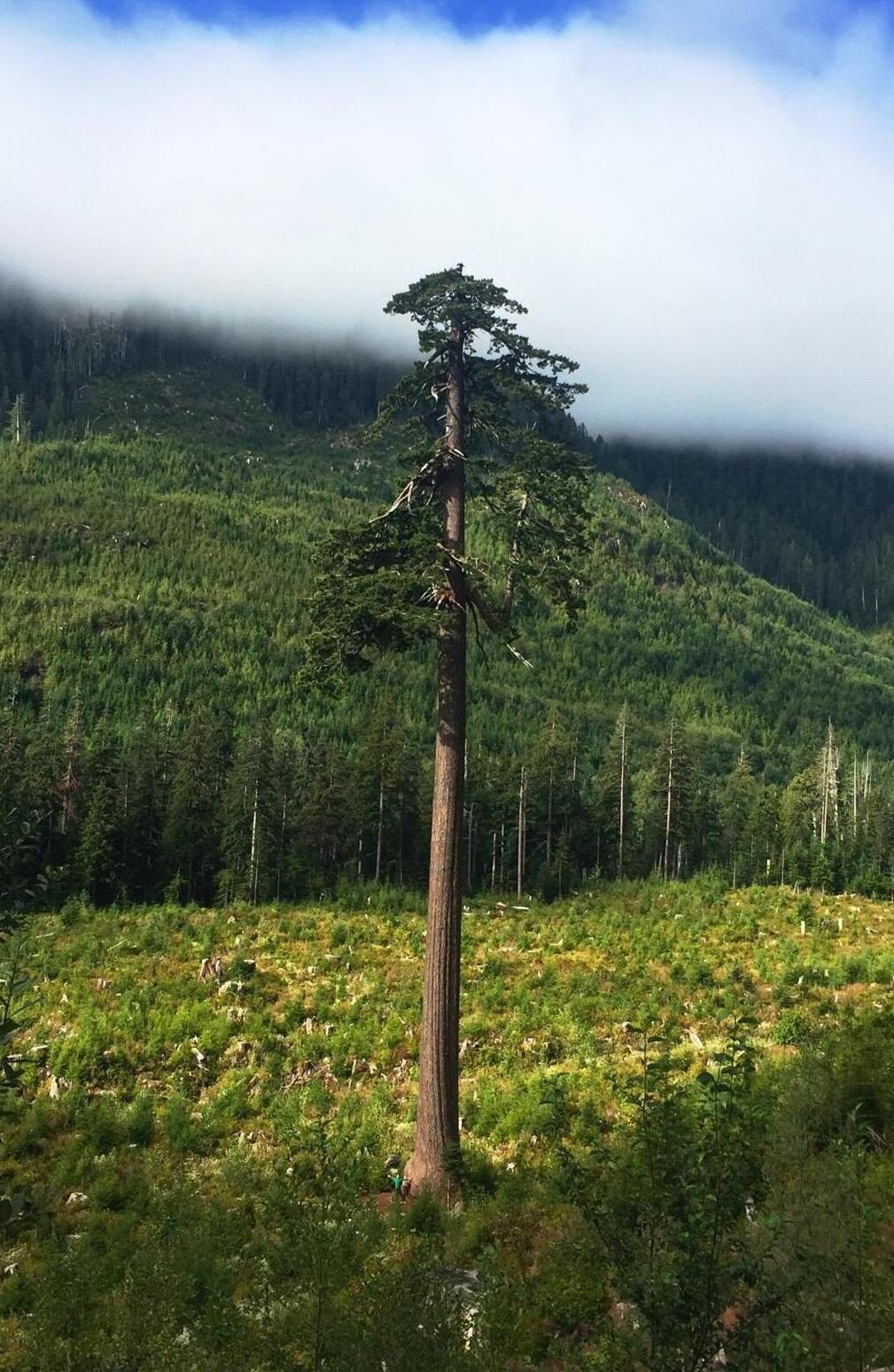
- Photo of Big Lonely Doug from 2018 with a person at the base for scale
- Interactive map of Big Lonely Doug
- Species: Coast Douglas-fir (Pseudotsuga menziesii var. menziesii)
- Location: Vancouver Island; British Columbia, Canada
- Coordinates: 48.64626°N 124.45063°W
- Height: 66.0 m (216.5 ft)
- Girth: 11.91 m (39.1 ft)
- Diameter: 3.79 m (12.4 ft)
- Date seeded: ~1000 CE

Big Lonely Doug is a large Coast Douglas-fir (Pseudotsuga menziesii) tree located in the Gordon River Valley, 10 km north of Port Renfrew on Vancouver Island, British Columbia, Canada. It is one of the largest Douglas-fir trees in the world. It has the third highest tree score and third widest diameter of any known Douglas-fir in Canada, following the Red Creek Fir in the nearby San Juan Valley and the Bonin Giant in the Coquitlam River watershed in British Columbia's Lower Mainland.

== History ==
The tree was seeded sometime around 1000 CE.

In 2011, logger Dennis Cronin discovered the enormous tree while surveying a patch of forest that was to be logged for timber. He wrapped green ribbon around the tree with the words "Leave Tree" repeated along the ribbon, saving it from being felled. In 2014, photographer and activist T.J. Watt happened upon the tree and named it "Big Lonely Doug", a play on the tree's species name and its relative isolation amid the clearcut. The tree has since become a symbol of nature conservation in Canada, and was featured in the 2018 book Big Lonely Doug: The Story of One of Canada's Last Great Trees by journalist Harley Rustad.

== Dimensions ==
These measurements were made by forest ecologist Andy MacKinnon on behalf of the Ancient Forest Alliance and University of British Columbia on 18 April 2014. The results were published the following week on 24 April 2014.

Height above base	66.0 m	216.5 ft
Circumference 1.37 m (4.49 ft) above point of germination	11.91 m	39.1 ft
Diameter 1.37 m (4.49 ft) above point of germination	3.79 m	12.4 ft
Average crown spread	18.33 m	60.1 ft

== Gallery ==
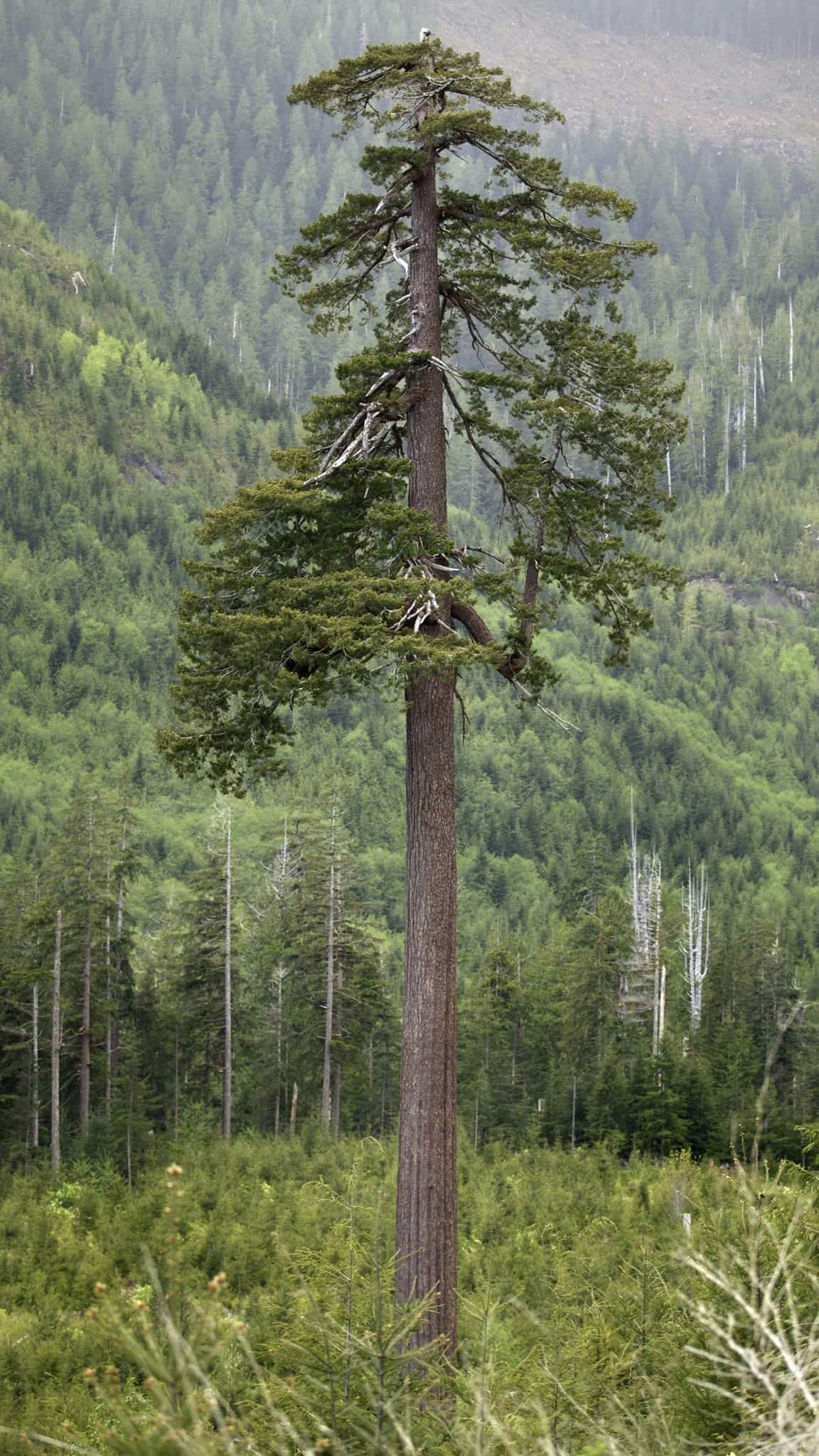

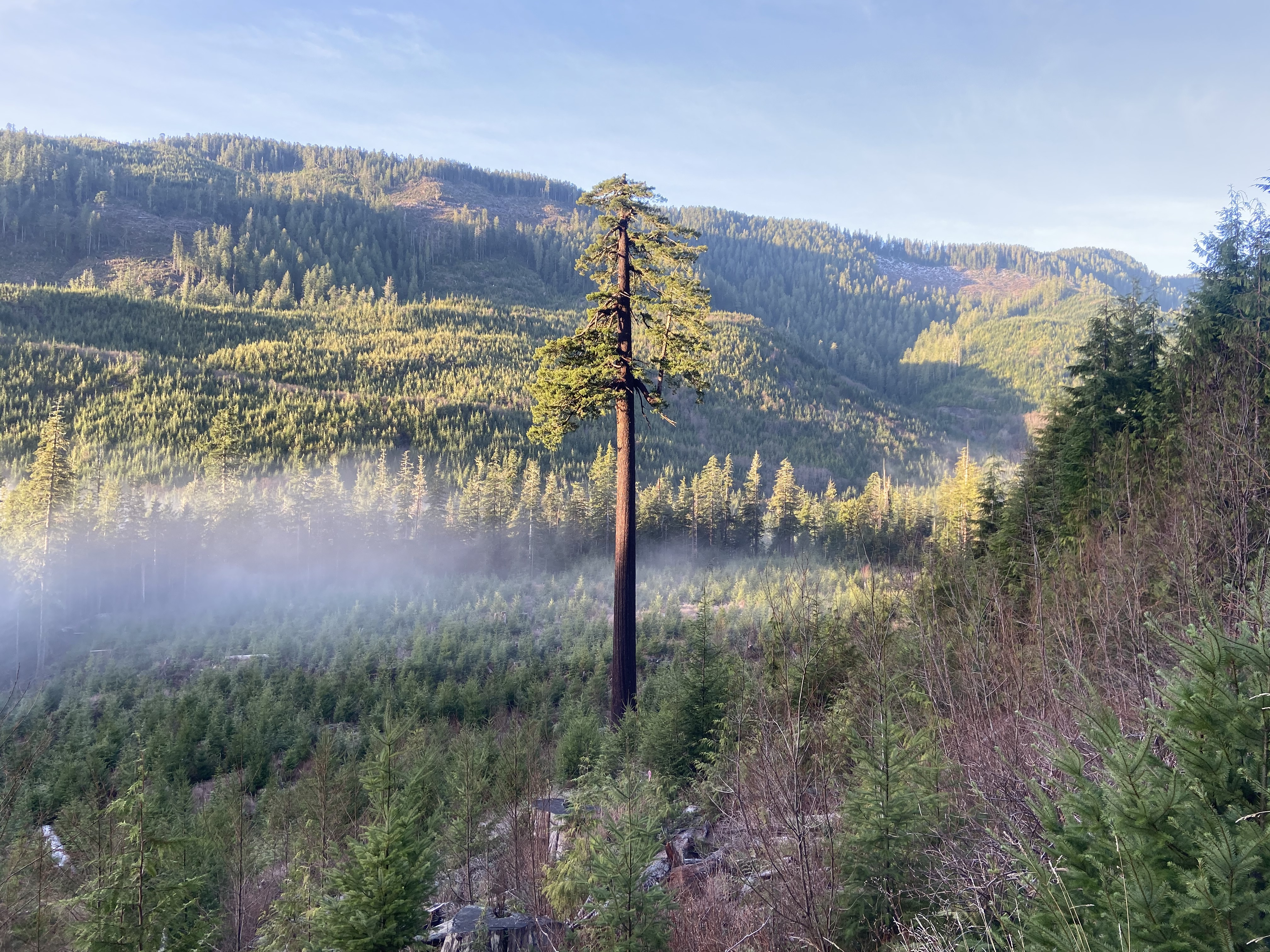

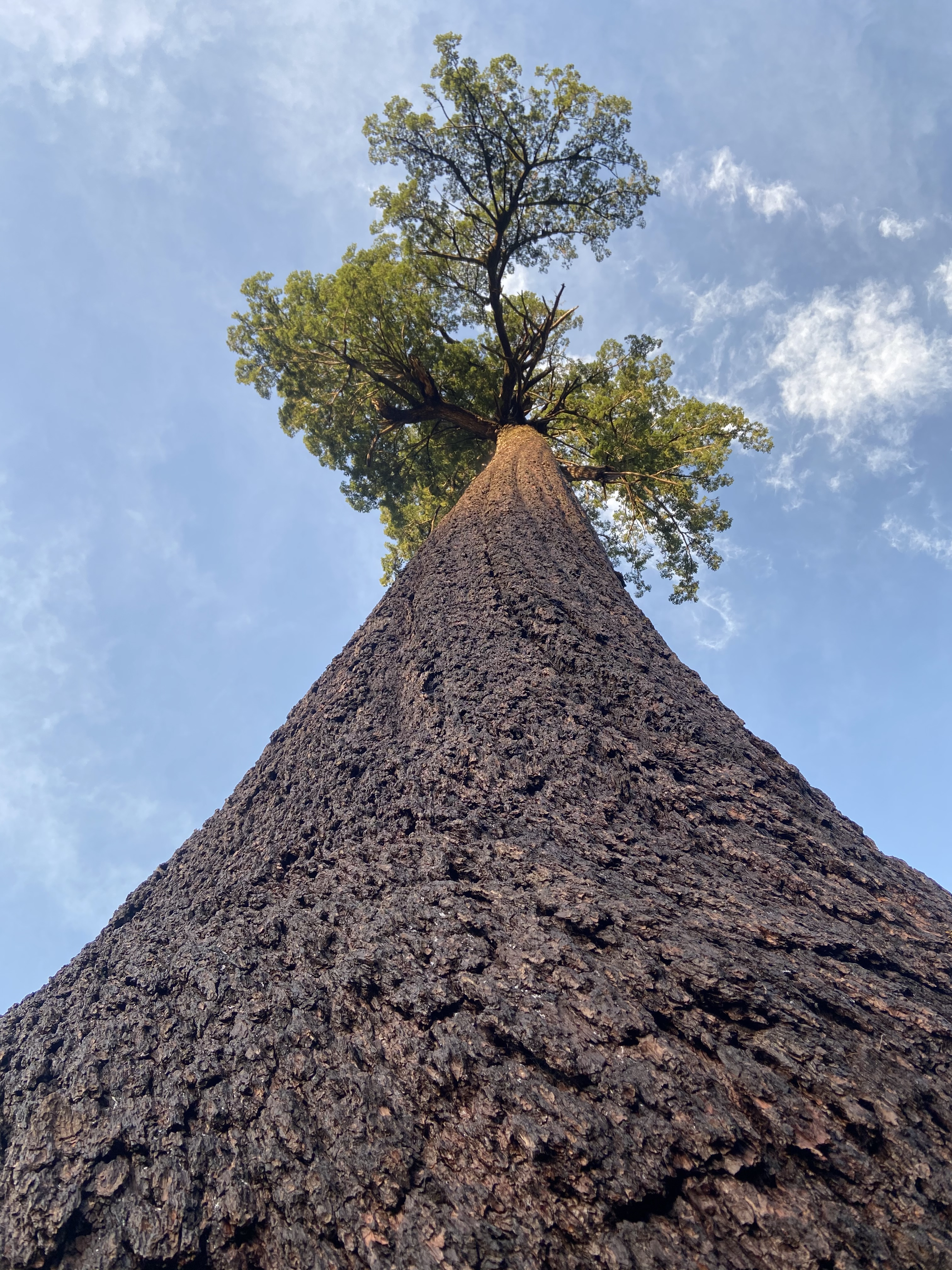

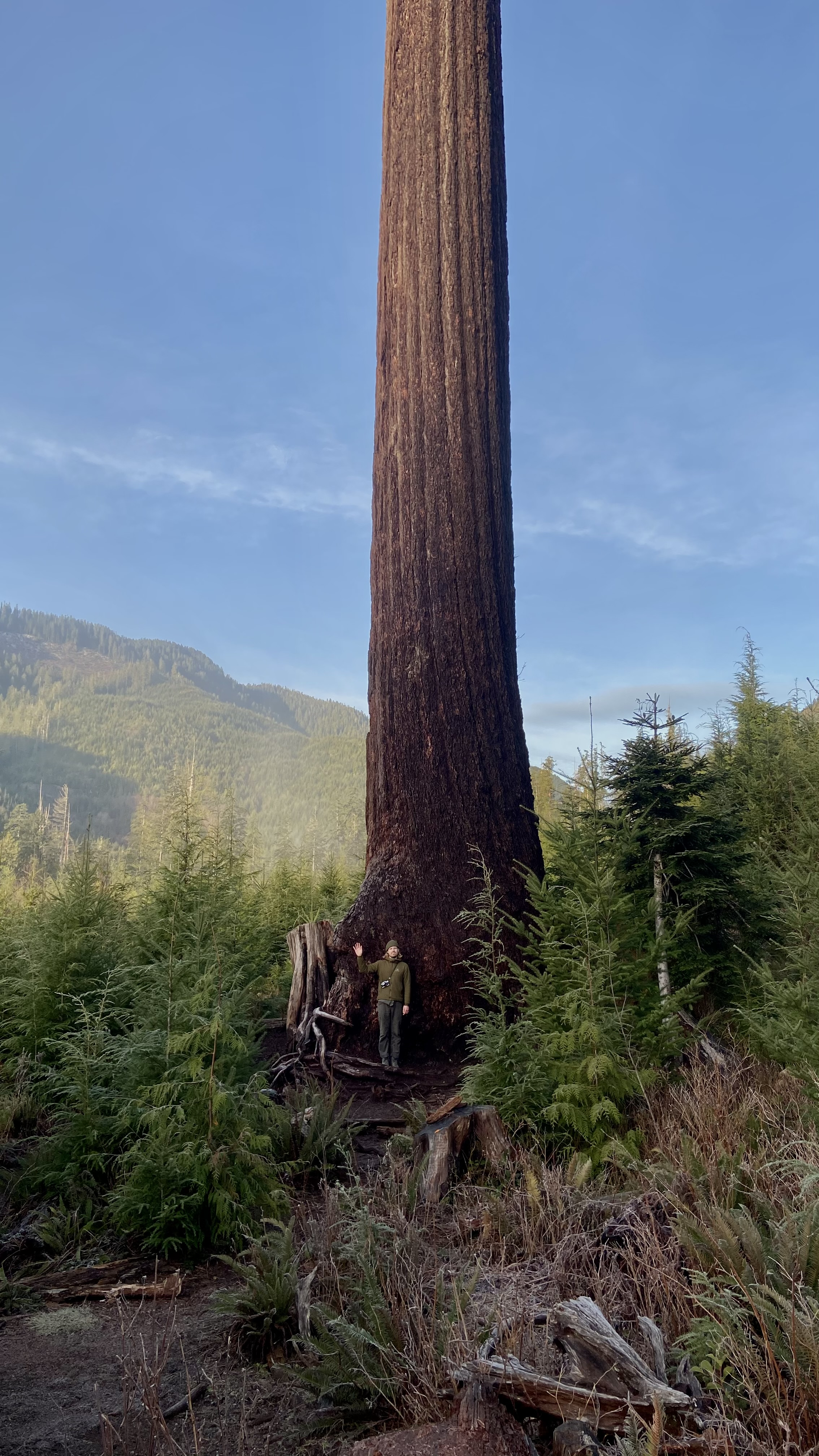

== See also ==
- Boole - a giant sequoia whose immediate surroundings were also clearcut
- List of tallest trees
- List of individual trees
