= Mount Helmcken =

Hill in British Columbia, Canada

- Location within Vancouver Island Location within British Columbia
- Location in

Highest point
- Elevation: 328 m (1,076 ft)
- Prominence: 193 m (633 ft)
- Parent peak: Empress Mountain (682 m)
- Listing: Mountains of British Columbia
- Coordinates: 48°24′33″N 123°34′41″W

Geography
- Location: British Columbia, Canada
- District: Metchosin Land District
- Parent range: Vancouver Island Ranges
- Topo map: NTS 92B5 Sooke

Mount Helmcken is a large hill in Metchosin, east of Sooke, in British Columbia, Canada. It is also just west of Colwood. The mountain is accessed via Neild Road which runs all the way to the top where it joins Zanita Heights.

The mountain is named for John S. Helmcken, a surgeon for the Hudson's Bay Company who opposed the province's entry into Confederation, preferring annexation by the United States.
