= Flagging (tape) =

Coloured non-adhesive tape used in marking objects

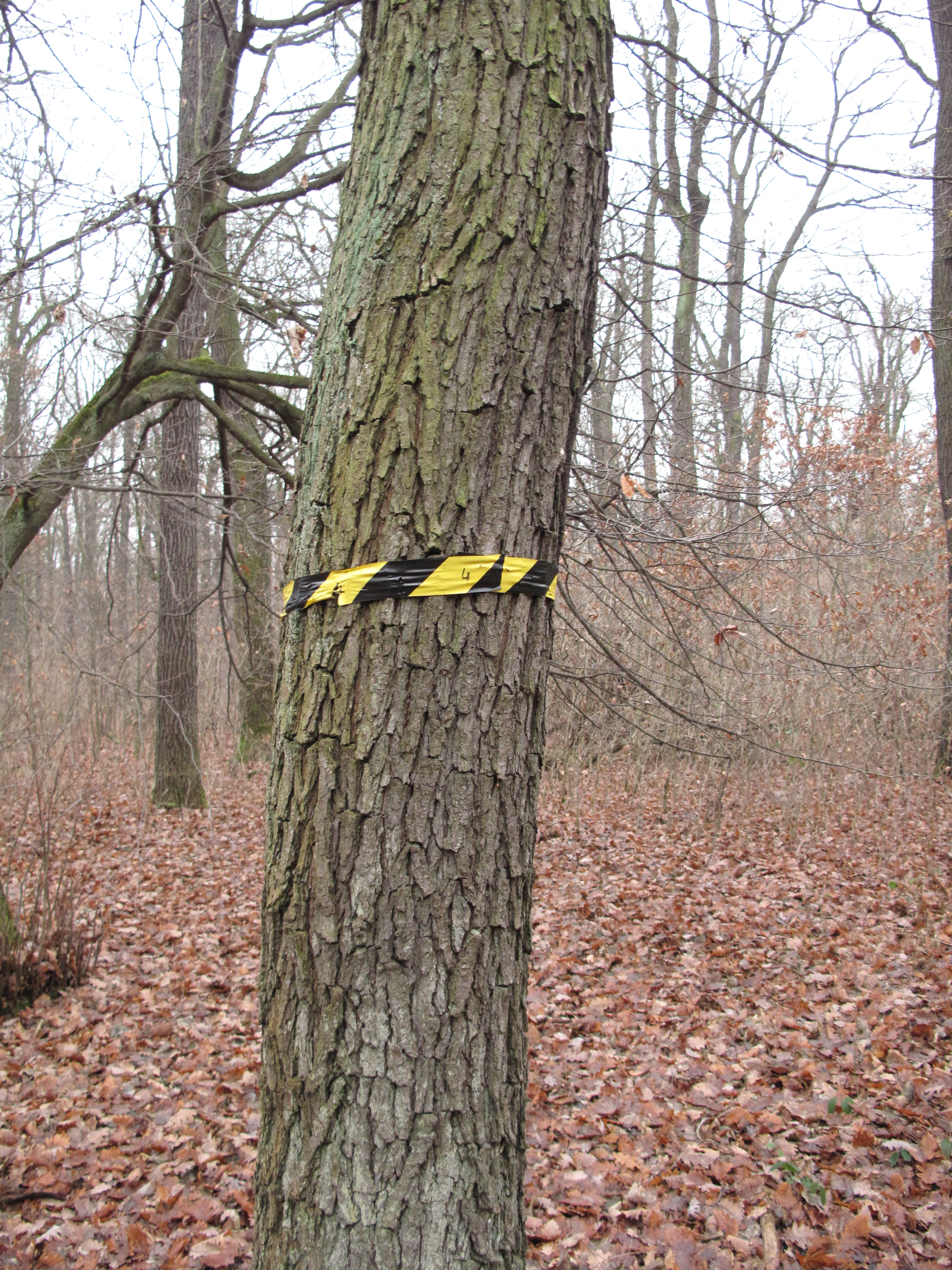
Tree marking in the natural monument Černý orel, Mladá Boleslav District, Czech Republic.

Flagging is a coloured non-adhesive tape used in marking objects. It is commonly made of PVC or vinyl, though wood fibre cellulose-based biodegradable flagging also exists.

== Uses ==
=== Surveying ===
Flagging is used in surveying to mark grade levels, utility lines, survey stakes and other boundary markers. Surveyors frequently attach their flagging to wooden stakes or lathes, with writing on it. One side tends to have a long number which they reference in a log book. The other side tends to have abbreviations suggesting what the stake marks. Choice of colour depends on many factors, and can include availability, and personal preference, or may adhere to some sort of colour code. No colour codes appear to be mandatory or universal, but certain colours do tend to be used for specific purposes.

=== Forestry ===
In forestry flagging is commonly used to mark trees for various purposes. It can be used to mark trees for logging, to mark dangerous or unhealthy trees, to mark invasive species, or to mark saplings. State and National forests often use a wide variety of flagging tape, sometimes even getting specially printed tape when the full range of colour codes is used up.

=== Wildland fire suppression ===
Flagging is widely used in wildfire suppression both as a navigational aid for firefighters and to mark trees. When walking to a wildfire a crew may use flagging to flag their way to the fire, both to aid other firefighters in quickly finding the site and so they can find their way back out easily. Specially marked flagging also exists for fire use, imprinted with terms such as "spot fire" or "escape route". Hot pink flagging is considered the best colour for marking escape routes due to its visibility. Lime green is most visible for colour blind people but is less visible for those with full colour vision.

=== Triage ===
In triage, flagging is used in lieu of a triage tag to mark patients in a mass casualty disaster situation. Four colours of flagging are typically used:

- Black - deceased
- Red - seriously injured, in need of immediate medical attention to save life
- Yellow - seriously injured but not immediately life-threatening, medical attention can be delayed
- Green - non-serious injuries or "walking wounded"

=== Outdoor recreation ===
Flagging is used as a navigational aid by hunters, hikers, geocachers, spelunkers, mountain bikers, off-road vehicle users, and for other uses such as paintball.

=== Forensic uses ===
Flagging tape can be used in the field of crime scene photography to show the trajectory of bullets. It's preferable to string due to the wider thickness and reflectiveness though it is harder to pull tight across long distances.
