= Seymour Range =

Mountain range in British Columbia, Canada

Coordinates: 48.676°N 124.024°W

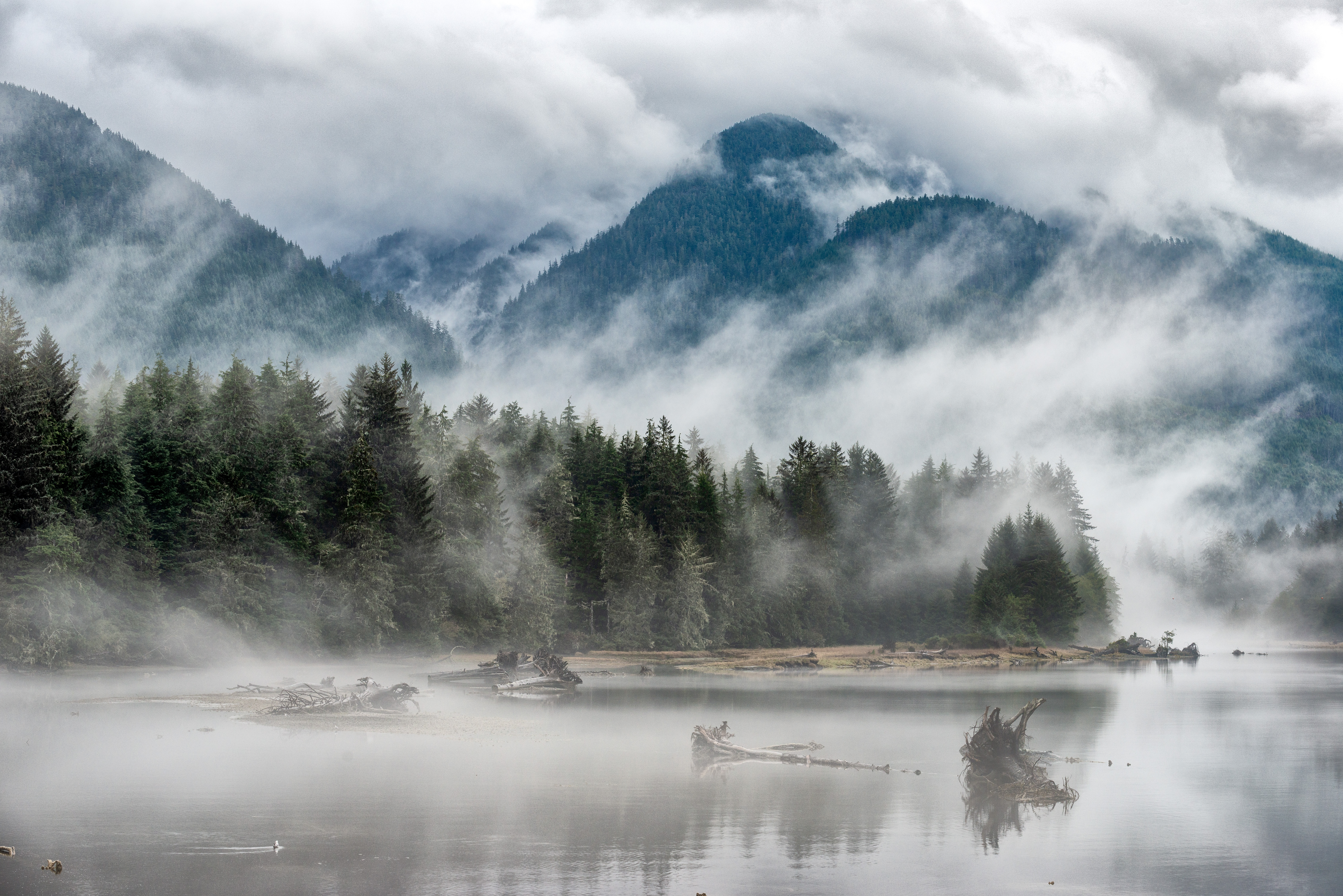
- View of the Seymour Range from Pacheena Reserve 1

Dimensions
- Area: 888 km^{2} (343 mi^{2})

Geography
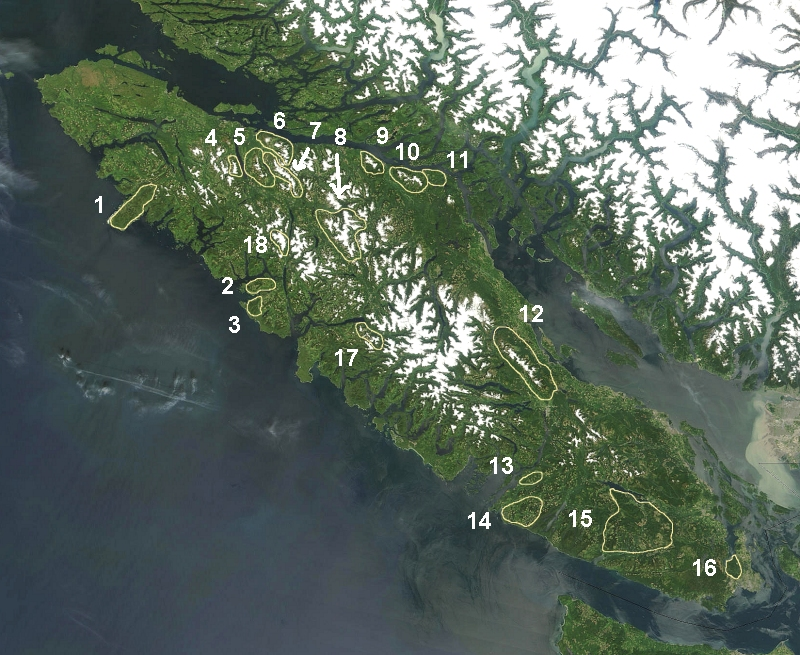
- The Seymour Range is marked 15 on map.
- Country: Canada
- Region: British Columbia
- Parent range: Vancouver Island Ranges

The Seymour Range is a low and small mountain range comprising the mountains/hills between the valley of Cowichan Lake and that of the San Juan River on southern Vancouver Island, British Columbia, Canada. It has an area of 888 km^{2} and is a subrange of the Vancouver Island Ranges which in turn form part of the Insular Mountains.

== See also ==
- Mountain ranges of British Columbia
- San Juan River
