= French Beach Provincial Park =

Provincial park in British Columbia, Canada

- IUCN category II (national park)
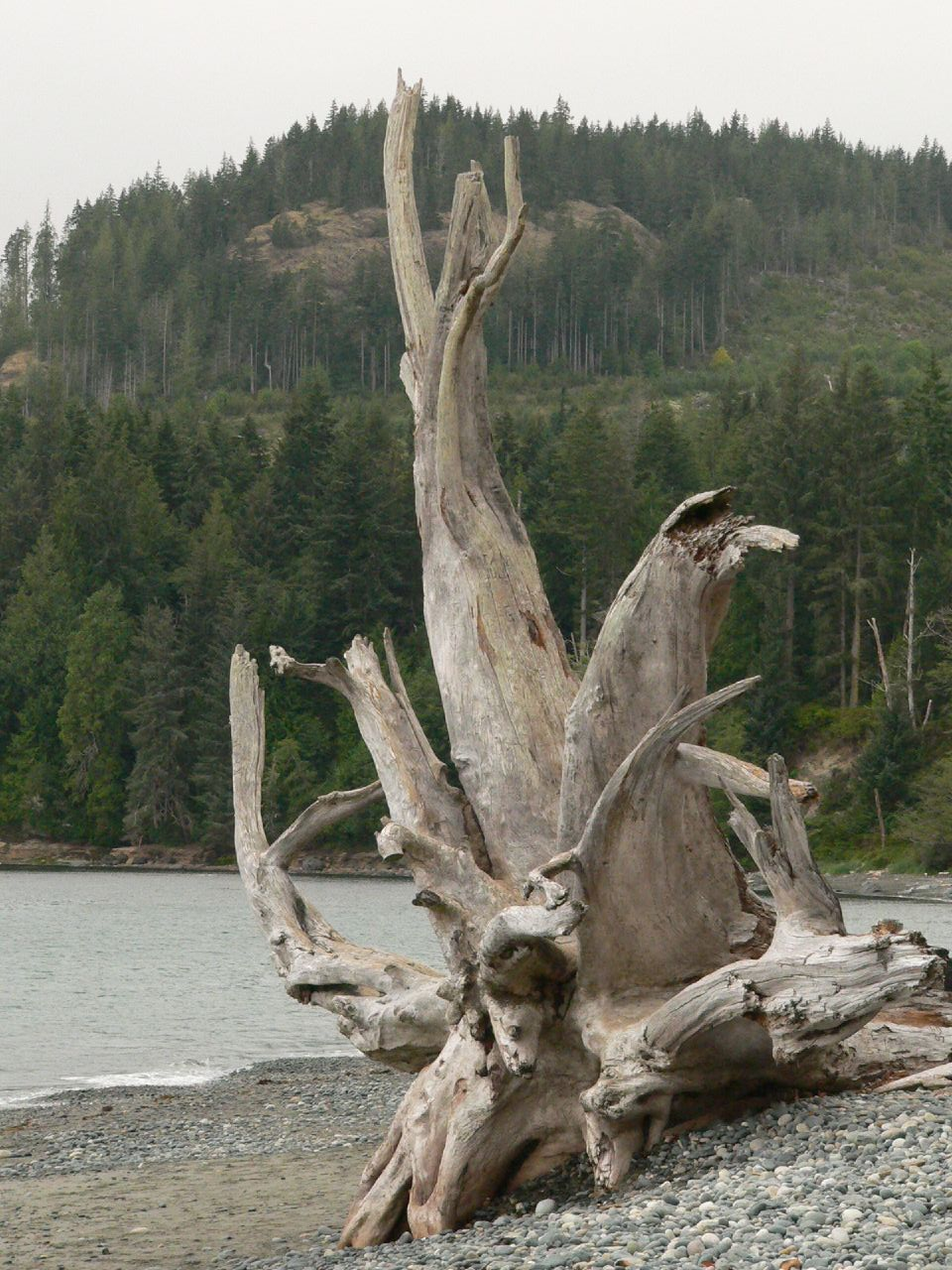
- Photo of driftwood on French Beach

- Location within Vancouver Island Location within British Columbia
- Interactive map of French Beach Provincial Park
- Location: Renfrew Land District, British Columbia, Canada
- Nearest city: Victoria, BC
- Coordinates: 48°23′37″N 123°56′36″W
- Area: 55 ha (140 acres)
- Established: January 24, 1974
- Governing body: BC Parks

French Beach Provincial Park is a provincial park on Vancouver Island, between Sooke and Jordan River, British Columbia. The area has a day use parking lot and B.C. provincial campground. It was created in 1980 as the first family-oriented park on the southwest coast of Vancouver Island. Situated on the scenic Strait of Juan de Fuca on the west coast of southern Vancouver Island, French Beach Provincial Park offers views of the Strait and the Olympic Mountains. The beach spreads on 1,600-meters and is a location for whale watching as well as spotting Bald eagles, Ospreys and a variety of seabirds.
