= Red Creek Fir =

Largest known Douglas fir in Canada

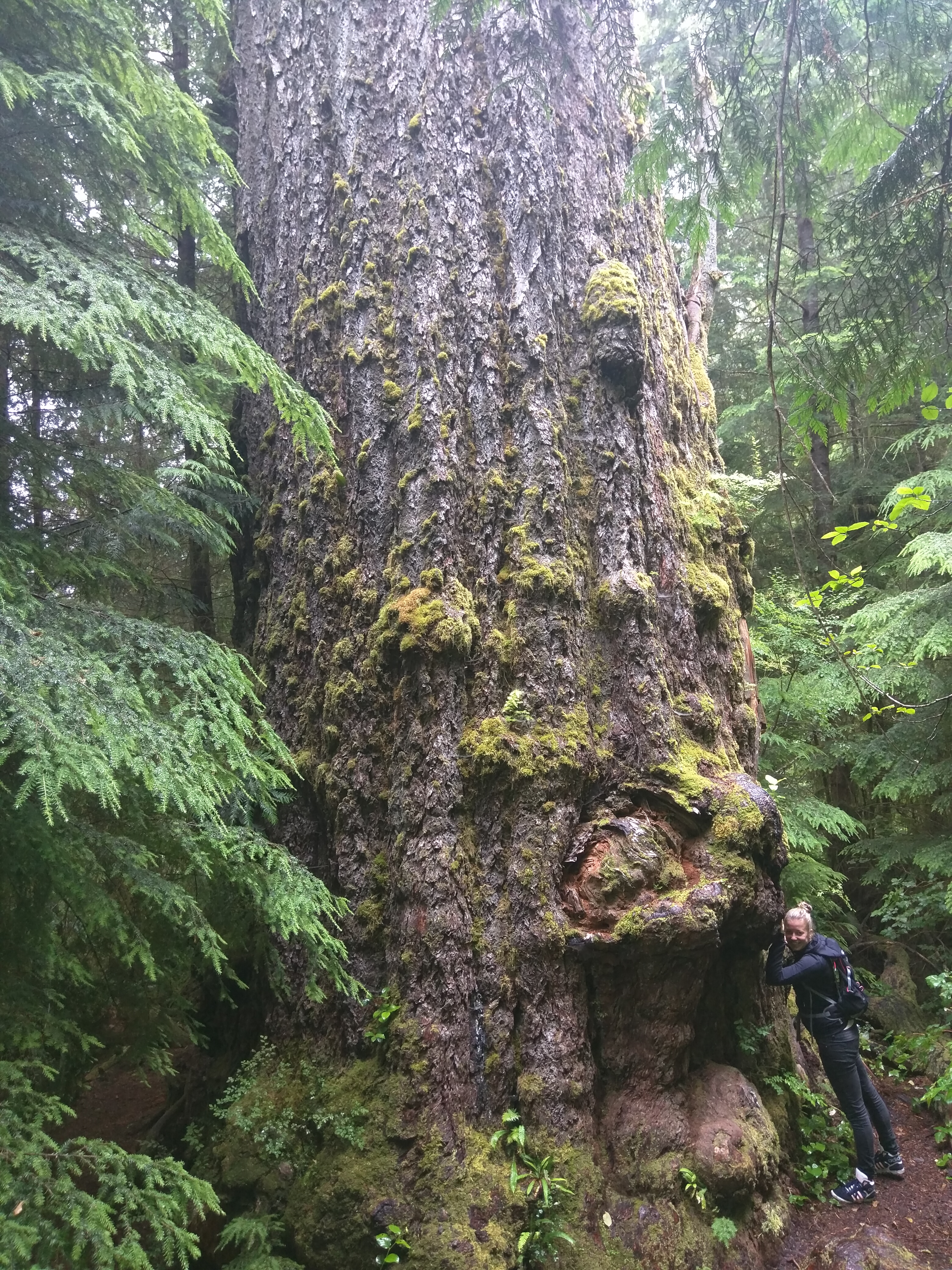
- Red Creek Fir with a woman standing at its base
- Interactive map of Red Creek Fir
- Species: Douglas fir (Pseudotsuga menziesii)
- Location: Vancouver Island; British Columbia, Canada
- Coordinates: 48°34′46″N 124°13′15″W
- Height: 74.0 m (242.8 ft)
- Girth: 13.3 m (44 ft)
- Diameter: 4.23 m (13.9 ft)
- Volume of trunk: 349 m^{3} (12,300 ft^{3})
- Date seeded: ~1000 CE

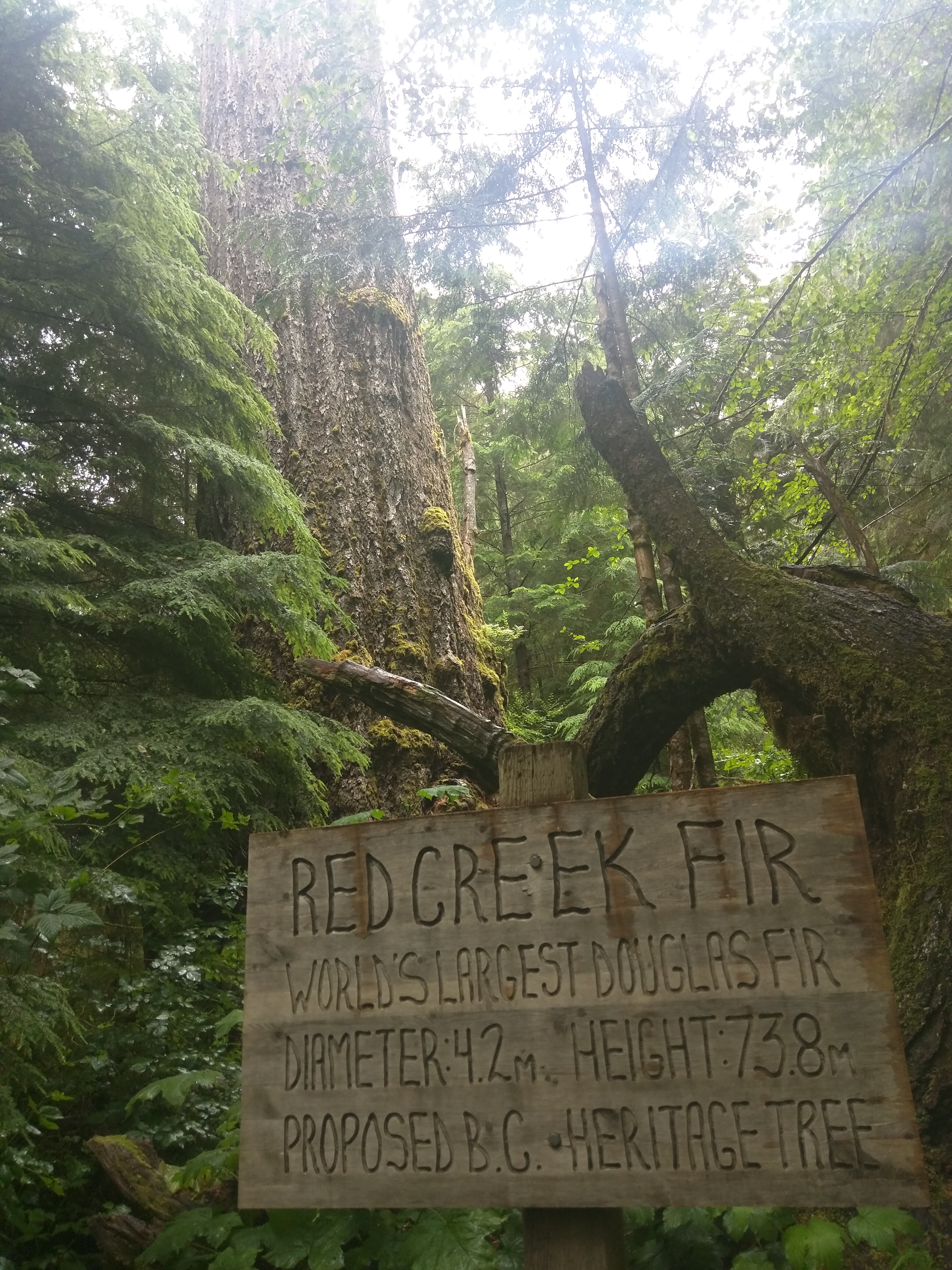
Red Creek Fir sign

The Red Creek Fir, located in the San Juan Valley of Vancouver Island, British Columbia, Canada, is the largest known Douglas-fir (Pseudotsuga menziesii) in Canada. It has the highest tree score of any known tree in Canada and the fourth highest tree score of any known douglas-fir in the world. At times it has been considered to be the largest known Douglas fir tree on earth by volume, though some trees may be larger.

== History ==
The tree was seeded sometime around 1000 CE. Damage to the tree indicates it has had its top blown off by storms at least twice in history, suggesting that it was likely once notably taller than it is now.

Because the tree is situated on Crown land only a few dozen metres away from private logging boundaries, it has frequently been at the centre of conservation battles. Environmental organizations have campaigned extensively to give the tree "hard" legislated protection—such as inclusion in a provincial park or ecological reserve—to prevent clearcutting of the surrounding buffer forest. Without a buffer, conservationists argue the giant tree is highly susceptible to being blown down by windstorms. In 2010, proposed clearcutting boundaries by the timber company TimberWest were marked immediately adjacent to the tree, though the logging was eventually deferred following public outcry.

Despite these efforts, the tree does not yet have formal, permanent governmental protection aside from being placed within a public Forest Service Recreation Site and an Old-Growth Management Area. Proposals have existed to extend the Pacific Rim National Park Reserve down the west coast of Vancouver Island to include the Red Creek Fir, and another sought to have it listed by Heritage BC. As of July 2016, both proposals have been unsuccessful.

The Red Creek Fir is located about 15 kilometres (a 45-minute drive via rough logging roads) east of the town of Port Renfrew, which is nicknamed the "Tall Tree Capital of Canada" due to the area's remaining old-growth giants. The tree is situated in the same river valley region as other notable record-breaking trees, including the San Juan Spruce (Canada's largest Sitka spruce) and Big Lonely Doug (Canada's second-largest Douglas-fir).

== Dimensions ==
Height above base	74.0 m	242.8 ft
Circumference 1.37 m (4.49 ft) above point of germination	13.28 m	43.6 ft
Diameter 1.37 m (4.49 ft) above point of germination	4.23 m	13.9 ft
Average crown spread	23.0 m	75.5 ft

== See also ==
- List of individual trees
- List of superlative trees
