= Pacheedaht First Nation =

Nuu-chah-nulth band government in British Columbia, Canada

Coordinates: 48°34′39″N 124°24′30″W

- Band No. 658
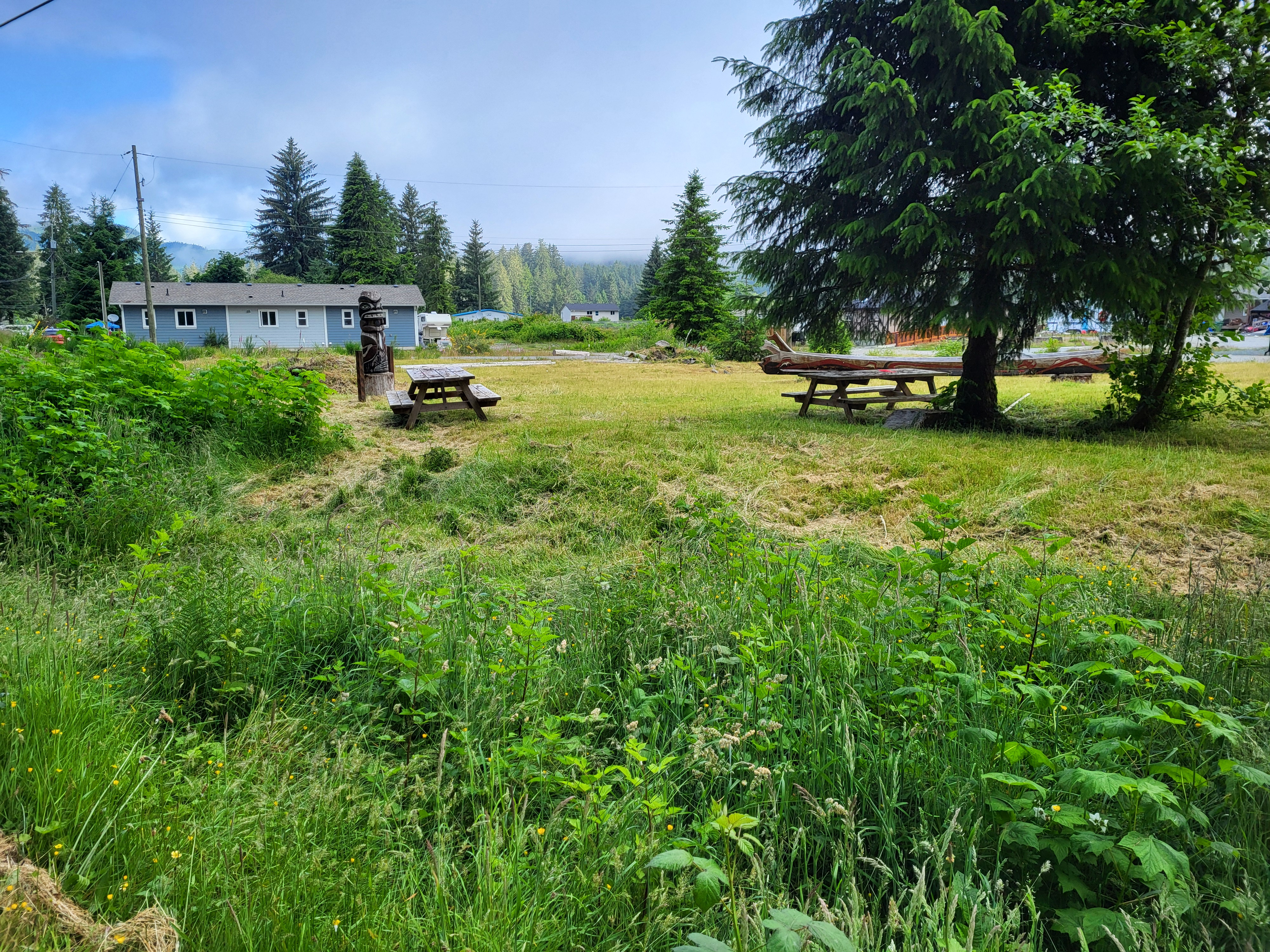
- Small Park on the Pacheedaht Reserve

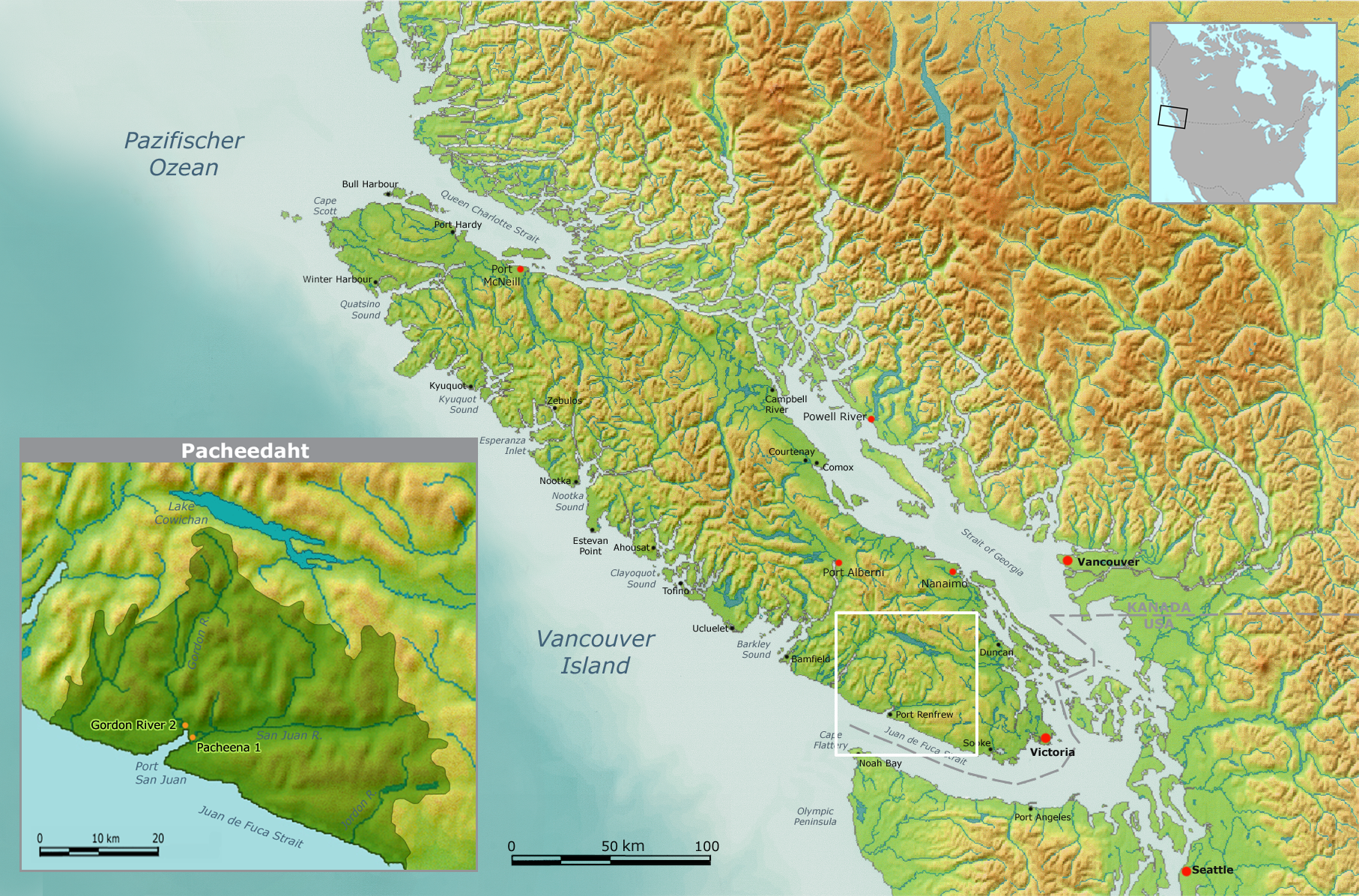
- People: Nuu-chah-nulth
- Headquarters: Port Renfrew
- Province: British Columbia

Land
- Main reserve: Gordon River 2
- Reserves: Cullite 3; Pacheena 1; Queesidaquah 4
- Land area: 1.80 km^{2} (0.69 sq mi)

Population (March 2025)
- On reserve: 97
- On other land: 32
- Off reserve: 172
- Total population: 301

Government
- Chief: Arliss Daniels (Jones)
- Council: Tracy Charlie; Natasha Jones

Website
- www.pacheedaht.ca

The Pacheedaht First Nation (lit. 'People of the Seafoam', formerly Pacheena) is a band government of the Nuu-chah-nulth Nation, based near Port Renfrew on the west coast of Vancouver Island in British Columbia, Canada. They are one of 14 Nuu-chah-nulth band governments, though they are not a member of the Nuu-chah-nulth Tribal Council.

The government has 4 reserve lands for a total of approximately 180 hectares: Pacheena #1, Gordon River #2, Cullite #3, Queesidaquah #4. As of March 2025, they have 301 registered band members, though only 97 live on reserve.

As of 2024, Pacheedaht, alongside the Ditidaht First Nation, is in stage 5 of the BC Treaty Process. They signed an agreement-in-principle in 2019, stating that the First Nation will have 1,897 hectares (18.97 km^{2}) of land, including former reserve land.

== See also ==
- Ditidaht language
- Nuu-chah-nulth
- Makah
