= Port Renfrew =

Unincorporated community on Vancouver Island in British Columbia, Canada

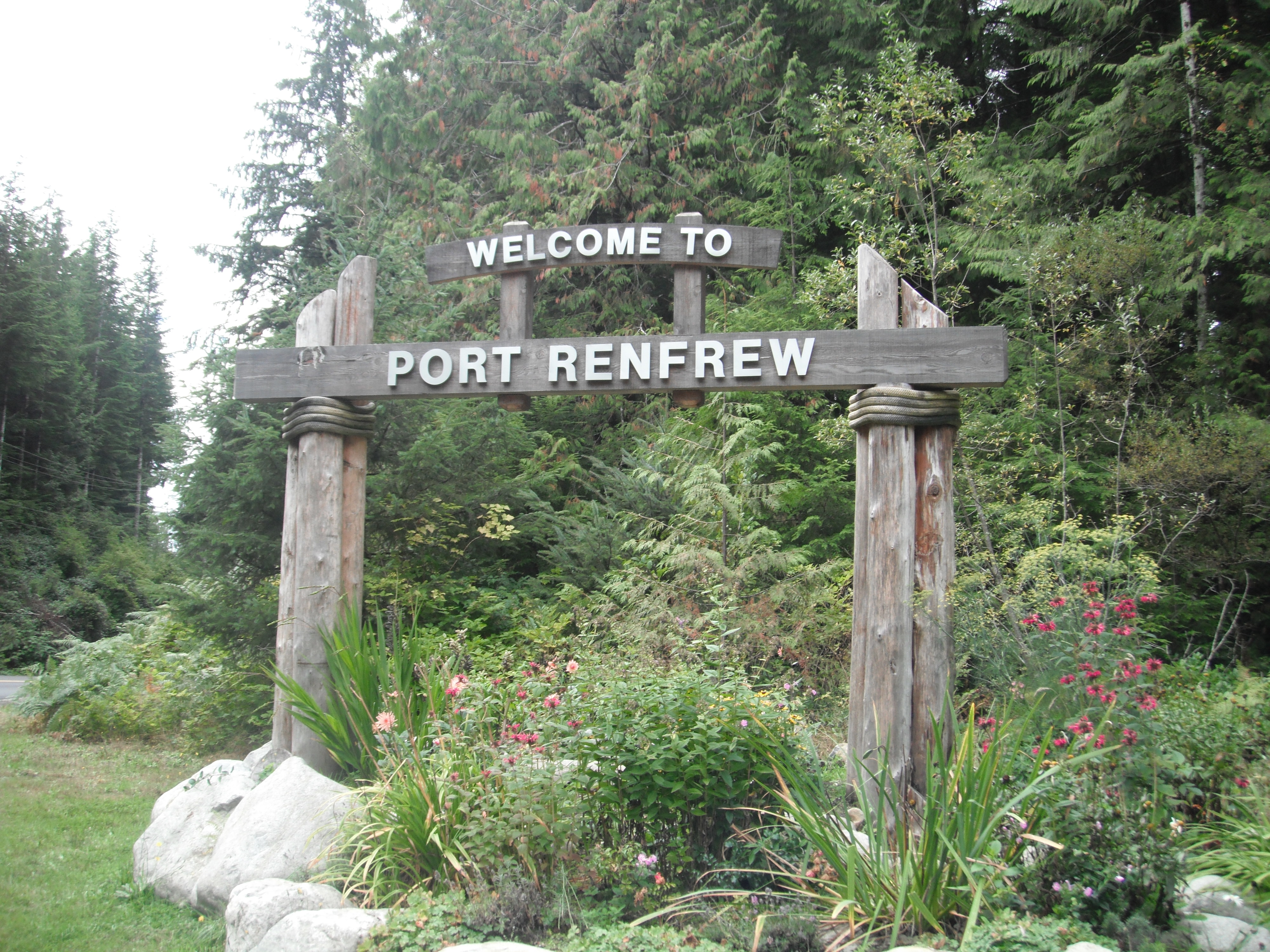
- Nicknames: The Land of Plenty, The Tall Tree Capital of Canada
- Location of Port Renfrew within the Capital Regional District

- Location of Port Renfrew Port Renfrew (British Columbia) Port Renfrew (Canada)
- Coordinates: 48°33′N 124°25′W
- Country: Canada
- Province: British Columbia

Area
  - Land: 8.69 km^{2} (3.36 sq mi)

Population (2021)
  - Total: 262
  - Density: 16.6/km^{2} (43/sq mi)
- Time zone: UTC−07:00 (Pacific Time)
- Postal code: V0S 0A1 & V0S 1K0
- Website: https://www.portrenfrew.com

Port Renfrew is a small unincorporated community located on the south shore of Port San Juan, an inlet on the west coast of Vancouver Island in British Columbia, Canada. Port Renfrew has a population of 262 (as of the 2021 Canadian census) and has been touted as "the Tall Tree Capital of Canada".

== History ==
Originally named Port San Juan, the original colonists changed the name to honour Lord Renfrew who planned to settle crofters there. The name change was due to mail being sent to the San Juan Islands instead of Port San Juan and the inlet the town sits beside retains the name. Like many coastal Vancouver Island communities, Port Renfrew has a rich history of forestry and fishing.

Between 1830 and 1925, 137 major shipping tragedies occurred in the immediate vicinity of the entrance to the Strait of Juan de Fuca. This stretch of coastline around Port Renfrew became known as the Graveyard of the Pacific.

== Geography ==
Located at the head of the Port San Juan inlet, Port Renfrew lies adjacent to this natural harbour as well as the San Juan River. The other end of the inlet is located on the Strait of Juan de Fuca near its confluence with the Pacific Ocean. The San Juan Valley lies northeast of the town, surrounded by mountains on all sides.

Port Renfrew can be accessed from Victoria via BC Highway 14 West, or from Lake Cowichan via Pacific Marine Road.

=== Climate ===
The climate is classic oceanic (Köppen: Cfb), because it is close to the Strait of Juan de Fuca towards the interior, the Mediterranean trend of rainfall patterns begins to be evidenced with high annual rainfall (proximity to the Csb), in terms of temperature is similar the Channel Islands. Summers are warm and almost fresh and winters are mild, one of the mildest in all of Canada.

Climate data for Port Renfrew Climate ID: 1016335; coordinates 48°35′30″N 124°19′35″W; elevation: 10.0 m (32.8 ft); 1981-2010 normals
Month	Jan	Feb	Mar	Apr	May	Jun	Jul	Aug	Sep	Oct	Nov	Dec	Year
Record high °C (°F)	19.0 (66.2)	16.5 (61.7)	20.0 (68.0)	24.5 (76.1)	27.5 (81.5)	31.0 (87.8)	31.7 (89.1)	33.5 (92.3)	28.9 (84.0)	24.0 (75.2)	17.2 (63.0)	15.0 (59.0)	33.5 (92.3)
Mean daily maximum °C (°F)	6.3 (43.3)	7.5 (45.5)	9.7 (49.5)	12.3 (54.1)	15.2 (59.4)	17.4 (63.3)	19.4 (66.9)	20.0 (68.0)	17.8 (64.0)	12.9 (55.2)	8.5 (47.3)	5.9 (42.6)	12.7 (54.9)
Daily mean °C (°F)	4.1 (39.4)	4.6 (40.3)	6.2 (43.2)	8.4 (47.1)	11.1 (52.0)	13.4 (56.1)	15.3 (59.5)	15.6 (60.1)	13.4 (56.1)	9.6 (49.3)	6.1 (43.0)	3.8 (38.8)	9.3 (48.7)
Mean daily minimum °C (°F)	1.8 (35.2)	1.6 (34.9)	2.7 (36.9)	4.3 (39.7)	6.9 (44.4)	9.4 (48.9)	11.0 (51.8)	11.1 (52.0)	9.0 (48.2)	6.3 (43.3)	3.7 (38.7)	1.6 (34.9)	5.8 (42.4)
Record low °C (°F)	−12.5 (9.5)	−10.5 (13.1)	−6.7 (19.9)	−2.5 (27.5)	0.0 (32.0)	1.7 (35.1)	5.0 (41.0)	2.2 (36.0)	−0.6 (30.9)	−3.5 (25.7)	−11.5 (11.3)	−11.1 (12.0)	−12.5 (9.5)
Average precipitation mm (inches)	555.7 (21.88)	376.6 (14.83)	362.3 (14.26)	258.7 (10.19)	154.7 (6.09)	107.9 (4.25)	50.5 (1.99)	82.4 (3.24)	123.9 (4.88)	371.2 (14.61)	579.7 (22.82)	481.0 (18.94)	3,504.6 (137.98)
Average rainfall mm (inches)	544.0 (21.42)	362.0 (14.25)	356.0 (14.02)	258.1 (10.16)	154.6 (6.09)	107.9 (4.25)	50.5 (1.99)	82.4 (3.24)	123.9 (4.88)	371.0 (14.61)	575.4 (22.65)	468.9 (18.46)	3,454.7 (136.01)
Average snowfall cm (inches)	11.8 (4.6)	14.6 (5.7)	6.3 (2.5)	0.6 (0.2)	0.1 (0.0)	0.0 (0.0)	0.0 (0.0)	0.0 (0.0)	0.0 (0.0)	0.2 (0.1)	4.3 (1.7)	12.1 (4.8)	50.0 (19.7)
Average precipitation days (≥ 0.2 mm)	22.8	18.4	22.3	19.3	16.7	13.9	9.0	9.6	11.1	18.8	23.1	22.4	207.3
Average rainy days (≥ 0.2 mm)	22.1	17.8	22.0	19.3	16.7	13.9	9.0	9.6	11.1	18.8	22.8	21.5	204.7
Average snowy days (≥ 0.2 cm)	2.9	2.2	2.0	0.33	0.04	0.0	0.0	0.0	0.0	0.08	1.0	2.5	11.1
Source: Environment and Climate Change Canada

== Attractions ==
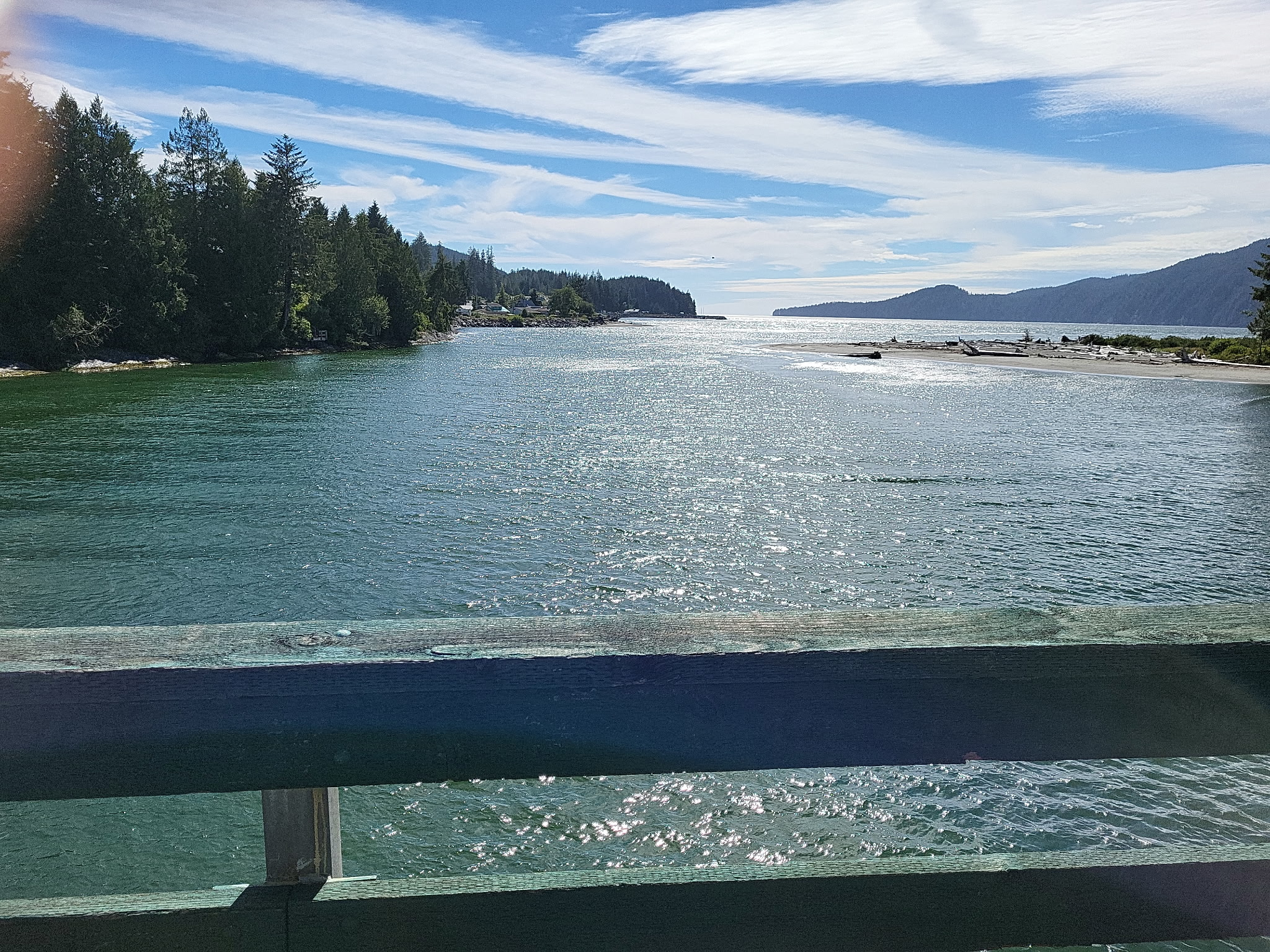
View West from the San Juan River Bridge

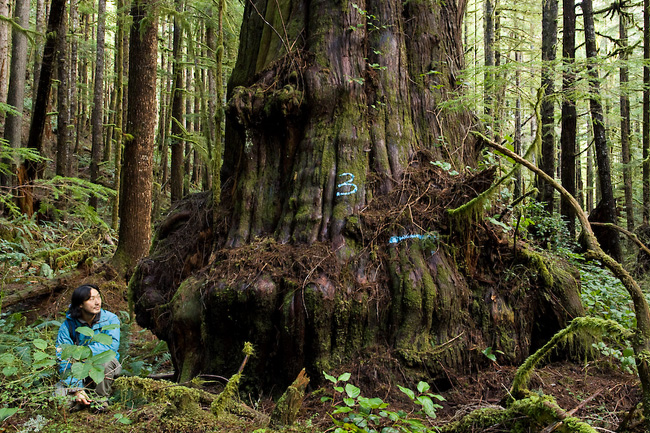
Avatar Grove

Port Renfrew sits at the head of Port San Juan and the mouth of the San Juan River, affording it a variety of recreational activities such as fishing, kayaking, birding, and walking. The surrounding mountains and coastline are home to a variety of hiking trails, most notably the West Coast Trail to the north and Juan de Fuca Marine Trail to the southwest. The San Juan Valley to the east is home to numerous old growth forests and many of Canada's largest and oldest trees, including the Red Creek Fir and Big Lonely Doug.

=== In town ===
- Government Wharf — western terminus of Highway 14
- Tall Tree Music Festival — held annually on the last weekend in June since 2010

=== Nearby ===
- Avatar Grove — old growth forest preserved by the Ancient Forest Alliance
- Juan de Fuca Provincial Park
- Pacific Rim National Park Reserve
- San Juan River Estuary Ecological Reserve

== See also ==
- List of communities in British Columbia
- Jordan River — a small settlement southeast of Port Renfrew
