= 350.org =

International environmental NGO

- Formation: 2007; 19 years ago
- Type: NGO
- Purpose: cut CO_{2} emissions and build a global movement for climate solutions
- Headquarters: Boston, Massachusetts
- Founders: Bill McKibben, Phil Aroneanu, Will Bates, Kelly Blynn, May Boeve, Jamie Henn and Jon Warnow
- Award: Right Livelihood Award
- Website: 350.org

350.org is an international environmental organization addressing the climate crisis. Its stated goal is to end the use of fossil fuels and transition to renewable energy by building a global, grassroots movement.

The 350 in the name stands for 350 parts per million (ppm) of carbon dioxide (CO_{2}), which has been identified as a safe upper limit to avoid a climate tipping point. By the end of 2007, the year 350.org was founded, atmospheric CO_{2} had already exceeded this threshold, reaching 383 ppm CO_{2}; as of July 2022, the concentration had reached 421 ppm CO_{2}, a level 50% higher than pre-industrial levels.

Through online campaigns, grassroots organizing, mass public actions, and collaboration with an extensive network of partner groups and organizations, 350.org mobilized thousands of volunteer organizers in over 188 countries. It was one of the many organizers of the September 2019 Global Climate Strike, which evolved from the Fridays for Future movement.

== Campaigns ==
350.org runs a variety of campaigns, from the local to the global scale.

=== Fossil fuel divestment ===
The fossil fuel divestment campaign, also known as "Fossil Free", borrows activist tactics from other social movements, notably the successful campaign for disinvestment from South Africa over apartheid. From its inception in 2012 through October 2021, over 1500 institutions with more than US$40.43 trillion in assets under management had committed to divest from fossil fuels.

350.org explains that the reasoning behind this campaign is simple: "If it is wrong to wreck the climate, then it is wrong to profit from that wreckage." 350.org states their demand as the following "We want institutions to immediately freeze any new investment in fossil fuel companies and divest from direct ownership and any commingled funds that include fossil-fuel public equities and corporate bonds."

The campaign has grown from colleges and universities around the United States to now include other kinds of public and private institutions, such as the City of New York, major Japanese banks, development banks, religious institutions, and more. Campaigns for divestment are active and growing around the world. From 2013 to 2020, Australian members built a network of local groups across the country advocating for institutions to divest.

=== Keystone XL pipeline ===
350.org named the Keystone XL pipeline as a critical issue and turning point for the environmental movement, as well as for then-President Barack Obama's legacy. NASA climatologist James Hansen labeled the Keystone XL pipeline as "game over" for the planet and called the amount of carbon stored in Canadian bitumen sands a "fuse to the largest carbon bomb on the planet".

350.org cited oil spills along the proposed pipeline route, which would pass near Texas' Carrizo-Wilcox Aquifer, which supplies drinking water to more than 12 million people, as one important reason to reject the pipeline. They argued that it could also pose a danger to the Ogallala Aquifer, the largest aquifer in western North America that supplies drinking water and irrigation to millions of people and agricultural businesses.

350.org has opposed the economic argument that has been made by proponents of the pipeline, arguing that Keystone XL would create only a few thousand temporary jobs during construction. The State Department estimated that ultimately the pipeline will create 35 permanent jobs. Additionally, the Natural Resources Defense Council (NRDC) has said that the Keystone XL pipeline will increase gas prices instead of lowering them as oil industry proponents claimed. The NRDC's study also rebutted the claim that the pipeline will lead to energy independence because the pipeline would carry tar sands from Canada to Texas for export to the global market.

Partly due to efforts from 350.org and other organizations, President Obama officially rejected the building of Keystone XL on November 6, 2015. This marked the end of a seven-year review of the pipeline. Speaking on the decision, Bill McKibben said, "President Obama is the first world leader to reject a project because of its effect on the climate. That gives him new stature as an environmental leader, and it eloquently confirms the five years and millions of hours of work that people of every kind put into this fight."

In response, proponent TC Energy filed a US$15 billion lawsuit under NAFTA's Chapter 11.

On January 24, 2017, President Donald Trump took action intended to permit the pipeline's completion, whereupon TC Energy suspended their NAFTA Chapter 11 action.

On January 18, 2018, TransCanada Pipelines (now TC PipeLines) announced they had secured commitments from oil companies to ship 500,000 barrels (79,000 m^{3}) of dilbit per day for 20 years, meeting the threshold to make the project economically viable.

On January 20, 2021, President Joe Biden revoked the permit for the pipeline on his first day in office. On June 9, 2021, the project was abandoned by TC Energy. In its coverage of the abandonment, The Wall Street Journal highlighted the role of 350.org in the project's failure.

=== Mountain Valley pipeline ===
On January 31, 2024, 350.org and international multifaith organization GreenFaith gathered in Charlotte, North Carolina, to oppose the Mountain Valley Pipeline which would carry gasoline and methane "more than 300 miles (480 km) from West Virginia to Southern Virginia", as well as the pipeline's 31-mile (50 km) Southgate Extension.

=== Fossil Fuel bans ===
Local campaigns in jurisdictions around the world have passed laws limiting or banning fossil fuel production. These include 410 municipal bans for fracking in Brazil and two state bans: Santa Catarina and Paraná.

=== International Day of Climate Action ===
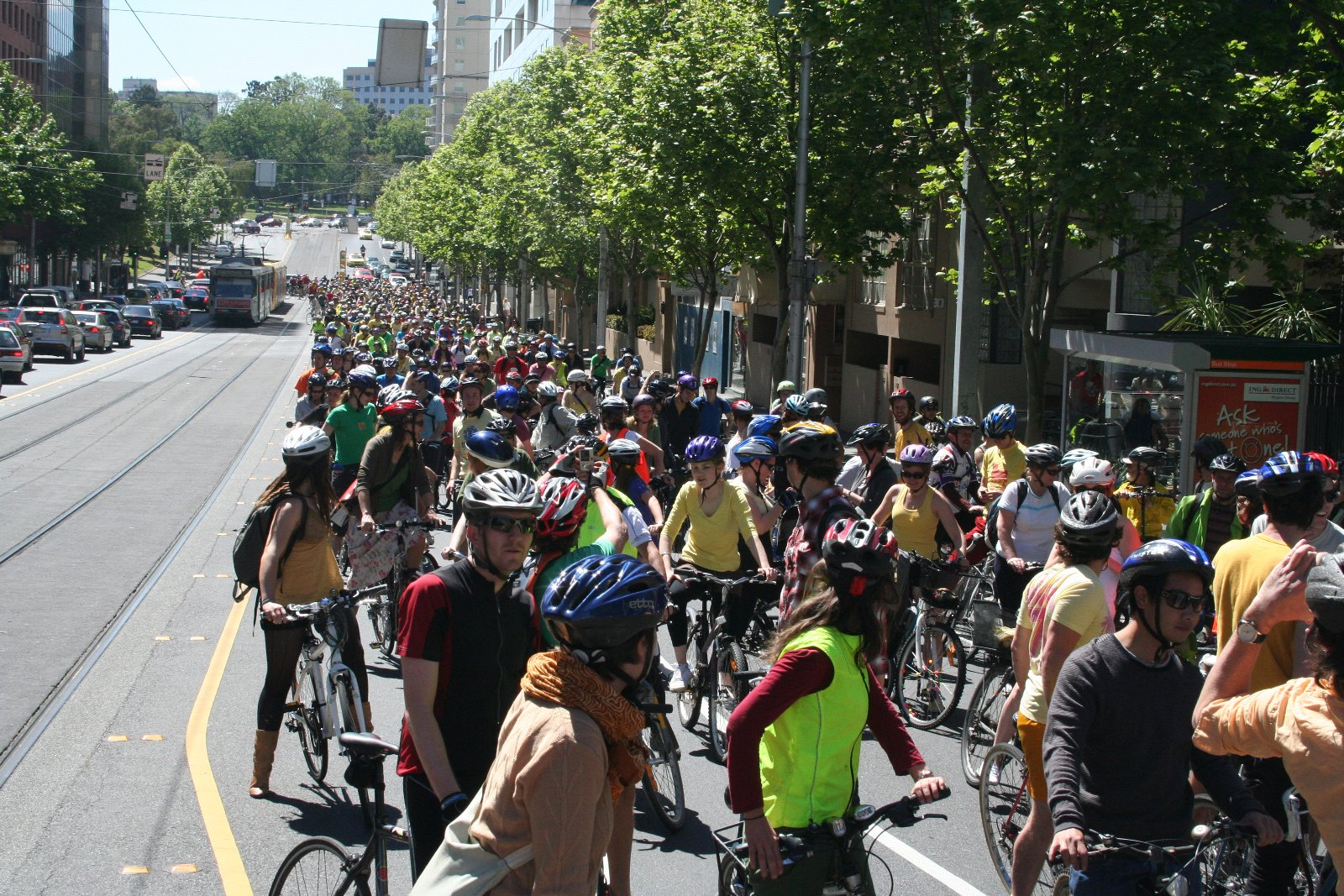
Thousands of Cyclists in Melbourne for the 350 Climate Protest, October 24, 2009

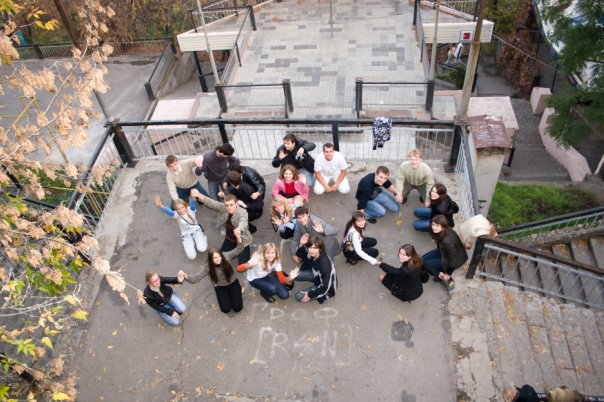
International Day of Climate Action. Taganrog, Rostov Region, Russia. October 24, 2009

An "International Day of Climate Action" on October 24, 2009, was organized by 350.org to influence the delegates going to the United Nations Framework Convention on Climate Change meeting in December 2009 (COP15). This was the first global campaign ever organized around a scientific data point. The actions organized by 350.org included gigantic depictions of the number "350", walks, marches, rallies, teach-ins, bike rides, sing-a-thons, carbon-free dinners, retrofitting houses to save energy, tree plantings, mass dives at the Great Barrier Reef, solar-cooked bake-outs, church bell ringings, underwater cabinet meetings (Maldives), and armband distributions to athletes. The group reported that they organized the world's "most widespread day of political action" on that Saturday, reporting 5,245 actions in 181 countries.

=== Global Work Party ===
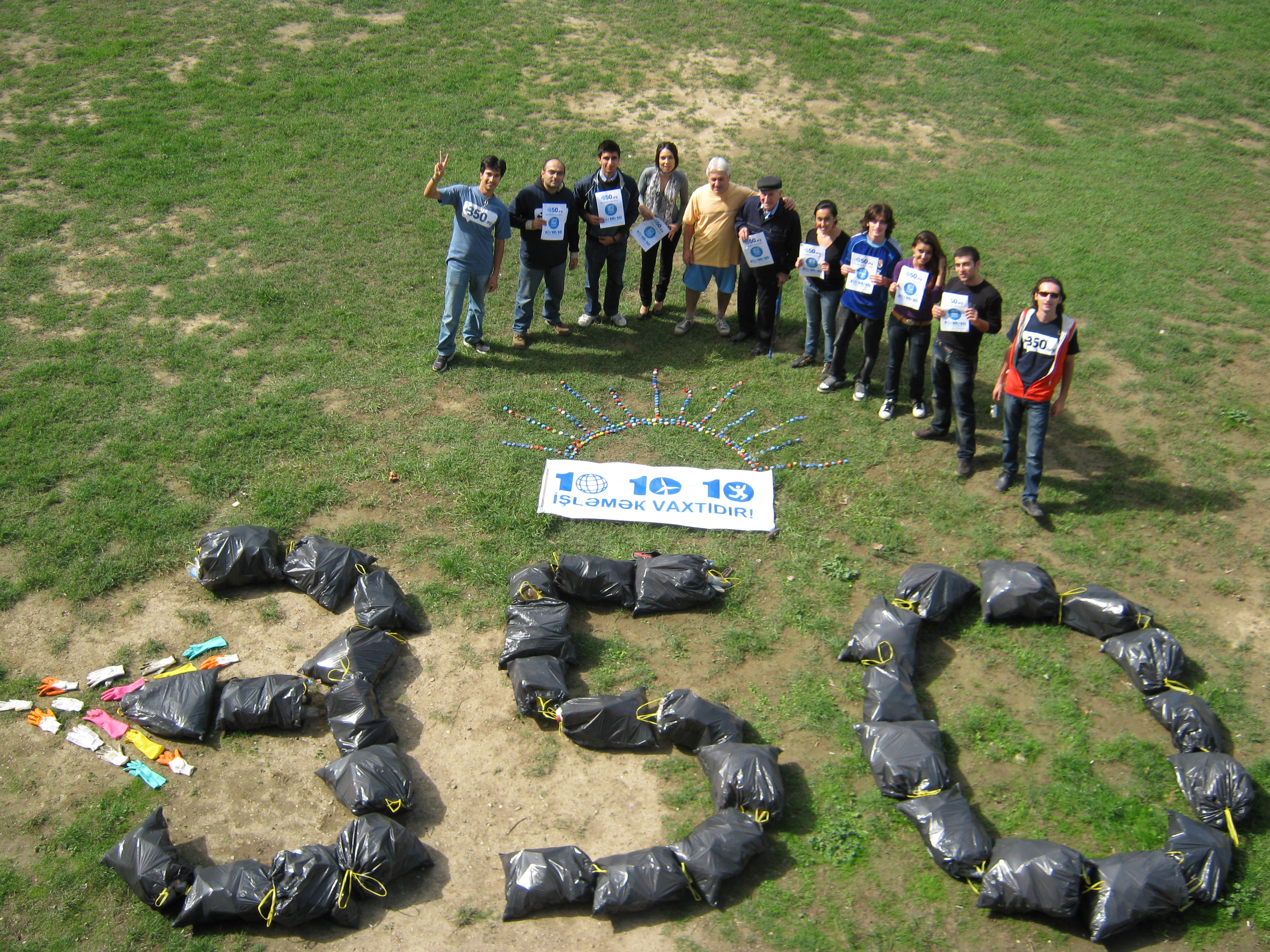
10.10.10. 350.org in Baku, Azerbaijan

As a follow-up to 2009's International Day of Climate Action, 350.org and the 10:10 Climate Campaign joined forces to help coordinate another global day of action, which occurred on October 10, 2010. The 2010 campaign was focused on concrete actions that can be taken locally to help combat climate change. Actions from tree-plantings to solar panel installations to huge electricity service-provider switching parties occurred in almost every country around the world.

=== Connect the dots ===
The organization's efforts continued into 2012 with a planned May 5 worldwide series of rallies under the slogan "Connect the Dots" to draw attention to the links between climate change and extreme weather. Per the 350.org website, the day is called "Climate Impacts Day".

=== Global Power Shift ===
Phase 1 of Global Power Shift was a convergence in Istanbul, Turkey, in June 2013 of about five-hundred climate organizers from 135 countries. Stated objectives include sharing and developing skills to organize movements, building upon existing plans to organize in-country Power Shift events after the kickoff event in Turkey, building political alignment and a clear theory of change, sharing experiences from different countries, formulating strategies to overcome challenges, and building relationships to strengthen regional and international cooperation and collaboration. Phase 2 of Global Power Shift involves the organizers who were in Turkey in June 2013 to bring home what they learned to organize summits, events, and mobilizations.

=== Summer Heat ===
350.org launched the Summer Heat campaign in the summer of 2013, a wave of mass mobilizations across the USA. Summer Heat actions took place at eleven locations: Richmond, California; Vancouver, Washington; Green River, Utah; Albuquerque, New Mexico; Houston, Texas; St. Ignace, Michigan; Warren, Ohio; Washington, D.C.; Camp David, Maryland; Somerset, Massachusetts; and Sebago Lake, Maine. Participants included grassroots organizers, labor unions, farmers, ranchers, environmental justice groups, and others. The slogan that was used for the Summer Heat campaign was As The Temperature Rises, So Do We.

=== People's Climate March ===
350.org helped organize the People's Climate March, which took place on September 21, 2014. 2,000 events took place around the world.

=== Global Climate Strike ===
350.org was one of the leading organizers of the Global Climate Strike, September 20–27, 2019. Strike actions were planned in more than 150 countries. Worn by a broad coalition of NGOs, unions, and social movements, the strikes were inspired by the school strikes of the Fridays for Future movement. Also supported is the digital climate strike, which calls for a shutdown or 'go green' of websites with redirection to coverage of the physical mobilizations.

The aim of the Global Climate Strike was to draw attention to the emergency climate crisis and to create pressure on politics, the media and the fossil fuel industry. The strikes were intended as a prelude to a permanent mass mobilization.

Over 7.6 million people across 185 countries participated in the mass mobilization event, making the Global Climate Strike the largest climate mobilization in history.

=== Other activities ===
Apart from special events, 350.org organizes actions on an ongoing basis to promote its message. These activities include tree plantings (350 trees in each instance) for biosequestration, promoting the term "350", publishing adverts in major newspapers calling for the target level of carbon dioxide to be lowered to 350 ppm, conducting polls on the subject of climate change, educating youth leaders, lobbying governments on the issue of carbon targets, and joining a campaign to establish a .eco top-level domain or "tld". In December 2009, the group petitioned the United States Environmental Protection Agency to set national limits for greenhouse gases using the Clean Air Act, asking the agency to cap atmospheric concentrations of carbon dioxide at 350 parts per million. The organization created and distributed a time-lapse video showing the recent retreat of Mendenhall Glacier in Alaska, graphically depicting the impacts of warming climates.

=== Do The Math movie ===
The Do The Math movie is a 42-minute documentary film about the rising movement to change the terrifying math of the climate crisis and challenge the fossil fuel industry. The math revolves around these three numbers: to stay below 2 degrees Celsius of global warming we can emit only 565 more gigatons of carbon dioxide versus the 2,795 gigatons held in proven reserves by fossil fuel corporations. This warming rise was agreed to in the 2009 Copenhagen Summit as a limit. NASA scientist James Hansen says "2 degrees of warming is actually a prescription for long-term disaster."

=== "Rise: From One Island to Another" poem ===
"Rise: From One Island to Another" is a poem and video project that showcases the impacts of sea level rise and the ways the climate crisis spans across national borders. The poem is written by two islanders, Kathy Jetn̄il-Kijiner from the Marshall Islands and Aka Niviâna from Greenland. Through their poetry, they draw connections between their realities of melting glaciers and rising sea levels.

350.org founder Bill McKibben writes that "[climate change] science is uncontroversial. But science alone can't make change, because it appeals only to the hemisphere of the brain that values logic and reason. We're also creatures of emotion, intuition, spark – which is perhaps why we should mount more poetry expeditions, put more musicians on dying reefs, make sure that novelists can feel the licking heat of wildfire."

"Rise" was created in 2018. The "Rise" film project team included photographer and photojournalist Dan Lin, freelance filmmaker Nick Stone, visual storyteller Rob Lau, and filmmaker Oz Go.

== Origins ==
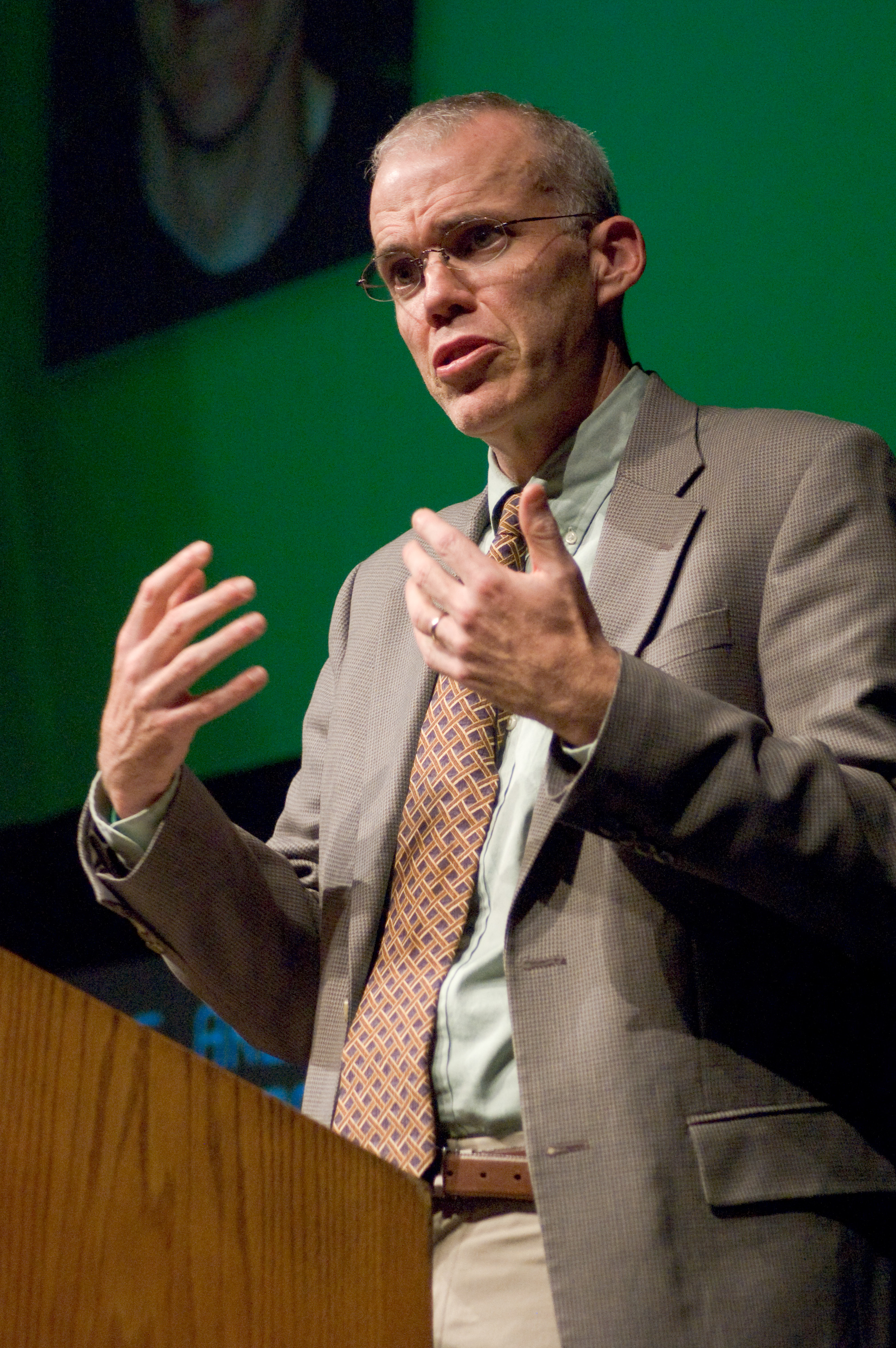
The founder of 350.org, Bill McKibben, speaking at the Rochester Institute of Technology in 2008

350.org was founded by American environmentalist Bill McKibben and a group of students from Middlebury College in Vermont. Their 2007 "Step It Up" campaign involved 1,400 demonstrations at famous sites across the United States. McKibben credits these activities with making Hillary Clinton and Barack Obama change their energy policies during the 2008 United States presidential campaign. Starting in 2008, 350.org built upon the "Step It Up" campaign and made it into a global organization.

McKibben is an American environmentalist and writer who wrote one of the first books on global warming for the general public, and frequently writes about climate change, alternative energy, and the need for more localized economies. As of 2022, McKibben was a senior advisor to 350.org and May Boeve is the Executive Director.

Rajendra Pachauri, the UN's "top climate scientist" and leader of the Intergovernmental Panel on Climate Change (IPCC), has come out, as have others, in favor of reducing atmospheric concentrations of carbon dioxide to 350 ppm. McKibben called news of Pachauri's embrace of the 350 ppm target "amazing". Some media have indicated that Pachauri's endorsement of the 350 ppm target was a victory for 350.org's activism.

The organization had a lift in prominence after McKibben appeared on The Colbert Report television show on August 17, 2009. McKibben promotes the organization on speaking tours and by writing articles about it for many major newspapers and media, such as the Los Angeles Times and The Guardian. In 2012, the organization was presented with the Katerva Award for Behavioural Change.

== Science of 350 ==
NASA climate scientist James Hansen contended that any atmospheric concentration of carbon dioxide (CO_{2}) above 350 parts per million (ppm) was unsafe. Hansen opined in 2009 that "if humanity wishes to preserve a planet similar to that on which civilization developed and to which life on Earth is adapted, paleoclimate evidence and ongoing climate change suggest that CO_{2} will need to be reduced from its current 400 ppm to at most 350 ppm, but likely less than that." Hansen has noted that nuclear energy is a viable solution to lower CO_{2} in the atmosphere, at odds with 350.org. Carbon dioxide, the main greenhouse gas, rose by 2.6 ppm to 396 ppm in 2013 from the previous year (annual global averages). In May 2013, two independent teams of scientists measuring CO_{2} near the summit of Mauna Loa in Hawaii recorded that the amount of carbon dioxide in the atmosphere exceeded 400 ppm, probably for the first time in more than 3 million years of Earth history. It crossed 415 ppm in May 2019 and the amount continues to rise.

2 °C (3.6 °F) was agreed upon during the 2009 Copenhagen Accord as a limit for global temperature rise. In the 2015 Paris Agreement, 1.5 °C of warming was introduced as a limit, reflecting the significant difference in impacts between 2 °C and 1.5 °C, especially for climate-vulnerable areas. This was reaffirmed in the 2018 report by the Intergovernmental Panel on Climate Change, where the world's leading scientists urged action to limit warming to 1.5 °C. In order to stay below a 2 °C increase, scientists have estimated that humans can pour roughly 565 more gigatons of carbon dioxide into the atmosphere.

Fossil-fuel companies have about 2,795 gigatons of carbon already contained in their proven coal and oil and gas reserves, and is the amount of fossil fuels they are currently planning to burn. 2,795 gigatons is five times higher than the limit of 565 gigatons that would keep Earth under a global temperature increase of 2 °C, which is already unsafe according to the latest science.

== Membership ==
350.org claims alliance with 300 organizations around the world. Many notable figures have publicly allied themselves with the organization or its goal to spread the movement, including Archbishop Desmond Tutu, Alex Steffen, Bianca Jagger, David Suzuki, and Colin Beavan.

1Sky merged into 350.org in 2011.

== See also ==
- 2010 United Nations Climate Change Conference
- Air pollution reduction efforts
- Climate change mitigation
- Climate change policy of the United States
- Climate Reality Project
- Conservation (ethic)
- Criticism of non-governmental organizations
- Environmental movement
- Individual and political action on climate change
- List of environmental issues
- NGO-ization
- Politics of global warming
- Stern Review
- Fossil Fuel Non-Proliferation Treaty Initiative
