= Tzeporah Berman =

Canadian environmental activist, campaigner and writer (b. 1969)

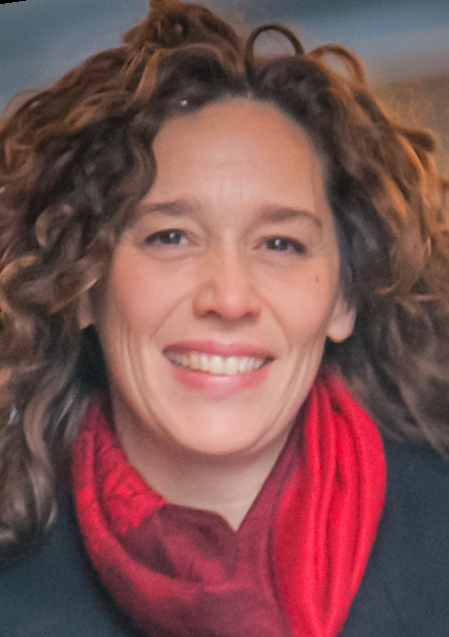
- Tzeporah Berman, 2009
- Born: 5 February 1969 (age 57); London, Ontario
- Education: University of Toronto; York University; University of British Columbia (UBC)
- Occupations: Environmental activist, campaigner, writer, Adjunct Professor
- Known for: first founder of the Fossil Fuel Treaty initiative, Co-Founder and Deputy Director, Stand.earth; Clayoquot Sound logging protests; co-director of Greenpeace International's Global Climate and Energy Program, Co-founder PowerUp Canada.
- Spouse: Chris Hatch
- Website: www.fossilfueltreaty.org

Tzeporah Berman (born 5 February 1969) is an environmental and climate policy expert and advocate. She is the founder and steering committee chair of the Fossil Fuel Non-Proliferation Treaty Initiative, a global network of nation states supported by civil society developing a companion to the Paris Agreement.

Berman is also the co-founder and international program director at Stand.earth (previously ForestEthics) where she works to help develop strategy for the Amazon, shipping, fashion, pipeline, LNG and old growth forests campaigns as well as the SAFE cities initiative. She is also known for her role as one of the organizers of the logging blockades in Clayoquot Sound, British Columbia in 1992–93.

In 2009, Berman served on British Columbia's Green Energy Task Force.

Berman was one of the experts in the environmental documentary The 11th Hour, produced by Leonardo DiCaprio. She was named as one of six Canadian nominees for the Schwab Foundation for Social Entrepreneurship social entrepreneur of the year award, one of "50 Visionaries Changing the World" in Utne Reader and as "Canada's Queen of Green" in a cover story by Reader's Digest. She was included in the Royal British Columbia Museum permanent exhibit of "150 people who have changed the face of British Columbia." In 2015 Berman served on the British Columbia Governments Climate Leadership Team and was appointed in 2016 to serve on the Alberta Governments Oil Sands Advisory Group as co-chair. Berman was listed of one of the 35 Most Influential Women in British Columbia by BC Business Magazine and awarded an Honorary Doctorate of Law from University of British Columbia.

Tzeporah is one of the primary negotiators and architects of the Great Bear Rainforest campaign in Canada that led to the permanent protection of 6 million hectares of old growth rainforest in 2006.

Berman is an adjunct professor at the Faculty of Environmental Studies, at York University in Toronto.

== Early life and education ==
Berman grew up in London, Ontario, the fourth of five siblings in a middle-class Jewish family. Her father owned a small advertising company and her mother had a business that made promotional flags and pennants. The family spent summers at her mother's family's cottage in Lake of the Woods. Her father died when Berman was in her early teens and her mother died two years later.

Berman earned her Bachelor of Arts at the University of Toronto, where she studied Environmental Studies at Innis College. She graduated with honours and received the Douglas Pimlott Award in recognition of academic excellence and contributions within the environmental studies program. Her undergraduate training combined interdisciplinary approaches to ecology, policy, and environmental ethics, forming the foundation for her later work in environmental advocacy and climate policy.

She subsequently earned a Master of Environmental Studies degree from York University, where she continued to focus on environmental policy, resource management, and climate-related issues. Her graduate studies further developed her expertise in environmental governance and activism, areas that would become central to her professional career.

Berman has also been awarded an honorary Doctor of Laws degree (LLD) from the University of British Columbia, in recognition of her contributions to environmental advocacy, climate leadership, and public policy engagement.

== Career and research ==
In 1992, Berman travelled to the Carmanah Valley on Vancouver Island to do fieldwork on threatened seabirds. The following year when she returned to continue her survey, she found that a logging crew had clear-cut the hillside. In 1993, the Clayoquot Sound Land Use Decision had granted pulp-and-paper giant MacMillan Bloedel rights to clear cut two thirds of a 650,000 acre lowland coastal temperate rainforest, the largest of its kind in the world. Berman joined with Valerie Langer and members of Friends of Clayoquot Sound in the growing Clayoquot protests.

That summer, Friends of Clayoquot Sound and Greenpeace launched blockades against the logging. Berman came to national and international attention as one of the spokespersons for the protests, which employed nonviolent civil disobedience tactics taught in a series of peace camps in Tofino and in high-profile locations such as Stanley Park in Vancouver. The blockades lasted for five months and became the largest act of civil disobedience in Canadian history; over 850 people were arrested.

Berman played a key role in the negotiations between MacMillan Bloedel (now owned by Weyerhaeuser), the activists and local First Nations. MacMillan Bloedel agreed to hand over its logging rights in Clayoquot Sound to Indigenous-controlled companies who would keep the old-growth forests intact.

By the late 1990s, Greenpeace had been successful in Europe using ad campaigns against companies engaging in practices considered damaging to the environment. In 2000, Berman co-founded ForestEthics, a group devoted to using tactics that would convince companies to change their ways or risk loss of sales. One of Berman's first successful actions was the Victoria's Secret campaign. The company had been printing a million copies per day of its glossy catalogues using paper from old-growth timber. The ForestEthics campaign initiated street-theatre demonstrations and fake fashion ads to force the undergarment manufacturer to consider changing its practices.

After a few weeks, Berman was able to negotiate different wood-pulp sources with company management. Similar campaigns targeting Staples and Office Depot led them to reconsider using old-growth timber. The strategy was not just to tell companies what they should stop doing, but rather "what they should continue doing and start doing in order to stay in business but avoid protests." Berman went on to be one of the lead negotiators in the Canadian Boreal Forest Agreement.

In 2004, Berman switched her focus to climate change, founding a nonprofit environmental organization called PowerUp Canada that worked successfully to create greater support in Canada for carbon pricing and defended the BC carbon tax from critics threatening to "axe the tax." In 2010 Berman was hired to Co-Direct Greenpeace International's Climate and Energy program in 40 countries. In that capacity she was the team leader for the creation of the Arctic campaign, contributed to the campaign to get Volkswagen to support vehicle efficiency regulations in the EU and ran a successful campaign against Facebook, on Facebook, to encourage the company to demand renewable energy in its procurement for data centers. Before leaving Greenpeace she helped to design and coordinate the "Clean Our Cloud" campaign that encouraged the largest IT companies in the world such as Apple and Google to demand and invest in renewable energy.

In 2007, Berman was one of the experts in Leonardo DiCaprio's environmental documentary 11th Hour, was one of six Canadian nominees for the Schwab Social Entrepreneur of the Year Award, and was profiled as one of 50 Visionaries Changing the World in Utne Reader and as "Canada's Queen of Green" in the cover story for Reader's Digest. She was honoured by inclusion into the BC Royal Museum permanent exhibit of one of 150 people who have changed the face of British Columbia.

Berman was appointed by the Premier of British Columbia to the Green Energy Task Force to design recommendations for the development of renewable energy in the region in 2009.

In 2012, Berman moved back to Canada and began consulting with philanthropic foundations, environmental organizations and First Nations on climate and energy policy and to design campaigns on oil sands and pipelines. Berman was appointed by the British Columbia Government to the Climate Leadership Team to make recommendations on climate policy in British Columbia in 2015. Then in 2016, she was appointed to be co-chair of the Oil Sands Advisory Group by the Alberta Government to make recommendations on implementing the new Climate Leadership Plan, reviewing cumulative impacts of oil sands operations and design climate recommendations for the pathway to 2050.

In 2018, Berman came on board with Stand.earth, formerly ForestEthics, as International Program Director. In 2020 she launched the Fossil Fuel Non-Proliferation Treaty Initiative, of which she is the chair.

In 2019, she was a recipient of the Climate Breakthrough Award, a philanthropic grant program providing multi-million-dollar support to individuals developing high-impact climate strategies. The award supported her work on advancing global initiatives aimed at restricting fossil fuel expansion and accelerating the transition away from coal, oil, and gas.

In October 2021, Berman delivered a TED Talk introducing and elaborating on the concept of a Fossil Fuel Non-Proliferation Treaty. The talk has since accumulated several million views and contributed to broader public visibility of the proposal as a framework for international cooperation on fossil fuel phase-out. Following this period, she has continued to develop and promote the initiative through diplomatic, civil society, and policy channels. The Fossil Fuel Non-Proliferation Treaty initiative has since evolved into a formal international proposal supported by a growing network of governments, civil society organizations, and public figures.Public campaign materials associated with the initiative report support from multiple nation-states engaged in discussions related to treaty principles, as well as endorsements from thousands of civil society organizations across more than 100 countries. The initiative has also been supported by a significant number of scientists, Nobel Laureates, and individuals worldwide through open letters and advocacy campaigns. The proposal remains in development as an emerging framework for international cooperation on fossil fuel phase-out and climate mitigation.

In 2021, Berman was arrested for blockading the logging of thousand year olds trees in Fairy Creek on Vancouver Island.

In 2026, Berman endorsed Avi Lewis in that year's federal NDP leadership race.

== Awards and accolades ==
In 2015, she was awarded the YWCA Women of Distinction Award in British Columbia.

In 2016, Tzeporah was appointed by the Alberta Government to co-chair the Oil Sands Advisory Working Group, tasked with making recommendations to implement climate change and cumulative impact policies and was listed as one of the 35 most influential women in British Columbia by BC Business Magazine.

In 2019, she received a $2 million Climate Breakthrough Award in 2019 to develop global climate strategy.

In 2024, she was named among Time's 100 Most Influential Climate Leaders and received Climate Scorecard Canada's Climate Leader Award.

In 2025, she was selected as a finalist for the WIN WIN Gothenburg Sustainability Award for Trailblazing Leadership.

== Selected works ==
=== Books ===
- Berman, Tzeporah, with Mark Leiren-Young. (2011). This Crazy Time: Living our environmental challenge. Toronto: Alfred A. Knopf Canada. ISBN 9780307399786
- Berman Tzeporah, Christopher Hatch; Maurice Gibbons; Ronald B. Hatch; Gordon Brent Ingram; Loys Maingon (1994). Clayoquot & Dissent. Ronsdale Press. ISBN 9780921870296

=== Articles ===
- Tzeporah Berman, Peter Newell, Matthew Stilwell (4 February 2020) Cold War lesson for the climate change era: Why we need a Fossil Fuel Non-Proliferation Treaty. Bulletin of the Atomic Scientists.
- Berman, Tzeporah (19 February 2013) Washington is right: Canada must confront its climate neglect. The Globe and Mail.
- Berman, Tzeporah (2 May 2012). Oil, dissent and the future of Canada. The Globe and Mail.
- Berman, Tzeporah (20 June 2023). Canada is on fire, and big oil is the arsonist. The Guardian
- Berman, Tzeporah (11 January 2025). Los Angeles is on fire and big oil are the arsonists. The Guardian

== See also ==
- Fossil Fuel Non-Proliferation Treaty Initiative
- Great Bear Rainforest
- Greenpeace
- Stand.earth
