= Lofoten Declaration =

2017 International manifesto against expansion of fossil fuel reserves

The Lofoten Declaration, drafted in August 2017, is an international manifesto calling for the end of hydrocarbon exploration and further expansion of fossil fuel reserves for climate change mitigation. It calls for fossil fuel divestment and phase-out of use with a just transition to a low-carbon economy. A diverse group of signatories has signed the declaration, affirming demands for early leadership in efforts from the economies that have benefited the most from fossil fuel extraction. The Declaration was named for the Lofoten archipelago where public concern has successfully prevented offshore development of petroleum reserves.

Signed by 600 organizations spanning 76 countries, the Declaration is believed to have helped influence the government of Norway to divest from investment in exploration and production.

The Lofoten Declaration also helped mobilize efforts for a global treaty on a managed decline of fossil fuel production, such as the Fossil Fuel Non-Proliferation Treaty Initiative.
