= María Reyes =

María Reyes may refer to:

- María Reyes (archer), Puerto Rican archer
- María Camila Reyes, Colombian footballer
- María Reyes Sobrino, Spanish race walker
- Maria Reyes (climate activist), Mexican ecofeminist and climate activist
