= Fossil Fuel Non-Proliferation Treaty Initiative =

Diplomatic and civil society campaign

- Formation: September 2020
- Chair: Tzeporah Berman
- Steering committee: Andrea Reimer, Andrew Simms, Rev. James Bhagwan, Fleur Ramsay, Carlos Larrea, Carroll Muffett, Catherine Abreu, Lidy Nacpil, Lili Fuhr, Loukina Tille, Mark Campanale, Matthew Stilwell, May Boeve, Meena Raman, Mitzi Jonelle Tan, Mohamed Adow, Niranjali Amerasinghe, Osprey Orielle Lake, Peter Newell, Dr Richard Denniss, Sanjay Vashist, Simon Taylor, Tasneem Essop, Tom Goldtooth, Tzeporah Berman, Eric Njuguna, Maria Reyes
- Website: fossilfueltreaty.org

The Fossil Fuel Non-Proliferation Treaty Initiative is a joint diplomatic and civil society campaign to create a treaty to stop fossil fuel exploration and expansion and phase-out existing production in line with the targets of the Paris Climate Agreement, while supporting a just transition to renewable energy.

The call for a treaty was first endorsed by the Pacific Island nations of Vanuatu and Tuvalu and to date, has the support of 17 national governments, the World Health Organization, the European Parliament, Nobel laureates, academics, researchers, activists, and a growing list of governments (municipal, subnational, national), and individual Parliamentarians.

The program includes the creation of a standalone Global Registry of Fossil Fuels to ensure transparency and accountability of production and reserves.

== History ==
In 2015, Pacific Island leaders issued the "Suva Declaration On Climate Change" during the Pacific Islands Development Forum in Suva, Fiji. They called for "the implementation of an international moratorium on the development and expansion of fossil fuel extracting industries, particularly the construction of new coal mines, as an urgent step towards de-carbonising the global economy." The next year, in 2016, 14 Pacific Island nations continued to discuss the world's first "treaty" that would ban new coal mining and embrace the 1.5 °C goal set at the recent Paris climate talks.

In August 2017, a group of academics, activists, and analysts issued the Lofoten Declaration which stressed that climate policy and governance required a managed decline of fossil fuel production. The international manifesto called for fossil fuel divestment and phase-out of use with a just transition to a low-carbon economy. The declaration received the support of 744 organizations, spanning 76 countries and helped mobilize efforts for a global treaty on fossil fuel production. The government of Norway divested from exploration and production shortly afterward.

At the closing of United Nations Climate Change Conference, on 17 November 2017, the Democratic Republic of Ethiopia made a final statement on behalf of Least Developed Countries (LDC), which they stressed the need for "an increase in ambition by all countries to put us on track to limit the global temperature increase to 1.5 °C by strengthening our national contributions, managing a phase-out of fossil fuels, promoting renewable energy and implementing the most ambitious climate action."

A year later, on 23 October 2018, Peter Newell and Andrew Simms, academics at the University of Sussex, wrote an op-ed in The Guardian that renewed these public calls for a "treaty": This time they presented the treaty idea as a "Fossil Fuel Non-Proliferation Treaty." While the Intergovernmental Panel on Climate Change (IPCC) advised reducing carbon emissions 45% by 2030 to hold global temperature rise below 1.5 °C, global demand for coal, oil and gas has continued to grow. Newell and Simms noted that fossil fuels accounted for 81% of energy use in 2018 with forecasts, including those by the International Energy Agency, anticipating greater demand in future decades. As a historical precedent for a fossil fuel non-proliferation treaty, Newell and Simms cited the Toronto Conference on the Changing Atmosphere in 1988, where the threat of "climatic upheaval" was compared "second only to nuclear war"—a sentiment endorsed at the time by the CIA, MI5, United Nations. In 2019 and 2020, Newell and Simms continued to write and publish on the Treaty in non-specialist news and academic journals.

== Launch ==
The Fossil Fuel Non-Proliferation Treaty Initiative officially launched at Climate Week NYC on September 25, 2020, at an event called "International Cooperation to Align Fossil Fuel Production with a 1.5°C World."

Tzeporah Berman, a Canadian environmental activist, was named the chair of the Treaty Initiative, and Alex Rafalowicz, the director of the Treaty Initiative. Berman has argued that by "explicitly addressing the supply side of the climate crisis, the Fossil Fuel Non-Proliferation Treaty offers a way for countries to shift course." Berman has since argued that the Treaty would be a more genuine and realistic way to achieve the goals of the Paris Agreement than the "net zero" approach which, she claimed, is "delusional and based on bad science." As Rafalowicz has put it, the "Treaty aims to be a complementary mechanism to the Paris Agreement by directly addressing the fossil fuel industry and putting the just transition at its core." "The hope many academics, researchers, and activists have is that an international agreement to prevent the expansion of fossil fuels, to manage a fair global phase-out, and to guide a just transition could be used to preserve a planet that can support human life." "The Treaty aims to be a complementary mechanism to the Paris Agreement by directly addressing the fossil fuel industry and putting the just transition at its core," according to Rafalowicz.

=== Letter to world leaders ===
On 21 April 2021, the Treaty Initiative coordinated a letter signed by 100 Nobel laureates, including scientists, peace makers, writers, and the Dalai Lama, urging world leaders "to take concrete steps to phase out fossil fuels in order to prevent catastrophic climate change."

The open letter referenced the importance of both the United Nations Framework Convention on Climate Change and the 2015 Paris Agreement which aims to limit global warming to "well below" 2 °C and, ideally, restrict any rise to 1.5 °C, compared to pre-industrial levels. It noted that failure to meet the 1.5 °C target would risk "pushing the world towards catastrophic global warming." It also added that the Paris Agreement makes no mention of oil, gas or coal. The letter highlighted a report from the United Nations Environment Programme, stating that "120% more coal, oil, and gas will be produced by 2030 than is consistent with limiting warming to 1.5°C."

The letter concluded that the expansion of the fossil fuel industry "is unconscionable ... The fossil fuel system is global and requires a global solution—a solution the Leaders' Climate Summit must work towards. And the first step is to keep fossil fuels in the ground."

The open letter, published a day before U.S. President Joe Biden hosted the virtual 2021 Leaders' Climate Summit with leaders from various countries, described the burning of fossil fuels as "by far the major contributor to climate change."

Alongside the Dalai Lama, signatories to the letter included Jody Williams, the International Campaign to Ban Landmines' founding coordinator; the economist Christopher Pissarides; Shirin Ebadi, the first female judge in Iran; and former Colombian President Juan Manuel Santos. Other names included Liberian peace activist and advocate for women's rights, Leymah Gbowee, and Wole Soyinka, the Nigerian playwright, novelist and poet.

== Global registry of fossil fuels ==
In February 2021, Carbon Tracker, a UK-based think tank, and Global Energy Monitor, a US-based research organization, announced the creation of an independent and standalone Global Registry of Fossil Fuels. The Registry is supported by the Treaty as an important step in ensuring transparency and accountability in fossil fuel production and reserves. The registry is built on Global Energy Monitor's infrastructure data for coal mines, coal mine reservers, and coal mine methane emissions, and oil and gas extraction sites and reserves.

Mark Campanale, the founder and executive director of Carbon Tracker, wrote in the Financial Times that the registry "will allow governments, investors, researchers and civil society organisations, including the public, to assess the amount of embedded CO_{2} in coal, oil and gas projects globally. It will be a standalone tool and can provide a model for a potential UN-hosted registry."

At the 2021 United Nations Climate Change Conference, Ted Nace, executive director of Global Energy Monitor, said "The development of this dataset is the first step in a virtuous circle of transparency. The more the inventory of carbon in the ground advances, the more useful it will become and the greater the pressure on countries and companies for full transparency."

== Prospective role in international agreements ==
On Jan 31, 2023, journalist Gaye Taylor reported that, "ten years after Ecuador abandoned efforts to get the international community to pay it not to drill for oil in a corner of Yasuní National Park, one of the most biodiverse places on Earth, the cash-strapped country's decision to double down on fossil exploration is signalling the need for a global fossil fuel non-proliferation agreement." A reassessment of that abandoned Yasuní-ITT Initiative points to the broader issue of how the Fossil Fuel Non-proliferation Treaty could be built and implemented as an international agreement and a compliance mechanism for a more fair fossil fuel phase-out.

== Political feasibility and challenges ==
Theoretical analysis of a supply-side climate treaty suggests that 'distributive conflict' remains a primary obstacle to its effectiveness. This conflict arises from the fact that climate-change mitigation creates new economic winners and losers, particularly impacting states where carbon-intensive industries hold significant instrumental and structural power. For a supply-side treaty to be directly effective, it must satisfy three criteria: stable participation from all major producers, deep commitments to substantial production cuts, and high compliance rates supported by a potent enforcement system.

== Growth and government endorsements ==
=== 2021 ===
On 11 November, at the 2021 United Nations Climate Change Conference, "a group of young climate activists delivered a sharp rebuke to delegates at the COP26 climate summit...demanding that a fossil fuel non-proliferation treaty be put in place and calling out global leaders for their continued closeness to the coal, oil and gas industries...The activists did not mince their words when they took over the stage at the Glasgow conference, pointing out the absurdity of the fact that the very mentioning of "fossil fuels" in the meeting's agreement has become a sticking point. No COP agreement has ever mentioned fossil fuels as the main driver of the climate crisis.... The youth and the leaders of the Fridays for Future group [had] joined the already established Fossil Fuel Non-Proliferation Treaty Initiative, a network of civil society organizations pushing for a speedy and just phaseout of fossil fuels."

=== 2022 ===
At the 2022 United Nations Climate Change Conference, Vanuatu and Tuvalu became the first countries to endorse a fossil fuel non proliferation treaty. Tuvalu's Prime Minister Kausea Natano in his speech stated "We all know that the leading cause of climate crisis is fossil fuels", " we have joined Vanuatu and other nations calling for a fossil fuels non-proliferation treaty… It's getting too hot and there is very (little) time to slow and reverse the increasing temperature. Therefore, it is essential to prioritize fast acting strategies that avoids the most warming."

=== 2023 ===
In early 2023, the Pacific Island nations of Fiji, Tonga, Solomon Islands and Niue joined Vanuatu and Tuvalu to issue the Port Vila Call for a Just Transition to a Fossil Fuel Free Pacific, which included the call for the development of a Fossil Fuel Treaty. The Governments of Timor-Leste and Antigua & Barbuda joined the call for a Fossil Fuel Treaty later that year during the UN General Assembly in September. At the 2023 United Nations Climate Change Conference, Palau, Colombia, and Samoa all formally endorsed the treaty. On the 1 December, over 100 cities and subnational governments voiced their support for the treaty.

=== 2024 ===
At the 2024 SIDS Conference, the Marshall Islands formally endorsed the treaty and were joined by the Federated States of Micronesia in September later in the year during the UN General Assembly. Both Pakistan and The Bahamas joined this call in December, bringing the total number of countries working towards the development of a Fossil Fuel Non-Proliferation Treaty to 15 in early 2025.

=== 2026 ===
In April 2026, the first International Conference on Transitioning Away from Fossil Fuels was held in Santa Marta, Colombia. The conference was co-hosted by Colombia and the Netherlands, with 57 countries participating. Participating countries generate about one-third of global economic activity, with almost all participating nations being democracies. Representatives from indigenous groups, civil society, youth, and subnational authorities such as California also participated.

== Public Endorsements ==
As of February 11, 2022, the initiative "has been supported by 101 Nobel Laureates, 2,600 academics, 170 parliamentarians, hundreds of prominent youth leaders, a growing group of faith leaders, and more than 1,300 civil society organisations, including Catalyst 2030, Limaatzuster, Citizens' Climate Europe, Both Ends and Fridays for Future Leeuwarden."

On July 21, 2022, the treaty was endorsed by senior members of the Vatican curia. On September 14, 2022, the World Health Organization, along with nearly 200 other health organizations endorsed the treaty. On October 20, 2022, the European Parliament endorsed the initiative.

As of December 2, 2023, 95 cities and subnational governments have either formally endorsed the Fossil Fuel Non-Proliferation Treaty or signed the Mayors Declaration. In early 2023, Pacific civil society organisations came together in Nadi, Fiji to issue the Naiuli Declaration - the first endorsement of the Fossil Fuel Treaty by an entire region's civil society groups.

=== Scientists and academics ===
As of September 14, 2021, the Fossil Fuel Non-Proliferation Treaty Initiative has received the endorsement of 2,185 scientists and researchers from 81 countries.

=== Cities ===
City	Location	Date of endorsement
Vancouver	Canada	9 October 2020
Barcelona	Spain	20 January 2021
Los Angeles	USA	21 April 2021
Yakima, Washington	USA	1 June 2021
Toronto	Canada	15 July 2021
Sydney	Australia	16 August 2021
Dhulikhel	Nepal	7 October 2021
Bonn	Germany	10 December 2021
Burnaby	Canada	27 Jan 2022
Itahari	Nepal	3 February 2022
Amsterdam	Netherlands	11 Feb 2022
Edinburgh	Scotland	16 March 2022
Grenoble	France	7 February 2022
Buenos Aires	Costa Rica	25 November 2021
Siquirres	Costa Rica	25 November 2021
Tilarán	Costa Rica	25 November 2021
Turrialba	Costa Rica	25 November 2021
Curridabat	Costa Rica	25 November 2021
Santa Ana	Costa Rica	25 November 2021
Montes de Oca	Costa Rica	25 November 2021
Lima	Peru	22 August 2022
New Westminster, BC	Canada	13 December 2021
District of North Vancouver	Canada	13 December 2021
West Vancouver	Canada	22 November 2021
Victoria, British Columbia	Canada	12 May 2022
Port Moody, British Columbia	Canada	14 June 2022
Powell River, British Columbia	Canada	21 July 2022
Richmond, British Columbia	Canada	12 May 2022
Paris	France	23 March 2022
Montreal	Canada	25 April 2022
London	United Kingdom	28 June 2022
Birmingham	United Kingdom	18 March 2022
Cambridge	United Kingdom	21 October 2021
Hastings	United Kingdom	13 July 2022
Lewes	United Kingdom	21 November 2022
Ottawa	Canada	6 July 2022
Kolkata	India	15 September 2022
Warsaw	Poland	20 January 2023
Hayward, California	USA	1 June 2021
Key West, Florida	USA	14 December 2023
Bethlehem, New York	USA	17 June 2022
Sebastopol, California	USA	18 October 2022
Austin, Texas	USA	8 June 2023
Belém	Brazil	10 November 2022
Belmopan	Belize	12 September 2022
Wellington	Aotearoa/New Zealand	14 December 2023
Hobart	Australia	1 December 2023
Somerset, Maryland	USA	6 July 2021
Richmond, California	USA	24 May 2022
Santa Ana, California	USA	7 September 2021
Turin	Italy	13 December 2022
Rome	Italy	10 July 2023
Amber Valley Borough Council	United Kingdom	31 March 2021
City of Merri-bek, Melbourne	Australia	12 May 2021
Australian Capital Territory	Australia	3 June 2021
City of Yarra, Melbourne	Australia	20 July 2021
City of Maribyrnong, Melbourne	Australia	22 October 2021
West Vancouver, British Columbia	Canada	8 November 2021
Brighton and Hove	United Kingdom	3 February 2022
Islands Trust, British Columbia	Canada	23 June 2022
Gatineau, Quebec	Canada	18 October 2022
View Royal, British Columbia	Canada	1 March 2023
Portland, Maine	USA	24 August 2023
Dún Laoghaire–Rathdown	Ireland	11 September 2023
Kāpiti Coast District, Melbourne	Aotearoa/New Zealand	10 October 2023
Metchosin, British Columbia	Canada	26 March 2024
Reading	United Kingdom	22April 2024
City of Newcastle	Australia	23 April 2024
Kingston	Jamaica	24 April 2024
Castries	Saint Lucia	24 April 2024
Glasgow	Scotland	22 November 2024
Lilongwe	Malawi	22 August 2024
Mzuzu	Malawi	22 August 2024
Philadelphia, Pennsylvania	USA	26 September 2024
Stroud District	United Kingdom	29 October 2024
Dublin	Ireland	4 December 2024
Manchester	United Kingdom	5 December 2024
Freetown	Sierra Leone	10 December 2024

See also SAFE Cities.

=== Sub-national regional governments ===
Government	Location	Date of endorsement
Australian Capital Territory	Australia	2 June 2021
Hawaii	US	5 May 2022
California	US	1 September 2023

=== National governments ===
Government	Date of endorsement
Vanuatu	23 September 2022
Tuvalu	8 November 2022
Tonga	17 March 2023
Fiji	17 March 2023
Niue	17 March 2023
Solomon Islands	17 March 2023
East Timor	23 September 2023
Antigua and Barbuda	23 September 2023
Palau	1 December 2023
Colombia	2 December 2023
Samoa	4 December 2023
Nauru	11 December 2023
Marshall Islands	28 May 2024
The Bahamas	18 December 2024
Pakistan	18 December 2024

=== Multi-National Organizations ===
Organization	Date of endorsement
European Parliament	20 October 2022

=== International organizations ===
Organization	Date of endorsement
World Health Organization	14 September 2022

== See also ==
- Powering Past Coal Alliance
- Fossil fuel phase-out
- Special Report on Global Warming of 1.5 °C
- Treaty on the Non-Proliferation of Nuclear Weapons
- Stand.earth
- Global Covenant of Mayors for Climate and Energy
