= Pampa Wind Project =

Mesa Power LP, a company controlled by former Texas oilman, T. Boone Pickens, had planned to build the world's largest wind farm, called the Pampa Wind Project, as part of the Pickens Plan. The proposed 4,000 MW facility was to be located near Pampa, Texas, which is on the Texas Panhandle, and stretch to the east, spanning 400,000-acre (160,000 ha) in five counties. This would provide enough power for 1.5 million average residences. Mesa Power placed an order for 667 wind turbines from General Electric — the world's largest wind turbine order for a single location. The first phase of the project, 1000 MW, was intended to go online before 2011 before the project was ultimately cancelled in January 2010. Lease payments for the land used by the turbines were expected to cost $65 million a year. The total cost of the project was estimated at $8–10 billion.

By way of comparison, as of May 2008, the largest wind plant in the United States was the Horse Hollow Wind Energy Center, with a capacity of 736 MW.

On March 2, 2009, Mesa announced that it was proceeding with the first phase of the project, but had put off work on the later phases, and canceled 120 of 197 wind leases. In July 2009, Pickens delayed the project, but did not cancel it, citing the lack of transmission capacity to the site and a poor credit market. The following January, the project was cancelled completely. Declining prices for natural gas were cited as a reason for the decision. The order for the wind turbines was cut in half and the turbines were to be used in projects in Minnesota and Ontario, Canada.
