= International Conference on Transitioning Away from Fossil Fuels =

Conference planning a phase-out of fossil fuels

International Conferences on Transitioning Away from Fossil Fuels
- Abbreviation: TAFF
- Purpose: Fossil fuel phase-out
- Inaugurated: April 24, 2026
- Most recent: April 29, 2026; 6 months ago
- Next event: July 2027; 8 months' time
- Organiser: Fossil Fuel Non-Proliferation Treaty Initiative
- Website: transitionawayconference.com

The International Conference on Transitioning Away from Fossil Fuels (TAFF) (also known as the Santa Marta Process) is one of a series of international conferences for planning a phase-out of fossil fuels (oil, natural gas, and coal) in an effort to reduce climate change, and to avoid the high prices, insecurity, volatility, conflict and instability associated with fossil fuels.

These fossil fuel phase-out-related conferences complement the annual United Nations Climate Change Conference (also known as the Conference of the Parties or COP) held under the United Nations Framework Convention on Climate Change (UNFCCC) negotiation process to collaboratively address climate change. The TAFF process is designed for countries to create an alternative diplomatic venue that can't be obstructed by fossil fuel-producing countries, like the United States, Saudi Arabia and Russia. The UNFCCC relies on consensus to achieve progress in the negotiations, where all countries have to agree on the text; thus energy-rich can obstruct progress.

== Background ==
The conferences were born of frustration with the yearly United Nations climate conferences (COP, Conference of the Parties) that began in 1995. At COP conferences, all countries must agree on the language of any agreement, so fossil fuel-producing countries can oppose given language in the text and energy-rich nations can derail efforts to slow fossil fuel use. COP conferences traditionally focus on cutting greenhouse gas emissions, rather than directly addressing fossil fuel production. Greenhouse gas emissions from military operations, such as those in Ukraine (2022–) and Iran (2026), are not accurately accounted for under the 2015 Paris Agreement that was negotiated at COP 21. At COP28 (2023), countries agreed to transition away from fossil fuels, but did not agree on how. At COP 30 (2025), 80 countries supported phasing out fossil fuels but the conference ended without a plan.

The new multilateral process is the brainchild of the Fossil Fuel Treaty Initiative, an alliance of national and sub-national governments and civil society working to secure a global just transition from coal, oil and gas. The conferences' focus on fossil fuels complements, but does not replace, the work of COP climate change conferences.

== First conference (Santa Marta, 2026) ==
The First International Conference on Transitioning Away from Fossil Fuels—also called The Santa Marta Conference—was held from 24–29 April 2026 in Santa Marta, Colombia. The conference was co-hosted by Colombia and the Netherlands, with 57 countries participating.

Participating countries generate about one-third of global economic activity, with almost all participating nations being democracies: Germany, the United Kingdom, France, Italy, Brazil, Canada, Mexico, Australia, Spain, Turkey, Vietnam, the Philippines, Bangladesh, Nigeria and Kenya were among the participants. Representatives from indigenous groups, civil society, youth, and subnational authorities such as California also participated. The United States (the largest oil and gas producer and largest consumer of oil) and China (the largest consumer of coal) did not participate. Colombian environment minister Irene Vélez Torres said that, to avoid rehashing COP 30 debates, countries including China, Russia and the US were not invited.

A "science pre-conference" attended by 400 global academics from 24–25 April conceived a scientific panel designed to quickly provide country-specific analyses to nations wanting to accelerate their transition. The scientific panel was seen as necessary to combat the climate and energy disinformation populating the media. The next day involved a meeting for subnational governments, parliamentarians and other stakeholders. Finally, a high-level segment for ministers and climate envoys was held on 28–29 April. The conference's format was less formal than that of COP conferences.

'Suicidal' model of capitalism

There is inertia in the power and the economy of this archaic form of energy—fossil fuels—that lead to death. Undoubtedly, that form of capital can commit suicide, taking with it humanity and [other] life. The question that needs to be asked is whether capitalism can truly adapt to a non-fossil energy model.

— Gustavo Petro, President of Colombia, in late April 2026
First International Conference on
Transitioning Away from Fossil Fuels

Financing was seen as the main barrier to progress, with less wealthy countries having been forced into fossil fuel projects to feed their debt. Some developing nations' borrowing costs for renewable energy projects can be several times higher than in wealthier economies, making it cheaper in the short term to continue investing in oil and gas—the "debt-fossil fuel trap". Various participants recognized goals, not only to mitigate climate change, but also to avoid the high prices, insecurity, volatility, conflict and instability associated with fossil fuels. Participants sought to plan efforts for reducing fossil fuel production, for decarbonizing trade, and for formally launching the new scientific panel on the energy transition.

More specific plans included moving subsidies for fossil fuels to renewable energy and batteries, and finding employment for those presently working in the fossil fuel sector. Though 18 nations supported the concept of a legally binding agreement to control fossil fuel use, the conference concluded without such an agreement.

Looking forward, a first planned "workstream" was to develop national and regional "roadmaps" that are connected to countries' UN climate plans (nationally determined contributions, NDCs). The second workstream was to change the financial system—targeting fossil fuel subsidies and avoiding debt traps and economic dependencies. The final workstream involved advancing toward a fossil fuel-free trade system.

== Second conference (Tuvalu, 2027) ==
At the 2026 conference, Tuvalu and Ireland announced they would co-host the next conference on the Polynesian island of Tuvalu, which is facing rising sea levels.
