= Jamie Henn =

British climate activist

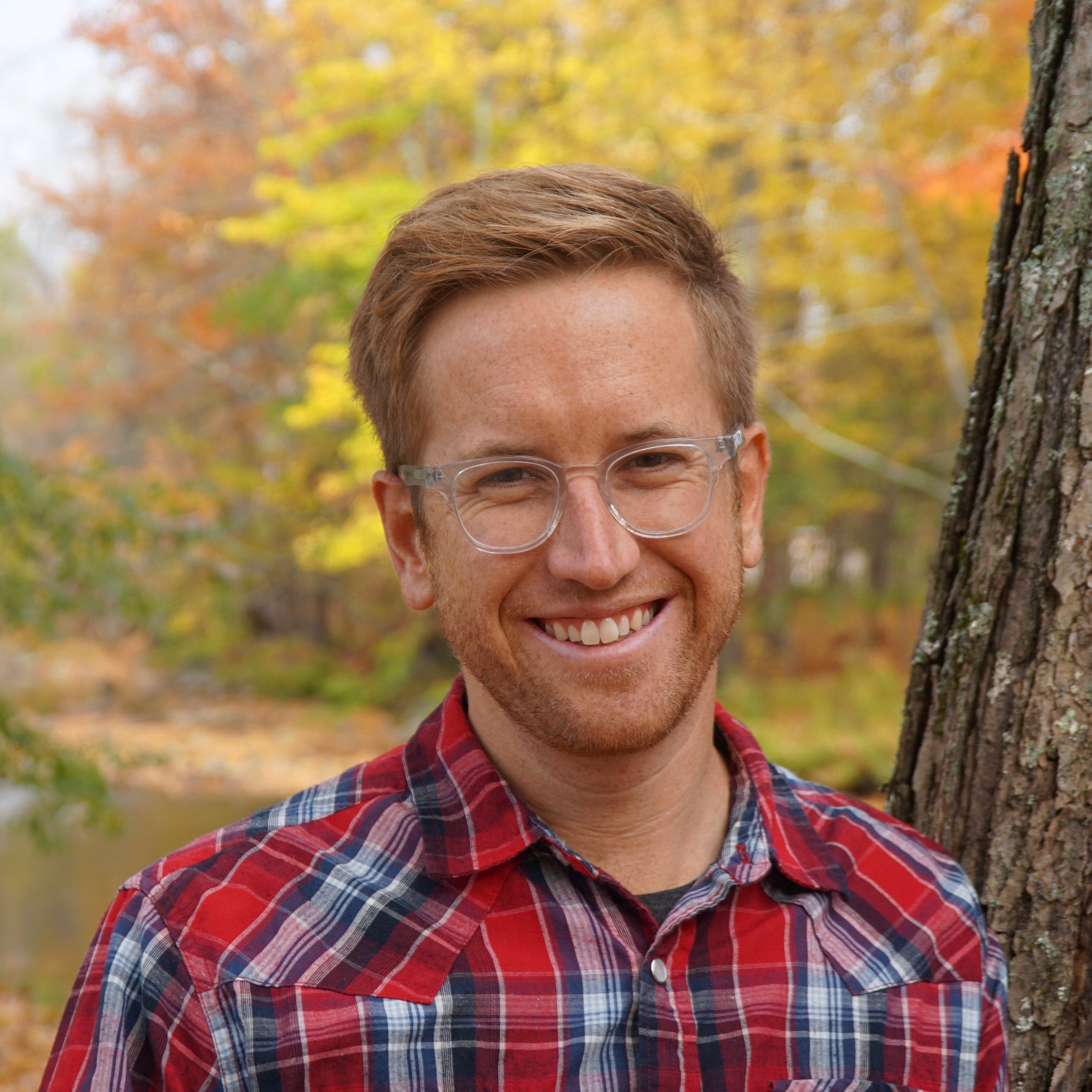
- Education: Middlebury College

Jamie Henn is a climate activist and founder and director of Fossil Free Media, a nonprofit media lab that supports the movement to end fossil fuels. Fossil Free Media is the home of Clean Creatives, a campaign pressuring public relations and advertising companies to quit working with fossil fuel companies. Henn is the co-founder and former Strategic Communications Director of 350.org, the international climate campaign.

== See also ==
- Greenwashing
