= Pickens Plan =

Energy policy proposal

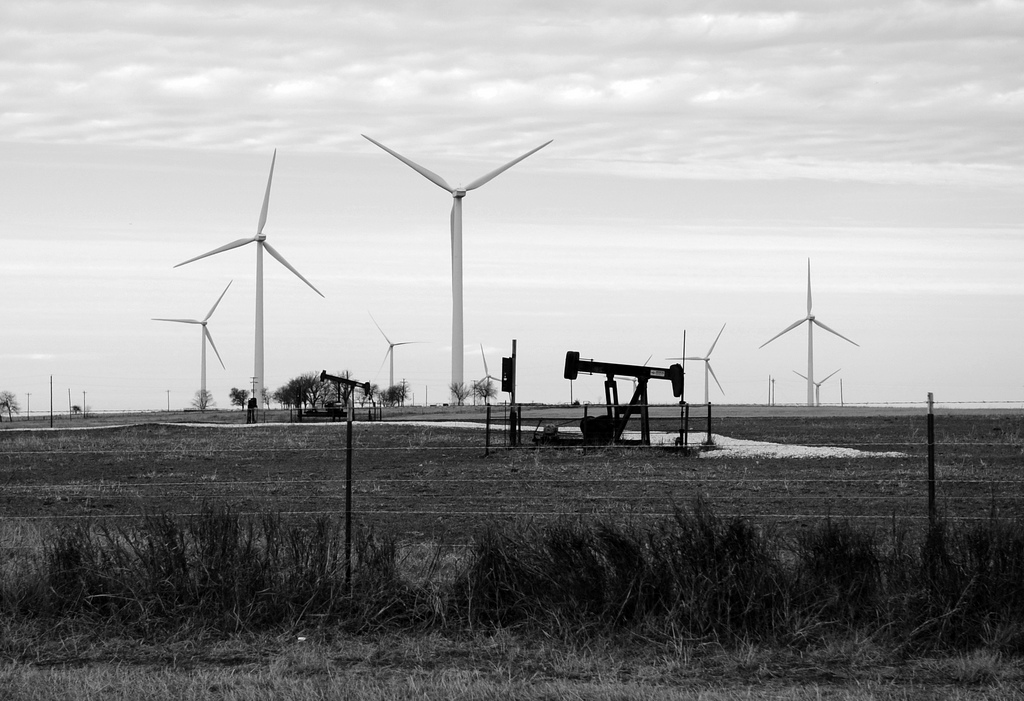
Wind turbines generate electricity behind a pumpjack in Muenster, Texas. This could be a common scene in the Great Plains if Pickens Plan is adopted.

The Pickens Plan is an energy policy proposal announced July 8, 2008, by American businessman T. Boone Pickens. Pickens wanted to reduce American dependence on imported oil by investing approximately $US1 trillion in new wind turbine farms for power generation, which he believed would allow the natural gas used for power generation to be shifted to fuel trucks and other heavy vehicles with Compressed natural gas. Pickens stated that his plan could reduce by $300 billion (43%) the amount the country spends annually on foreign oil.

== Proposal ==
The main proposals of the plan are:

1. Private industry would fund and install thousands of wind turbines in the Great Plains, which Pickens refers to as the potential "wind corridor" of the United States due to favorable wind resources and geographic location. Pickens estimates that these turbines could generate enough power to provide 20 percent or more of the country's electricity supply.
2. Government would pay for electric power transmission lines to connect the turbine farms to the power grid. They would provide energy to the Midwest, South and Western regions of the country.
3. With wind energy providing a large portion of the nation's electricity, the natural gas that is currently used to fuel power plants would be used instead as a fuel for thousands of vehicles. To increase efficiency, the Plan puts an emphasis on natural gas-burning fleets of trucks and buses. Thus, the demand for petroleum products made from imported oil would be reduced.

=== Timetable ===
Pickens thought his plan that would provide 22% of electricity from wind power and the conversion for vehicles from gasoline to gas could be accomplished in less than 10 years with the right leadership. However, according to Chuck McGowin, senior project manager at the Electric Power Research Institute, a nonprofit organization funded by the electric power industry, the timetable was too tight. Dave Hamilton, director for global warming and energy projects at the Sierra Club agreed: "That is extremely aggressive .. But it's in the right direction. It's a good thing we have an oilman saying we can't drill our way out of this problem." Former U.S. vice president Al Gore, who had spent recent years informing people about global warming, opined that all electricity generation should be completely fossil-fuel free in the next 10 years.

=== Wind power status and potential ===
Wind power had been experiencing exponential growth in the United States for several years when Pickens announced his plan. Wind power in Texas grew very rapidly, 2400% from 1999 to 2007. In another large state, California, wind generation increased by 48% in the same period. The cost of wind power generation has decreased by about 80% over the last 20 years because of technological advances and is now cost-competitive with other energy sources. Wind-generated electricity can be produced at 5 to 6 cents per kWh.

A yardstick used to determine locations with high potential wind energy production is referred to as Wind Power Density (WPD). It is a calculation relating to the effective force of the wind at a particular location, frequently expressed in terms of the elevation above ground level over a period of time. It takes into account wind velocity and mass. Color coded maps are frequently prepared for a particular area described, for example, as "Mean Annual Power Density at 50 Meters." The results of the above calculation are entered into an index developed by the National Renewable Energy Laboratory and referred to as "NREL CLASS." The larger the WPD calculation, the higher it is rated by class.

The Pickens Plan called for increasing the installed wind power capacity by at least a factor of ten from its 2008 level by 2018. This would tap only a small fraction of total U.S. wind power potential, which is estimated to be as much as 16 times more than the year-2005 electricity demand in the United States.

Installed U.S. wind power
Year	Nameplate Capacity, MW
1999	2,500
2000	2,566
2001	4,261
2002	4,685
2003	6,374
2004	6,740
2005	9,149
2006	11,575
2007	16,596
2008	25,176

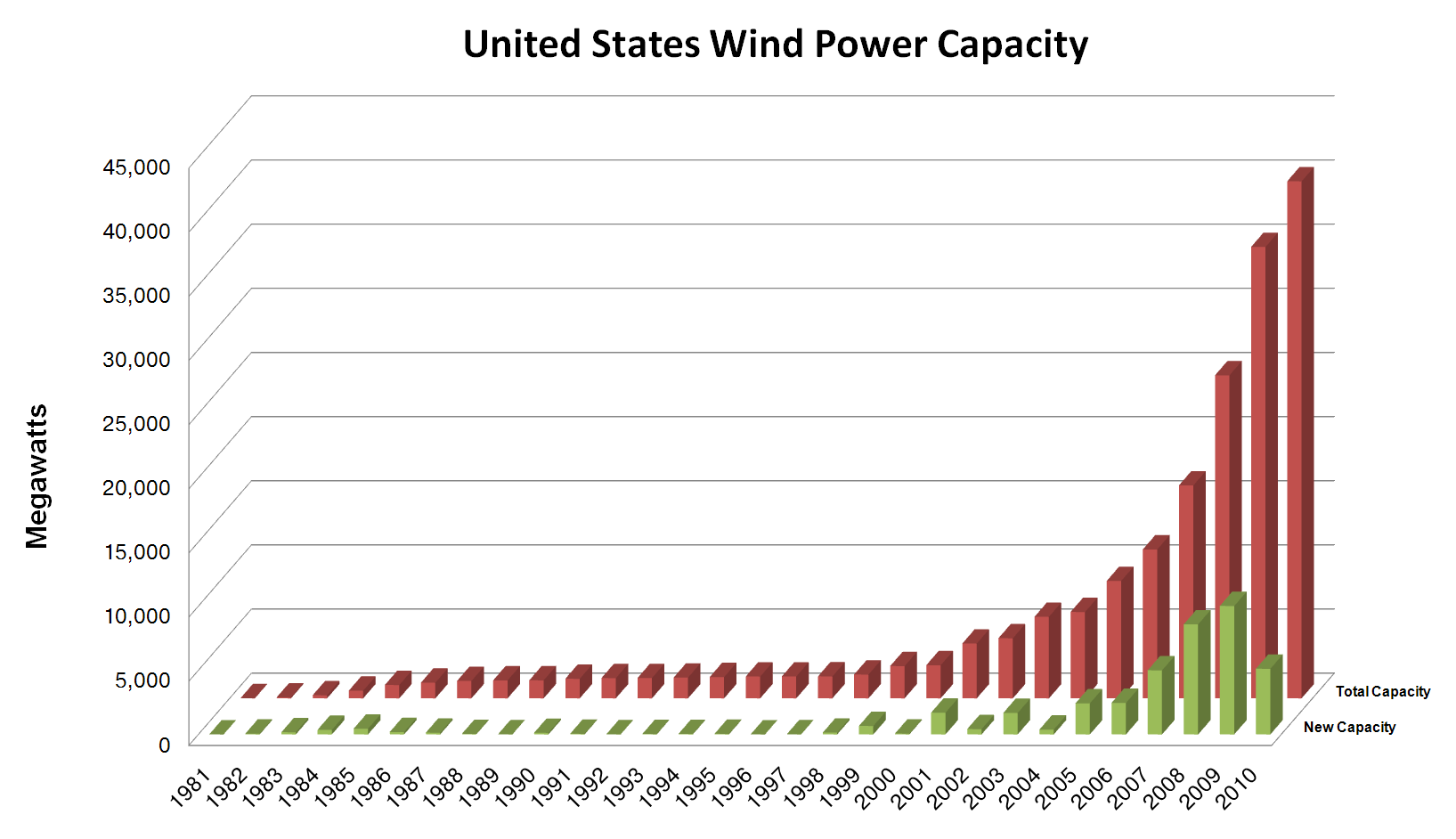
A bar graph displaying US installed wind power from 1981 to 2010

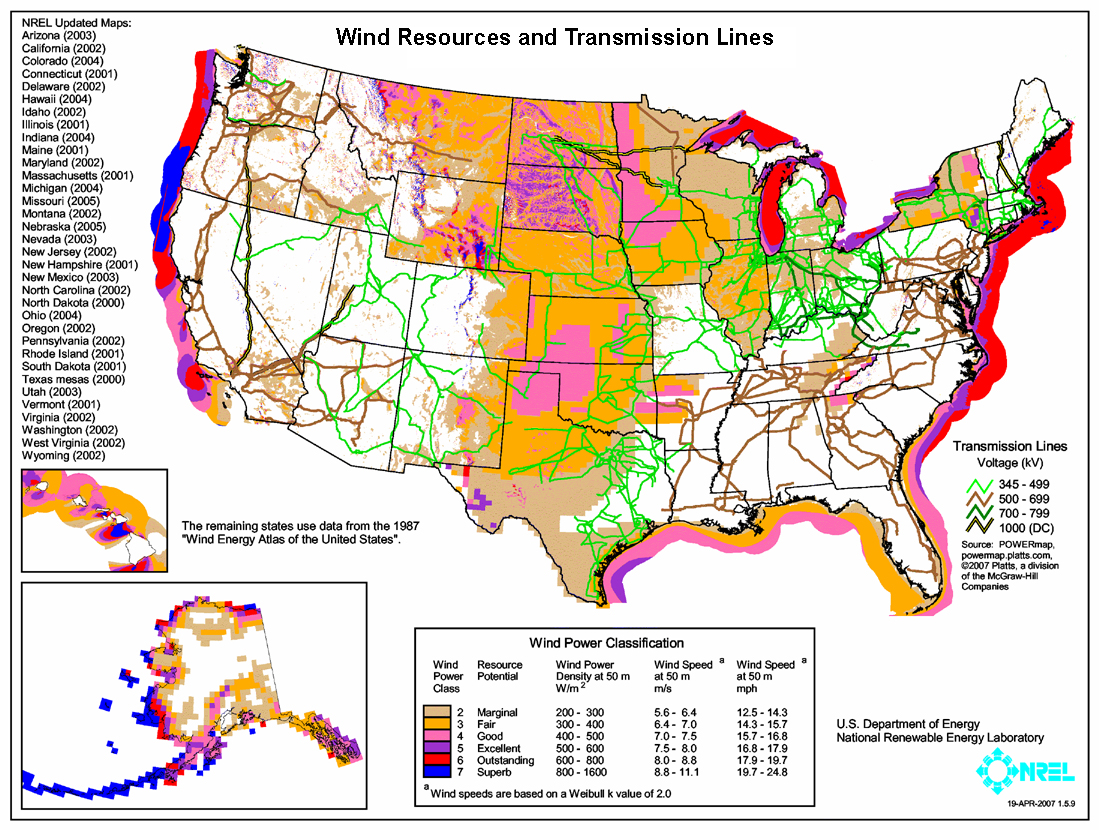
Map of available wind power for the United States at 50m. Color codes indicate wind power density class. Note the shortage of transmission lines through much of the Great Plains wind corridor.

== Technical issues ==
=== Power generation and transmission lines ===
High voltage transmission lines

Pickens says that his plan could generate enough wind power to provide 22 percent of the country's electricity. The Institute for Energy Research (IER), an organization that is funded by the oil industry, disagrees. The IER claims that Pickens' plan relies on government subsidies and that producing large amounts of wind power is not a viable option. Instead, the IER advocates "less government for more abundant and affordable energy."

Pickens acknowledges that natural gas would still be required for peak electricity demand and additional infrastructure would be needed to distribute the wind energy across the country. New transmission lines, worth $64 billion to $128 billion, would be needed to carry the power from the wind turbines to the cities. Pickens testified before the Senate Homeland Security and Government Affairs Committee and said the government should begin building transmission lines for wind-generated power in the same way that President Eisenhower did by declaring an emergency to build the interstate highway system in the 1950s and 1960s. As an alternative, Pickens proposed that the government should provide the right of way on private land and extend tax credits so the private sector can build the lines. Kenneth Medlock III, an energy fellow at the James A. Baker III Institute for Public Policy and a critic of Pickens' Plan, said "A lot of what he's trying to do is add value to a stranded asset."

Despite the recession, Denver oil man Philip Anschutz is moving forward with the construction of a wind farm in southern Wyoming and a 900-mile (1,400 km) transmission line to Phoenix, Las Vegas and Southern California.

=== Intermittency ===
One of the challenges with using wind to replace natural gas is the intermittent nature of wind energy, since the same wind conditions are not always present. According to a 2007 study by Archer & Jacobson published in the Journal of Applied Meteorology and Climatology, interconnecting ten or more widely separated wind farms allows 33 to 47% of the total energy produced (15–20% of nominal capacity) to be used as reliable, baseload electric power, as long as minimum criteria are met for wind speed and turbine height.

To dispatch power when the wind isn't blowing, backup power plants would be needed, according to Paul Fremont, an electric utility analyst at the investment bank Jefferies & Co. Natural gas plants can quickly be brought online to supply peaking capacity during periods of low wind or peak demand. According to Art Holland, a director at Pace Global Energy Services, the US will need to replace 140,000 MW of gas plant capacity over the next 10 years due to plant retirements. This translates to twice as much wind capacity due to the difference in capacity factors.

Instead of dispatching additional power generation, energy could be conserved on demand. The Smart power grid, an intelligent power distribution network currently being researched and developed, can reduce power consumption at the client side during peak hours and thereby lessen our dependence on gas for load following.

Storing electricity is currently significantly more expensive than using dispatchable generation, but it can be done. Wind energy can be stored by pumping water uphill when the wind is blowing, and then releasing it through turbine generators when the electricity is needed. TVA's Raccoon Mountain Pumped-Storage Plant near Chattanooga, TN is just one example of many such installations that already exist in the US. Another option is to uprate the peak generating capacity of existing hydroelectric dams by adding more generator units; this allows a hydroelectric plant to buffer the variable output of wind farms on the grid, by accumulating river water during periods of strong winds, and releasing extra water when winds are calm and power demand is high. A dam that impounds a large reservoir can store and release large amounts of water by adjusting the reservoir level within a few meters.

Compressed-air energy storage is another energy storage mechanism. When there is excess electrical energy production, air is compressed and stored in a limestone cavern. Then when the energy is needed again, the compressed air generates electricity by blowing through a turbine. Vanadium redox batteries are being used to store energy and level loads from wind generation projects. The excess energy is stored chemically in different ionic forms of vanadium in a dilute sulfuric acid electrolyte. The reaction can be reversed, which allows the battery to be charged, discharged and recharged.

=== Making the transition ===
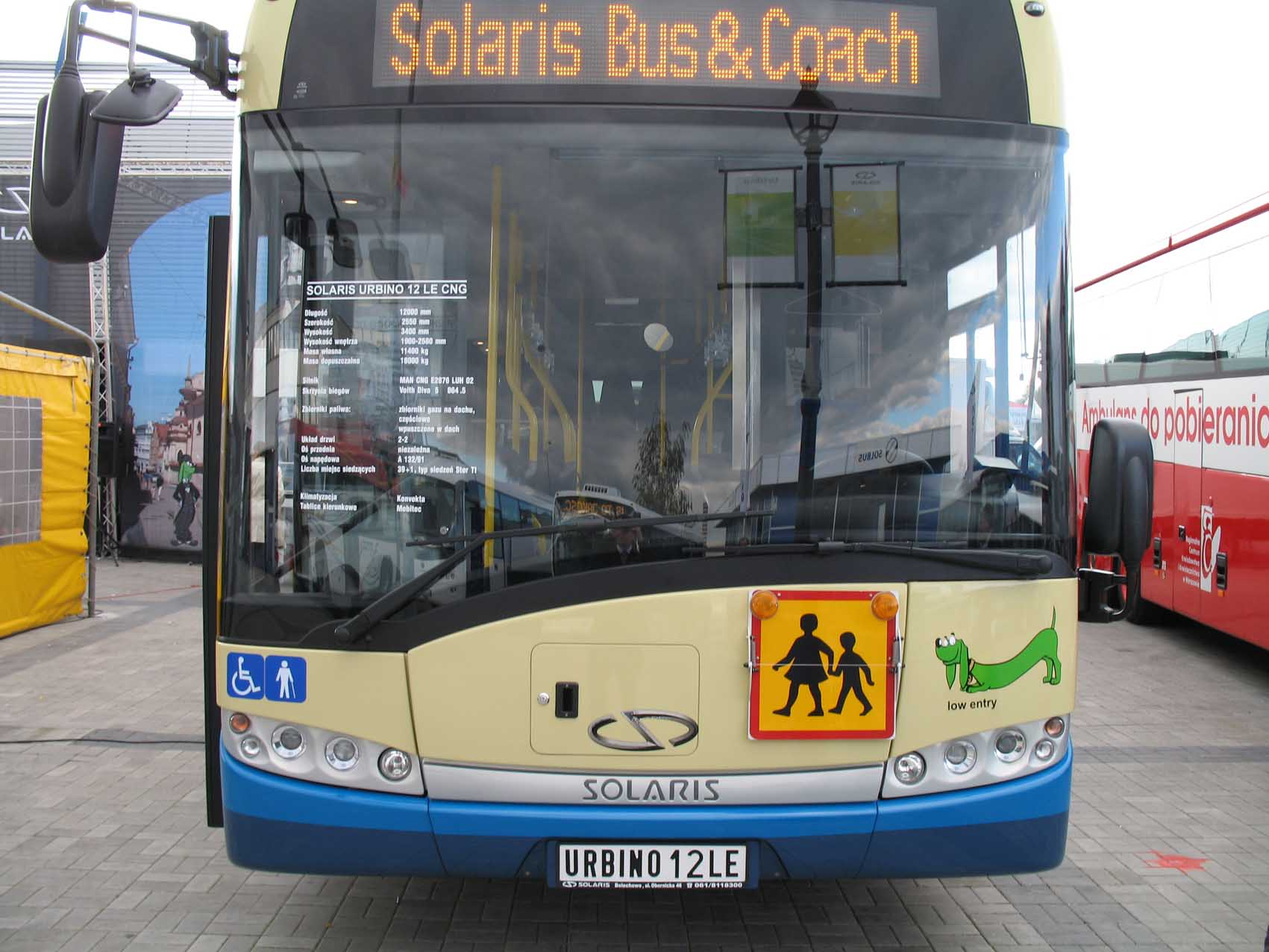
CNG Powered Bus

Pickens' Plan proposes that the natural gas that is currently used to fuel power plants be used instead as a fuel for class 7 and 8 semis. Ken Medlock, a research fellow at the Baker Institute for Public Policy at Rice University, says that the US will continue to use natural gas for electric power generation. Natural gas burns cleaner than coal, making it an increasingly popular fuel for power plants. Gas plants also produce fewer greenhouse gas emissions.

The technology needed for Compressed Natural Gas (CNG) vehicles such as City buses, fork lifts and passenger cars with CNG drivetrains is available now. Honda sells the Civic GX, with a 170-mile (270 km) range. In addition, it is possible to convert vehicles to run on CNG in addition to leaving the conventional fuel injection intact, allowing the driver to switch back and forth at will. Kits are available for the do-it-yourselfer. One can buy a CNG compressor called Phill that hooks up to the city natural gas line making it possible to refuel a CNG car at home.

On the other hand, the IER believes that natural gas vehicles are "a niche product." Patricia Monahan, believes "It's going to be a big price tag" to switch to CNG vehicles. Monahan considers CNG an excellent fuel for running small fleets of vehicles which log heavy mileage per vehicle, such as buses and garbage trucks. Vehicles which use large amounts of fuel realize savings more quickly from the lower price of CNG relative to diesel.

In November 2008, Pickens changed his position stating that he wants heavy trucks, not cars running on natural gas. Rich Kolodziej, President of NGVAmerica, says the very limited distribution network for natural gas is currently available in only 1,200 out of 190,000 gas stations would better serve commercial fleets and long-haul trucks.

== Policy issues ==
=== Renewable Portfolio Standards ===
Twenty-four states plus the District of Columbia have Renewable Portfolio Standards in place to set targets for renewable energy in those states. Four more states have set non-binding energy targets.

== Economic issues ==
=== Funding ===
The Energy Policy Act of 2005 created the Clean Renewable Energy Bond (CREB) program, effectively offering interest-free debt to eligible renewable projects. In October 2008, the CREB program was extended to March 6, 2009.

Since July 2008, Pickens’ Dallas-based investment firm, BP Capital, has lost as much as $2 billion as a result of the falling stock market and credit crunch. Pickens may have lost around $300 million of his personal funds.

=== Cost of wind vs. natural gas ===
According to Jerry Taylor, senior fellow at the Cato Institute, using wind to generate most of the nation's electricity would undoubtedly result in higher retail electric rates because wind power is twice as expensive as natural gas-fired generation "and probably more if you take out the subsidies." However, the American Wind Energy Association points out that the cost of wind power has dropped by more than 90% in the last 20 years and expects the cost to continue to decline as the industry matures. In contrast, the cost of natural gas is expected to rise. Moreover, the effects on the environment and public health for natural gas are estimated to cost some 0.5 to 2.0 cents per kWh. Similar costs from wind are marginal.

=== Peak gas ===
US gas production since 1900, source: US EIA

The use of natural gas is a key component to Picken's proposal. There are concerns, however, that gas production has already reached its maximum production rate, a point known as peak gas. US gas production peaked in 1973 at about 24.1 trillion cubic feet, declined until 1985, and has been slowly increasing over the last 23 years. (see figure on left). According to peak theory, the rate of production enters a terminal decline after the peak. Peak gas has already been confirmed by Exxon's CEO Lee Raymond. In 2005, he said to Reuters that "Gas production has peaked in North America." The Reuters article continues to say "While the number of U.S. rigs drilling for natural gas has climbed about 20 percent over the last year and prices are at record highs, producers have been struggling to raise output." John DeCicco, a senior fellow at Environmental Defense, is critical of the plan because it assumes that gas would remain cheap despite growing demand and increasing reliance on imports as evidenced by proposals for LNG terminals.

However, implementing Pickens Plan does not require an increase in the supply of natural gas; it calls for a shift in its use, rather than an increase. Natural gas production has been slightly and consistently increasing in the United States for more than two decades. Proven recoverable U.S. gas reserves have slightly but consistently risen since 1996 and are about the same as in 1976. Estimates of technically recoverable reserves in the United States vary as they are generated by geological inferences, but the U.S. Energy Information Administration 2009 estimate was 1747 trillion cubic feet, enough to provide domestic production at 2005 rates for nearly 80 years.

== Other options ==
=== Nuclear power vs. wind power ===
Pickens' plan will require the construction of large scale wind farms to generate electricity. Critical of the plan, the National Center for Public Policy Research, a self described conservative think tank, asserts that nuclear power plants would be a better alternative than the wind farms. They say that nuclear power is also environmentally sound and creates very little waste, that nuclear power is also far cheaper than wind power, and that to build the wind farms would take many square miles of land.

=== Electricity vs. natural gas for powering vehicles ===
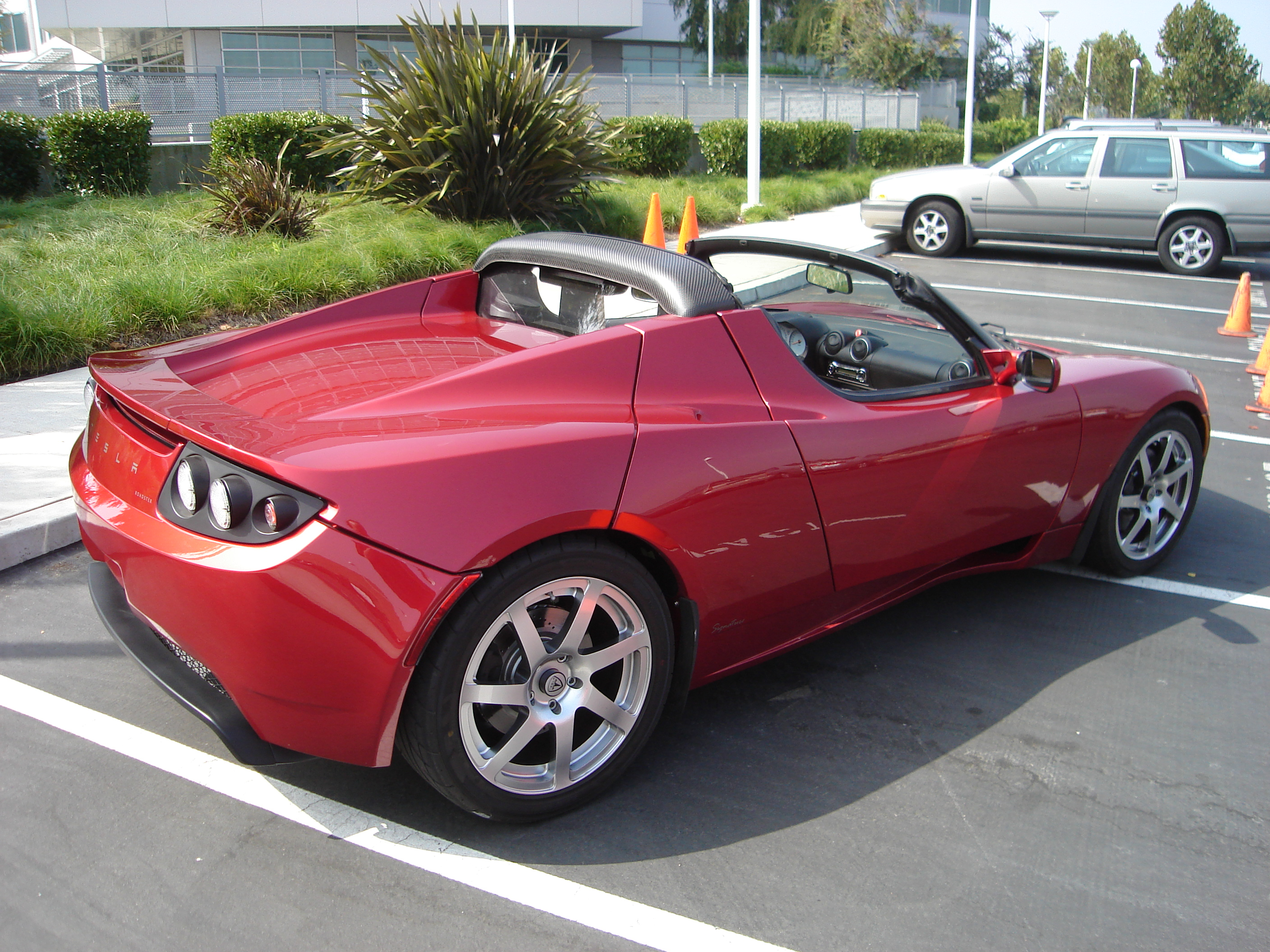
All-electric Tesla Roadster (2008)

To some, this plan seems to ignore one of the most fruitful paths to cut into America's foreign oil addiction: plug-in hybrids and fully electric vehicles. Wind generated electricity could directly fuel America's ever-more electrified transport sector. Some hybrid owners argue the part that using compressed natural gas as a transportation fuel does not make sense especially when the new wave of electric and hybrid-electric vehicles that are expected to hit the market in the coming years. The US government is already promoting the adoption of PHEVs and EVs. The $700 billion bailout bill signed by President Bush in 2008 includes tax credits up to $7,500 for US buyers of electric vehicles and plug-in hybrids.

Pickens does not believe that all electric vehicles are viable, especially trucks. In his plan natural gas primarily replaces diesel fuel. Pickens frequently makes the statement that "the battery won't move an eighteen wheeler" although batteries, electric drivetrain, and engines for heavy vehicles exist in hybrid buses and a hybrid version of the military's HEMTT heavy lift vehicle. The Port of Los Angeles and South Coast Air Quality Management District have demonstrated a short-range heavy-duty electric truck manufactured by Balqon Corporation (http://www.balqon.com) capable of hauling a fully loaded 40-foot (12 m) cargo container. The current design is capable of pulling a 60,000-pound cargo container at speeds up to 40 mph and has a range of between 30 and 60 miles. William Tahil of Meridian International Research acknowledges that hybrid or completely electric long-haul semi-trucks are technically possible, but poses the question if there is enough lithium carbonate production currently to support the production of the needed batteries.

=== Gore's Global Warming vs. Pickens Plan ===
The plans of T. Boone Pickens and Al Gore have some similarities - each lessens the dependence on fossil fuels - but differ in their eventual goals. Pickens specifically wants to see energy security by increasing the use of domestic energy sources including fossil fuels while Gore wants to eliminate the burning of fossil fuels altogether to stop global warming. Pickens claims to have a plan that could accomplish this with existing technology, while Gore advocates new research to reduce costs. A study by the European Renewable Energy Council states that the burning of fossil fuels for energy could be eliminated globally by 2090 using existing technology, and earlier for western nations.

== Dependence on foreign fuels ==
Pickens estimates that his plan would cut oil imports by 38 percent. Patricia Monahan, deputy director of the clean vehicles program at the Union of Concerned Scientists thinks differently. She questions the wisdom of trying to replace large amounts of imported oil with another fossil fuel, especially considering that the United States already has to import 19 percent of the natural gas it uses. The US has been steadily increasing its imports of natural gas since 1985 (see figure to the left), mainly from Canada.

According to Jerry Taylor, senior fellow at the Cato Institute, is that "foreign oil is not bad; it is good." The US is now importing about 70% of its oil needs annually because it is cheaper than other forms of energy. Taylor says that if compressed natural gas is the best option for transportation fuel then "the markets will see it," and over time CNG could outperform gasoline as a cheaper transportation fuel.

== Questions over Pickens' motives and methods ==
Many critics of the Pickens Plan highlight ways that Pickens could potentially benefit personally from the plan. For instance, Pickens owns the water rights to a huge ancient aquifer in the Texas Panhandle and overall owns more water than anyone else in the U.S. Increasing water demands and drought may make cities in the Great Plains willing to purchase water at high prices. Implementing Pickens Plan would give him rights to build electric transmission lines, and by getting a wider right of way it would allow Pickens to build water pipelines.

A similar strategy was attempted in Texas, where Pickens is building a wind farm that will bring electricity to Dallas, Texas. The proposed pipeline would have followed the same 250-mile (400 km) corridor as the electric transmission lines from the wind farms, which was to be seized for utility use from private owners through eminent domain. Many Texas landowners and legislators denounced the plan, particularly the fact that it allowed eminent domain to be exercised by an agency consisting only of T. Boone Pickens's employees. In September 2008, the water pipeline was suspended. T. Boone Pickens continues to purchase water rights in the Great Plains and has plans to build more, smaller wind farms.

T. Boone Pickens could benefit financially if the plan is implemented. His hedge fund, BP Capital, is highly invested in wind and natural gas enterprises. He is the majority stockholder of Clean Energy, the largest supplier of natural gas for vehicles in the United States.

In rebuttal to many critics' opposition, Pickens insists his interest is more in the country's future, than his personal wealth. Possibly as a move against such accusations, Pickens has donated over $700 million to philanthropic causes. In the last few years, he has often been on the Chronicle of Philanthropy's list of top U.S. philanthropists. Still, there are some who are uneasy about a man who made millions in the oil business advocating clean energy:

"When it comes to the Pickens Plan, the burr under my saddle is Pickens himself. I mean, isn't an oil guy selling air and gas a little like Donald Trump pitching poverty? It's downright uncomfortable."

— Jay McDonald

Real concerns over natural gas being used for both home heat and vehicle fuel are that they may create shortages every year in the winter months when demand for home heating natural gas skyrockets. Since many American home owners already use natural gas to heat their homes, a huge increase in demand for natural gas as a vehicle fuel combined with the existing huge home heating demand based on harsh winter temperatures, could drive up natural gas prices ever year. This could be especially economically devastating to family budgets during the holiday months when people normally allocate more of their money for holiday shopping. Having to pay more for vehicle fuel and home heat at the same time (because both would be the same product) could have a major economic impact on the nation every year.

Another concern is that the reasoning behind the big immediate push for a natural gas future, is to lock out possible development and implementation of more viable renewable energy sources. If people can be convinced that natural gas is the best possible future, and a large expenditure can be made now for a massive natural gas infrastructure to use natural gas for vehicle fuel, it will be much more difficult to abandon natural gas as a vehicle fuel and move on to newer, less expensive renewable energy sources as they become more viable to use. If renewable fuel sources are allowed to develop before the country can be convinced to move to natural gas, the window of opportunity to addict the country to natural gas may close, and the people associated with the natural gas industry would lose a lot of money now and in the foreseeable future.

The "Pickens Plan" (which many believe is designed to make Pickens himself much more wealthy) is a "non-profit" organization.

== Support campaign ==
In 2008, Pickens announced that he would spend $58 million on a multi-media effort to promote his proposal, through both old media (such as newspapers and television), and new media (including YouTube, Facebook, MySpace, Twitter, and the creation of a new social network on the Pickens Plan website). As part of this effort, Pickens appeared on many American news programs and talk shows during 2008, such as The NewsHour with Jim Lehrer, Good Morning America, The Tonight Show with Jay Leno, Larry King Live, Fox News and The Daily Show with Jon Stewart. Pickens is aided by his spokesperson Jay Rosser and political ad firm Joe Slade White & Co.

To raise political support, Pickens planned to organize supporters by Congressional districts. He also met with the main party candidates for the 2008 United States Presidential election to discuss his plan. He met with John McCain on August 15, 2008, and with Barack Obama on August 17, 2008.

In October 2008, Pickens announced that the one millionth person had signed up to support his plan, and that two U.S. Senators, 37 U.S. Congressmen and nine governors had pledged "to enact an energy plan that reduces our foreign oil dependence by at least 30% within ten years." A year later, another 600,000 people had signed up to support the plan.

== Major endorsements ==
Carl Pope, executive director of the Sierra Club, has expressed support for the Pickens Plan and stated, “To put it plainly, T. Boone Pickens is out to save America”. Former Clinton White House chief of staff and current president of the Center for American Progress John Podesta supports the plan. Barack Obama has stated he supports many elements of the plan. The American Lung Association endorses the Pickens Plan. Former Republican governor of South Carolina, Mark Sanford supports the Pickens Plan.

== See also ==
- Compressed natural gas
- Electricity generation
- Energy in the United States
- List of energy storage projects
- Nolan County, Texas
- Pampa Wind Project
- Peak gas
- Super grid
- Wind power
- Wind power in Texas
- Wind power in the United States
