= Fossil fuel phase-out =

Gradual reduction of the use and production of fossil fuels

Investment: Companies, governments and households have been investing increasing amounts in decarbonisation, including renewable energy, electric vehicles and associated infrastructure, energy storage, energy-efficient heating systems, carbon capture and storage, and hydrogen energy.

Fossil fuel phase-out is the proposed gradual global reduction of the use and production of fossil fuels to zero, to reduce air pollution, limit climate change, and strengthen energy independence. It is part of the ongoing renewable energy transition.

Many countries are shutting down coal-fired power stations, and some countries are building new ones, such that electrical energy generated by fossil fuel, and coal in particular, is still increasing as of 2024. Hence electricity generation is not moving off coal at all, and so will not meet climate goals. Many countries have set dates to stop selling petrol and diesel cars and trucks, but a timetable to stop burning fossil gas has not yet been agreed.

Current efforts in fossil fuel phase-out involve replacing fossil fuels with sustainable energy sources in sectors such as transport and heating. Alternatives to fossil fuels include electrification, green hydrogen and biofuel. Phase-out policies include both demand-side and supply-side measures. Whereas demand-side approaches seek to reduce fossil-fuel consumption, supply-side initiatives seek to constrain production to accelerate the pace of energy transition and reduction in emissions. It has been suggested that laws should be passed to make fossil fuel companies bury the same amount of carbon as they emit. The International Energy Agency estimates that in order to achieve carbon neutrality by the middle of the century, global investments in renewable energy must triple by 2030, reaching over $4 trillion annually.

As of 2024, global use of fossil fuels is increasing, continuing the trend since 1965, if not earlier.

In April 2026, 57 nations met in Colombia for the first International Conference on Transitioning Away from Fossil Fuels, intentionally excluding the United States and other major oil and gas producers. This diplomatic move follows a U.S. policy shift favoring fossil fuel energy over green initiatives and a lack of firm commitments at recent United Nations Climate Change Conferences.

== Scope ==
While crude oil and natural gas are also being phased out in chemical processes (e.g. production of new building blocks for plastics) as the circular economy and biobased economy (e.g. bioplastics) are being developed to reduce plastic pollution, the fossil fuel phase out specifically aims to end the burning of fossil fuels and the consequent production of greenhouse gases. Therefore, attempts to reduce the use of oil and gas in the plastic industry do not form part of fossil fuel phase-out or reduction plans.

== Types of fossil fuels ==
=== Coal ===
The annual amount of coal plant capacity being retired increased into the mid-2010s. However, the rate of retirement has since stalled, and global coal phase-out is not yet compatible with the goals of the Paris Climate Agreement.

In parallel with retirement of some coal plant capacity, other coal plants are still being added, though the annual amount of added capacity has been declining since the 2010s.

To meet the Paris Agreement target of keeping global warming to well below 2 °C (3.6 °F), coal use needs to halve from 2020 to 2030. However, as of 2017, coal supplied over a quarter of the world's primary energy and about 40% of the greenhouse gas emissions from fossil fuels. Phasing out coal has short-term health and environmental benefits which exceed the costs, and without it the 2 °C target in the Paris Agreement cannot be met; but some countries still favour coal, and there is much disagreement about how quickly it should be phased out.

As of 2018, 30 countries and many sub-national governments and businesses had become members of the Powering Past Coal Alliance, each making a declaration to advance the transition away from unabated (abated means with carbon capture and storage (CCS), but almost all power plants are unabated as CCS is so expensive) coal power generation. As of 2019, however, the countries which use the most coal have not joined, and some countries continue to build and finance new coal-fired power stations. A just transition from coal is supported by the European Bank for Reconstruction and Development.

In 2019 the UN Secretary General said that countries should stop building new coal power plants from 2020 or face 'total disaster'.

In 2020, although China built some plants, globally more coal power was retired than built: the UN Secretary General has said that OECD countries should stop generating electricity from coal by 2030 and the rest of the world by 2040.

=== Oil ===
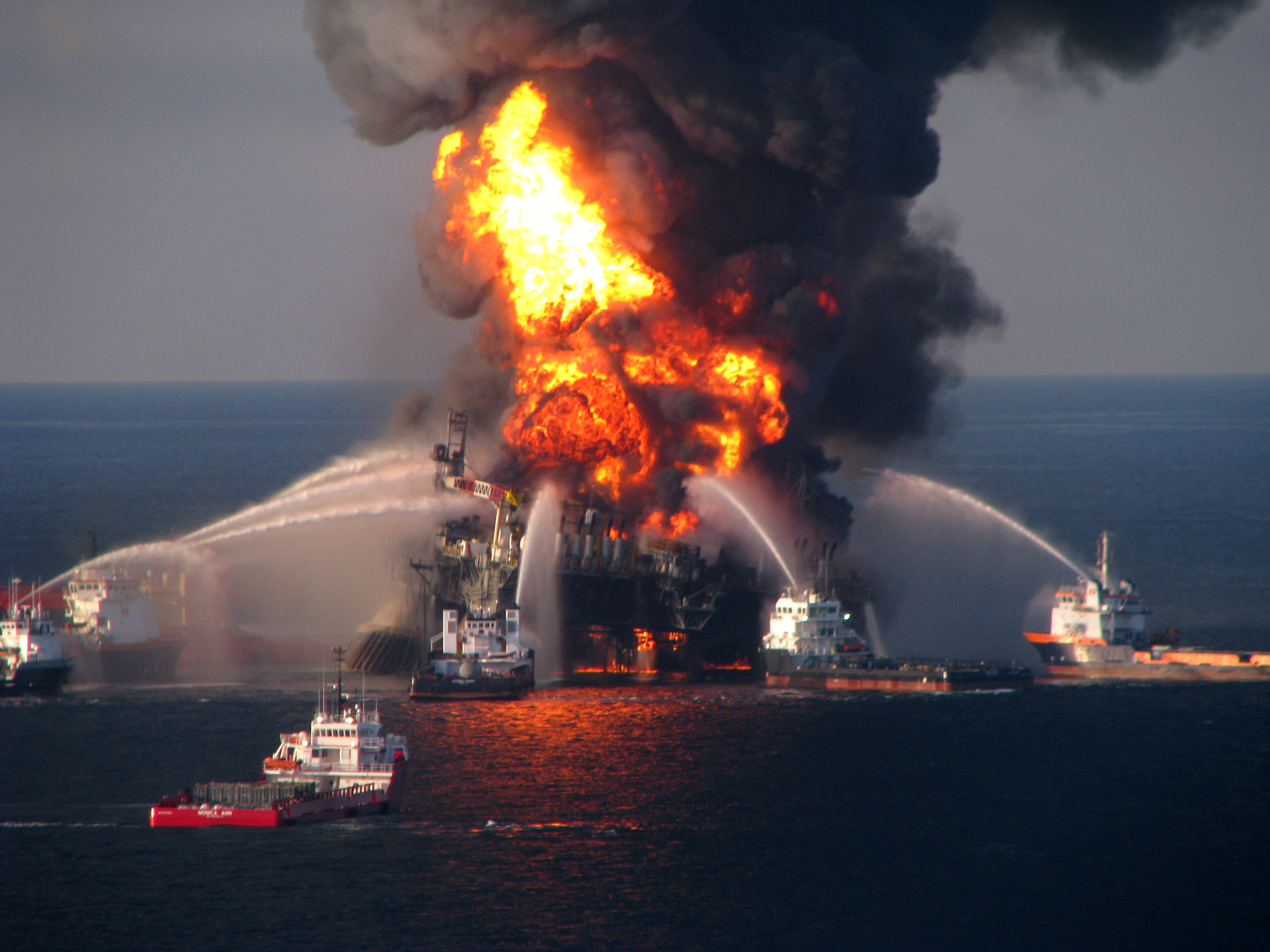
The 2010 Deepwater Horizon oil spill discharges 4.9 million barrels (780,000 m^{3}).

Crude oil is refined into fuel oil, diesel and petrol. The refined products are primarily for transportation by conventional cars, trucks, trains, planes and ships. Popular alternatives are human-powered transport, public transport, electric vehicles, and biofuels. The IISD has suggested a plan for oil and gas phase-out, but OPEC has called it a fantasy.

Oil phase-out is first related to a decrease in oil demand. But oil phase-out is also a question of which deposits to phase out first. Indeed, oil deposits vary in extraction costs and carbon intensity (due to flaring, methane venting, and oil- and reservoir-specific characteristics). For instance, the extraction and refining of oil produced in Venezuela or Canada is about twice as polluting in as the average oil barrel in Saudi Arabia. For any future Net-zero compatible demand pathways, oil phase-out can therefore be done by first phasing out high–carbon-intensity oil, saving gigatons of CO₂ in addition to emission reductions coming from the decrease in oil demand.

=== Natural gas ===
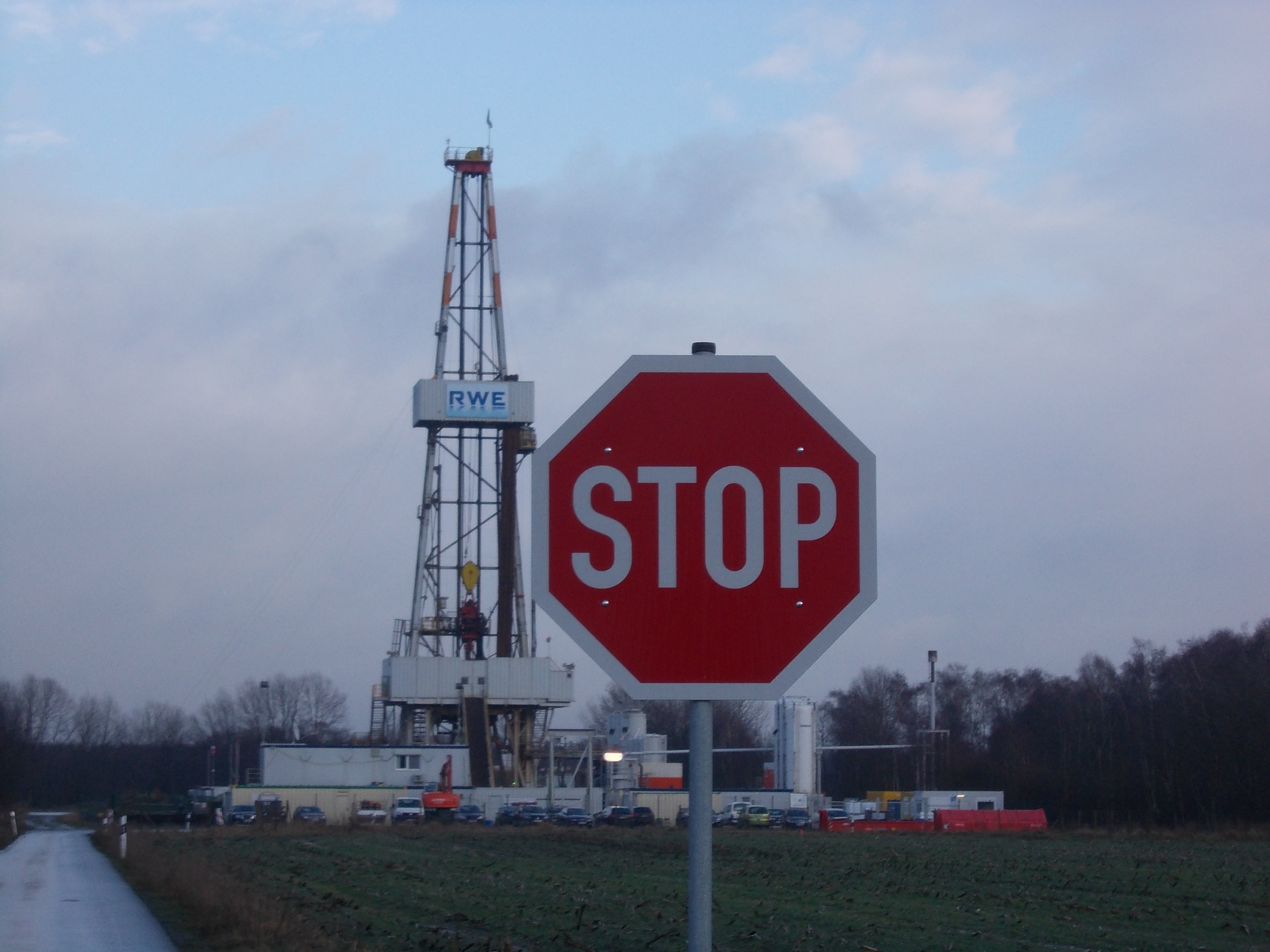
Natural gas well in Germany

Natural gas is widely used to generate electricity and has an emission intensity of about 500 g/kWh. Heating is also a major source of carbon dioxide emissions. Leaks are also a large source of atmospheric methane.

In some countries natural gas is being used as a temporary "bridge fuel" to replace coal, in turn to be replaced by renewable sources or a hydrogen economy. However this "bridge fuel" may significantly extend the use of fossil fuel or strand assets, such as gas-fired power plants built in the 2020s, as the average plant life is 35 years. Although natural gas assets are likely to be stranded later than oil and coal assets, perhaps not until 2050, some investors are concerned by reputational risk.

Fossil gas phase-out has progressed in some regions, for example with increasing use of hydrogen by the European Network of Transmission System Operators for Gas (ENTSOG) and changes to building regulations to reduce the use of gas heating. As residential consumers move to electricity, gas grid operation and maintenance may become harder to fund.

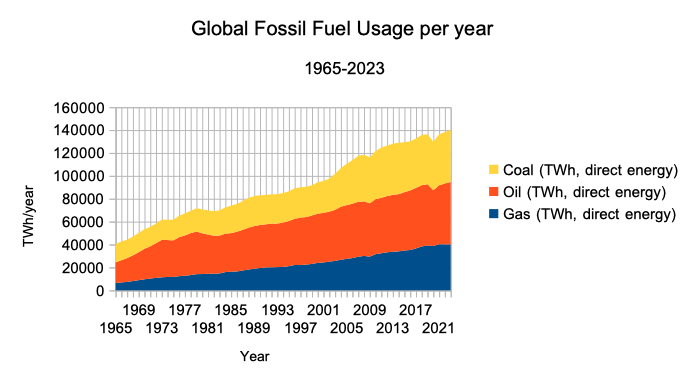
Global Fossil Fuel Energy usage 1965-2023

== Reasons ==
Commonly cited reasons for phasing out fossil fuels are to:

- reduce deaths and illness caused by air pollution
- limit climate change
- reduce fossil fuel subsidies
- strengthen energy independence – countries with low or no fossil fuel deposits often transition away from fossil fuels to gain energy independently

=== Health ===
Most of the millions of premature deaths from air pollution are due to fossil fuels. Pollution may be indoors e.g. from heating and cooking, or outdoors from vehicle exhaust. One estimate is that the proportion is 65% and the number 3.5 million each year. According to Professor Sir Andy Haines at the London School of Hygiene and Tropical Medicine the health benefits of phasing out fossil fuels measured in money (estimated by economists using the value of life for each country) are substantially more than the cost of achieving the 2 °C goal of the Paris Agreement.

=== Climate change mitigation ===
Fossil-fuel phase-out is the largest part of limiting global warming as fossil fuels account for over 70% of greenhouse gas emissions. In 2020, the International Energy Agency said that to meet the goals of the Paris Agreement, the phase-out of fossil fuels would need to "move four times faster". To achieve the goal of limiting global warming to 1.5 °C above pre-industrial levels, the vast majority of fossil fuel reserves owned by countries and companies as of 2021 would have to remain in the ground.

=== Employment ===
The renewable energy transition can create jobs through the construction of new power plants and the manufacturing of the equipment that they need, as was seen in the case of Germany and the wind power industry.

=== Energy independence ===
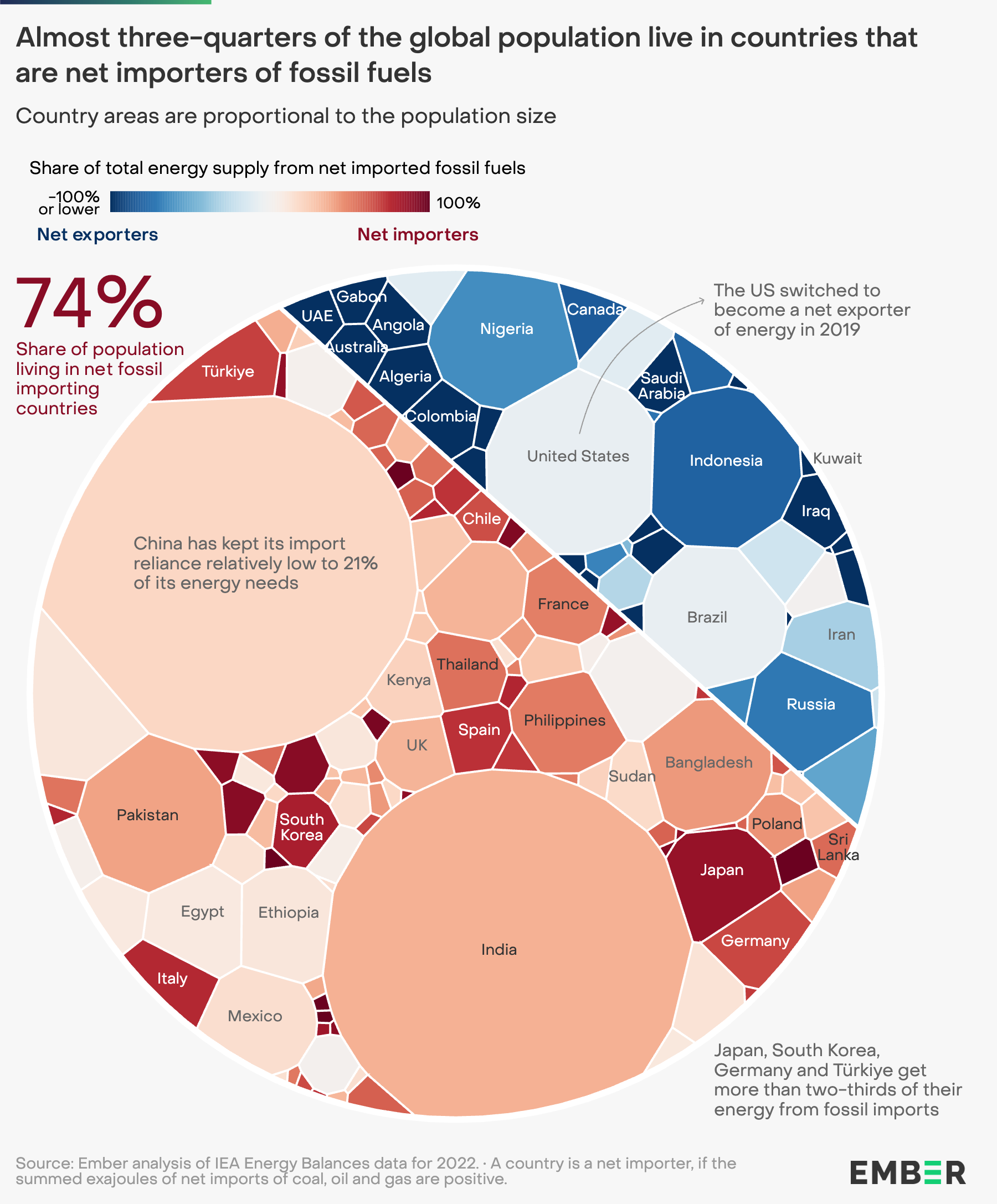
Almost three-quarters of the global population live in countries that are net importers of fossil fuels.

Countries which lack fossil fuel deposits, particularly coal but also petroleum and natural gas, often cite energy independence in their shift away from fossil fuels.

In Switzerland the decision to electrify virtually the entire railway network was taken in light of the two world wars (during which Switzerland was neutral) when coal imports became increasingly difficult. As Switzerland has ample hydropower resources, electric trains (as opposed to those driven by steam locomotives or diesel) could be run on domestic energy resources, reducing the need for coal imports.

The 1973 oil crisis also led to a shift in energy policy in many places to become (more) independent of fossil fuel imports. In France the government announced an ambitious plan to expand nuclear power which by the end of the 1980s had shifted France's electricity sector almost entirely away from coal gas and oil and towards nuclear power.

The trend towards encouraging cycling in the Netherlands and Denmark also coincided with the 1973 oil crisis and aimed in part at reducing the need for oil imports in the transportation sector.

== Phase-out of fossil fuel subsidies ==
Significant fossil fuel subsidies are present in many countries. Fossil fuel subsidies in 2019 for consumption totalled US$320 billion spread over many countries. As of 2019 governments subsidise fossil fuels by about $500 billion per year: however using an unconventional definition of subsidy which includes failing to price greenhouse gas emissions, the International Monetary Fund estimated that fossil fuel subsidies were $5.2 trillion in 2017, which was 6.4% of global GDP. Some fossil fuel companies lobby governments.

Phasing out fossil fuel subsidies is crucial to address the climate crisis. It must however be done carefully to avoid protests and making poor people poorer. In most cases, however, low fossil fuel prices benefit wealthier households more than poorer households. So to help poor and vulnerable people, other measures than fossil fuel subsidies would be more targeted. This could in turn increase public support for subsidy reform.

Economic theory indicates that the optimal policy would be to remove coal mining and burning subsidies and replace them with optimal taxes. Global studies indicate that even without introducing taxes, subsidy and trade barrier removal at a sectoral level would improve efficiency and reduce environmental damage. Removal of these subsidies would substantially reduce greenhouse gas emissions and create jobs in renewable energy. The IMF estimated in 2023 that removal of fossil fuel subsidies would limit global heating to the Paris goal of substantially less than 2 °C.

The actual effects of removing fossil fuel subsidies would depend heavily on the type of subsidy removed and the availability and economics of other energy sources. There is also the issue of carbon leakage, where removal of a subsidy to an energy-intensive industry could lead to a shift in production to another country with less regulation, and thus to a net increase in global emissions.

In developed countries, energy costs are low and heavily subsidised, whereas in developing countries, the poor pay high costs for low-quality services.

In 2009, studies have put forward a plan to power 100% of the world's energy with wind, hydroelectric, and solar power by the year 2030. It recommends transfer of energy subsidies from fossil fuel to renewable, and a price on carbon reflecting its cost for flood, cyclone, hurricane, drought, and related extreme weather expenses.

Excluding subsidies, the levelised cost of electricity from new large-scale solar power in India and China has been below existing coal-fired power stations since 2021.

A study by Rice University Center for Energy Studies suggested the following steps for countries:

1. Countries should commit to a specific time frame for a full phaseout of implicit and explicit fossil fuel subsidies.
2. Clarify the language on subsidy reform to remove ambiguous terminology.
3. Seek formal legislation in affected countries that codifies reform pathways and reduces opportunities for backsliding.
4. Publish transparent formulas for market-linked pricing, and adhere to a regular schedule for price adjustments.
5. Phase-in full reforms in a sequence of gradual steps. Increasing prices gradually but on a defined schedule signals intent to consumers while allowing time to invest in energy efficiency to partially offset the increases.
6. Aspire to account for externalities over time by imposing a fee or tax on fossil energy products and services, and eliminating preferences for fossil fuels that remain embedded in the tax code.
7. Use direct cash transfers to maintain benefits for poor segments of society rather than preserving subsidised prices for vulnerable socioeconomic groups.
8. Launch a comprehensive public communications campaign.
9. Any remaining fossil fuel subsidies should be clearly budgeted at full international prices and paid for by the national treasury.
10. Document price and emissions changes with reporting requirements.

== Phasing-out specific processes ==
=== Phase-out of fossil fuel power plants ===
By 2025, investment in the energy transition had grown to about twice that for fossil fuels (oil, natural gas and coal).

As a source of electric power in the EU, renewables overtook fossil fuels by 2020, and solar and wind together exceeded fossil fuels by 2025.

Energy efficiency is complementary to the use of sustainable energy sources, when phasing-out fossil fuels.

=== Phase-out of fossil fuel vehicles ===
Sales of electric vehicles (EVs) indicate a trend away from gas-powered vehicles that generate greenhouse gases.

Many countries and cities have introduced bans on the sales of new internal combustion engine (ICE) vehicles, requiring all new cars to be electric vehicles or otherwise powered by clean, non-emitting sources. Such bans include the United Kingdom by 2035 and Norway by 2025. Many transit authorities are working to purchase only electric buses while also restricting use of ICE vehicles in the city center to limit air pollution. Many US states have a zero-emissions vehicle mandate, incrementally requiring a certain per cent of cars sold to be electric. The German term Verkehrswende ("traffic transition" analogous to Energiewende, energetic transition) calls for a shift from combustion powered road transport to bicycles, walking and rail transport and the replacement of remaining road vehicles with electric traction.

Biofuels, in the form of liquid fuels derived from plant materials, are entering the market. However, many of the biofuels that are currently being supplied have been criticised for their adverse impacts on the natural environment, food security, and land use.

=== Oil fuel phase-out ===
The standard Hubbert curve, plotting crude oil production of a region over time

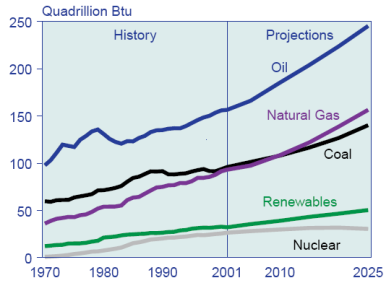
World energy consumption, 1970–2025. Source: International Energy Outlook 2004.

The mitigation of peak oil is the attempt to delay the date and minimize the social and economic effects of peak oil by reducing the consumption of and reliance on petroleum. By reducing petroleum consumption, mitigation efforts seek to favorably change the shape of the Hubbert curve, which is the graph of real oil production over time predicted by Hubbert peak theory. The peak of this curve is known as peak oil, and by changing the shape of the curve, the timing of the peak in oil production is affected. An analysis by the author of the Hirsch report showed that while the shape of the oil production curve can be affected by mitigation efforts, mitigation efforts are also affected by the shape of Hubbert curve.

For the most part, mitigation involves fuel conservation, and the use of alternative and renewable energy sources. The development of unconventional oil resources can extend the supply of petroleum, but does not reduce consumption.

Historically, world oil consumption data show that mitigation efforts during the 1973 and 1979 oil shocks lowered oil consumption, while general recessions since the 1970s have had no effect on curbing the oil consumption until 2007. In the United States, oil consumption declines in reaction to high prices.

Key questions for mitigation are the viability of methods, the roles of government and private sector and how early these solutions are implemented. The responses to such questions and steps taken towards mitigation may determine whether or not the lifestyle of a society can be maintained, and may affect the population capacity of the planet.

Because most oil is consumed for transportation most mitigation discussions revolve around transportation issues.

==== Mobile applications ====
Due to its high energy density and ease of handling, oil has a unique role as a transportation fuel. There are, however, a number of possible alternatives. Among the biofuels the use of bioethanol and biodiesel is already established to some extent in some countries.

The use of hydrogen fuel is another alternative under development in various countries, alongside, hydrogen vehicles though hydrogen is actually an energy storage medium, not a primary energy source, and consequently the use of a non-petroleum source would be required to extract the hydrogen for use. Though hydrogen is currently outperformed in terms of cost and efficiency by battery powered vehicles, there are applications where it would come in useful. Short haul ferries and very cold climates are two examples. Hydrogen fuel cells are about a third as efficient as batteries and double the efficiency of petrol vehicles.

==== Alternative aviation fuel ====
An Airbus A380 flew on alternative fuel for the first time on 1 February 2008. At that stage Boeing also had plans to use alternative fuel on the 747. Because some biofuels such as ethanol contains less energy, more "tankstops" might be necessary for such planes.

The US Air Force is currently in the process of certifying its entire fleet to run on a 50/50 blend of synthetic fuel derived from the Fischer–Tropsch process and JP-8 jet fuel.

== Studies ==
Reduction in fossil fuel capacity compared to renewables

Renewable energy sources, especially solar photovoltaic and wind power, are providing an increasing share of power capacity.

In 2023, electricity generation from wind and solar sources was projected to exceed 30% by 2030, as fossil fuels' use continues to decline.

The countries most reliant on fossil fuels for electricity vary widely on how great a percentage of that electricity is generated from renewables, leaving wide variation in renewables' growth potential.

In 2015, Greenpeace and Climate Action Network Europe released a report highlighting the need for an active phase-out of coal-fired generation across Europe. Their analysis derived from a database of 280 coal plants and included emissions data from official EU registries.

A 2016 report by Oil Change International, concludes that the carbon emissions embedded in the coal, oil, and gas in currently working mines and fields, assuming that these run to the end of their working lifetimes, will take the world to just beyond the 2 °C limit contained in the 2015 Paris Agreement and even further from the 1.5 °C goal. The report observes that "one of the most powerful climate policy levers is also the simplest: stop digging for more fossil fuels".

In 2016, the Overseas Development Institute (ODI) and 11 other NGOs released a report on the impact of building new coal-fired power plants in countries where a significant proportion of the population lacks access to electricity. The report concludes that, on the whole, building coal-fired power plants does little to help the poor and may make them poorer. Moreover, wind and solar generation are beginning to challenge coal on cost.

A 2018 study in Nature Energy, suggests that 10 countries in Europe could completely phase out coal-fired electricity generation with their current infrastructure, whilst the United States and Russia could phase out at least 30%.

In 2020, the Fossil Fuel Cuts Database provided the first global account of supply-side initiatives to constrain fossil fuel production. The latest update of the database recorded 1967 initiatives implemented between 1988 and October 2021 in 110 countries across seven major types of supply-side approaches (Divestment, n=1201; Blockades, n= 374; Litigation, n= 192; Moratoria and Bans, n= 146; Production subsidies removal, n=31; Carbon tax on fossil fuel production, n=16; Emissions Trading Schemes, n= 7).

The GeGaLo index of geopolitical gains and losses assesses how the geopolitical position of 156 countries may change if the world fully transitions to renewable energy resources. Former fossil fuel exporters are expected to lose power, while the positions of former fossil fuel importers and countries rich in renewable energy resources is expected to strengthen.

Multiple decarbonisation plans that get to zero CO_{2} emissions have been presented.

A Guardian investigation showed in 2022, that big fossil fuel firms continue to plan huge investments in new fossil fuel production projects that would drive the climate past internationally agreed temperature limits.

=== Renewable energy potentials ===
In June 2021 Dr Sven Teske and Dr Sarah Niklas from the Institute for Sustainable Futures, University of Technology Sydney found that "existing coal, oil and gas production puts the world on course to overshoot Paris climate targets." In co-operation with the Fossil Fuel Non-Proliferation Treaty Initiative they published a report entitled, Fossil Fuel Exit Strategy: An orderly wind down of coal, oil, and gas to meet the Paris Agreement. It analyses global renewable energy potential, and finds that "every region on Earth can replace fossil fuels with renewable energy to keep warming below 1.5 °C and provide reliable energy access to all."

=== Assessment of extraction prevention responsibilities ===
In September 2021, the first scientific assessment of the minimum amount of fossil fuels that would need to be secured from extraction per region as well as globally, to allow for a 50% probability of limiting global warming by 2050 to 1.5 °C was provided.

== Challenges ==
Net income of the global oil and gas industry reached a record US$4 trillion in 2022. Record income increased shareholder returns and pay down debt; only a fraction of free cash flow was directed towards clean energy investments.

After recovering from the COVID-19 pandemic, energy company profits increased with greater revenues from higher fuel prices resulting from the Russian invasion of Ukraine, falling debt levels, tax write-downs of projects shut down in Russia, and backing off from earlier plans to reduce greenhouse gas emissions. Record profits sparked public calls for windfall taxes.

The phase-out of fossil fuels involves many challenges, and one of them is the reliance that the world currently has on them. In 2014, fossil fuels provided over 80% of the primary energy consumption of the world.

Fossil fuel phase-out may lead to an increment in electricity prices, because of the new investments needed to replace their share in the electricity mix with alternative energy sources.

Another impact of a phase-out of fossil fuels is in employment. In the case of employment in the fossil fuel industry, a phase-out is logically undesired, therefore, people employed in the industry will usually oppose any measures that put their industries under scrutiny. Endre Tvinnereim and Elisabeth Ivarsflaten studied the relationship between employment in the fossil fuel industry with the support to climate change policies. They proposed that one opportunity for displaced drilling employments in the fossil fuel industry could be in the geothermal energy industry. This was suggested as a result of their conclusion: people and companies in the fossil fuel industry will likely oppose measures that endanger their employment, unless they have other stronger alternatives. This can be extrapolated to political interests, that can push against the phase-out of fossil fuels initiative. One example is how the vote of United States Congress members is related to the preeminence of fossil fuel industries in their respective states.

Other challenges include ensuring sustainable recycling, sourcing of the required materials, disruptions of existing power structures, managing variable renewable energy, developing optimal national transition policies, transforming transportation infrastructure and responsibilities of fossil fuel extraction prevention. There is active research and development on such issues.

According to the people present at COP27 in Egypt, Saudi Arabian representatives pushed to block a call for the world to burn less oil. After objections from Saudi Arabia and a few other oil producers, summit's final statement failed to include a call for nations to phase out fossil fuels. In March 2022, at a United Nations meeting with climate scientists, Saudi Arabia, together with Russia, pushed to delete a reference to "human-induced climate change" from an official document, disputing the scientifically established fact that the burning of fossil fuels by humans is the main driver of the climate crisis.

Global carbon dioxide over time by source

Coal production over time

As of 2023, fossil fuels are being used globally in increasing quantities.

== Major initiatives and legislation ==
=== International ===
In April 2026, the first International Conference on Transitioning Away from Fossil Fuels was held in Santa Marta, Colombia. The conference was co-hosted by Colombia and the Netherlands, with 57 countries participating. Participating countries generate about one-third of global economic activity, with almost all participating nations being democracies. Representatives from indigenous groups, civil society, youth, and subnational authorities such as California also participated. The conferences' focus on fossil fuels complements, but does not replace, the work of the United Nations' COP climate change conferences.

=== China ===
China has pledged to become carbon neutral by 2060, which would need a just transition for over 3 million workers in the coal-mining and power industry. It is not yet clear whether China aims to phase-out all fossil fuel use by that date or whether a small proportion will still be in use with the carbon captured and stored. In 2021, coal mining was ordered to run at maximum capacity.

=== European Union ===
The share of electricity coming from renewable sources continues to vary widely among European nations. A few countries generate more electricity from renewables than is consumed in total.

At the end of 2019, the European Union launched its European Green Deal. It included:

- a revision of the Energy Taxation Directive which is looking closely at fossil fuel subsidies and tax exemptions (aviation, shipping)
- a circular economy action plan,
- a review and possible revision (where needed) of the all relevant climate-related policy instruments, including the Emissions Trading System
- a sustainable and smart mobility strategy
- potential carbon tariffs for countries that don't curtail their greenhouse gas pollution at the same rate. The mechanism to achieve this is called the Carbon Border Adjustment Mechanism (CBAM).

It also leans on Horizon Europe, to play a pivotal role in leveraging national public and private investments. Through partnerships with industry and member States, it will support research and innovation on transport technologies, including batteries, clean hydrogen, low-carbon steel making, circular bio-based sectors and the built environment.

The European Investment Bank contributed over €81 billion to help the energy industry between 2017 and 2022, in line with EU energy policy. This comprised nearly €76 billion for initiatives related to power grids, energy efficiency, and renewable energy throughout Europe and other parts of the world.

=== Germany ===
Germany has pledged to become carbon neutral by 2045. Speaking at the COP28 climate summit in Dubai, German Chancellor Olaf Scholz called for a phase-out of fossil fuels, including coal, oil and natural gas, and reiterated Germany's commitment to be climate neutral by 2045, saying: "The technologies are there: wind power, photovoltaics, electric motors, green hydrogen."

=== India ===
India is confident of exceeding Paris COP commitments. In the Paris Agreement, India has committed to an Intended Nationally Determined Contributions target of achieving 40% of its total electricity generation from non-fossil fuel sources by 2030.

=== Japan ===
Japan has pledged to become carbon neutral by 2050.

=== United Kingdom ===
The UK is legally committed to be carbon neutral by 2050, and moving away from the heating of homes by natural gas is likely to be the most difficult part of the country's fossil fuel phase out. Alternative green recovery legislative plans have been proposed by multiple groups to phase out fossil fuels as fast as technology allows.

== Voices of support ==
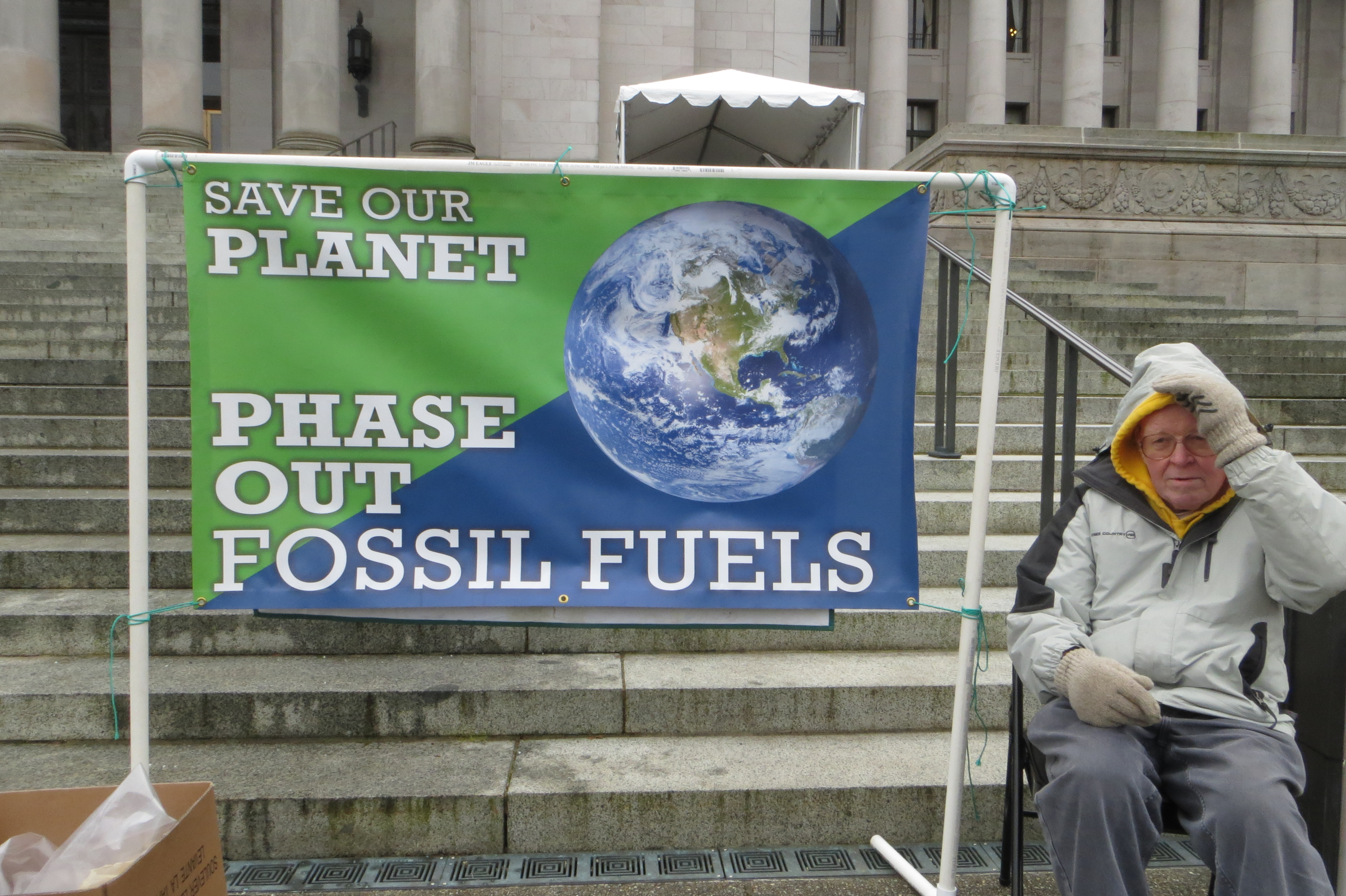
Protest at the Legislative Building in Olympia, Washington. Ted Nation, a long-time environmental activist, beside protest sign.

Prominent individuals supporting a coal moratorium or phase-out:

- US politician Al Gore stated:

If you're a young person looking at the future of this planet and looking at what is being done right now, and not done, I believe we have reached the stage where it is time for civil disobedience to prevent the construction of new coal plants that do not have carbon capture and sequestration.

- Eric Schmidt, then CEO of Google, called for replacing all fossil fuels with renewable sources of energy in twenty years.
- Christiana Figueres, then executive secretary of the United Nations Framework Convention on Climate Change: "Those corporations that continue to invest in new fossil fuel exploration, new fossil fuel exploitation, are really in flagrant breach of their fiduciary duty because the science is abundantly clear that this is something we can no longer do."

== See also ==
- Gas boiler phase out
- Backstop resources – Theory in resource economics
- Carbon bubble – Hypothesized economic bubble involving fossil-fuel energy producers
- Carbon-neutral fuel – Type of fuel which have no net greenhouse gas emissions
- Downshifting (lifestyle) – Adoption of simpler lifestyle
- Eco-economic decoupling – Concept for economic growth without environmental damage
- Financial market impact of the COVID-19 pandemic – pandemic's effect on the fossil fuel industry
- Global strategic petroleum reserves – Crude oil inventories held for national security during an energy crisis
- Health and environmental impact of the coal industry
- Measures taken to address the economic impact of the COVID-19 pandemic
- Making Sweden an Oil-Free Society – a mitigation proposal
- Pickens Plan – Energy policy proposal
- Prospective Outlook on Long-term Energy Systems – Long-term energy-systems model POLES, an energy model
- Renewable energy commercialization – Deployment of technologies harnessing easily replenished natural resources
- Sustainable energy – Energy that responsibly meets social, economic, and environmental needs
- Repurposing offshore drilling rigs for storing carbon – Offshore ocean structure with oil drilling and related facilities
- World energy resources and consumption – Global production and usage of energy
- List of countries by coal production
- List of countries by oil extraction
