= Maria Reyes (climate activist) =

Mexican Environmentalist

- Born: 2002 (age 23–24); Puebla, Mexico
- Citizenship: Mexican
- Occupation: Environmental Activist
- Known for: Climate Activism
- Movement: School Strike for Climate

Maria Reyes (born 2002 in Mexico) is a Mexican ecofeminist and climate activist, involved in Fridays for Future MAPA, International, and the Alliance of Non-Governmental Radical Youth (A.N.G.R.Y). Her activism is centered on a range of critical issues within the climate movement, both environmental justice and the intersectional struggles that tie climate change to social inequalities.

She is on the steering committee of the Fossil Fuel Non-Proliferation Treaty Initiative
