= .eco =

Internet top-level domain

- Introduced: April 25, 2017 (general public)
- TLD type: Generic top-level domain (gTLD)
- Status: Active
- Registry: Big Room Inc.
- Intended use: Environmentalist or environmentally-conscious organisations
- Documents: ICANN Registry Agreement, Policies
- DNSSEC: Yes
- Registry website: go.eco

.eco is a top-level domain (TLD). It was proposed in ICANN's new generic top-level domain (gTLD) program and became available to the general public on April 25, 2017. The registry is advised by a council of organizations.

The .eco domain is unique in that it requires a two-stage activation process. After registering a .eco domain, the domain is registered and placed on a 'hold' status. Registrants are then sent an activation email. This email invites registrants to walk-through a simple process in which they make a public pledge: "We pledge to support positive change for the planet and to be honest when sharing information on environmental actions." Registrants are also required to select a number of sustainable development goals that they want to work towards achieving. The pledge and priorities are amalgamated at one location. This allows any member of the public to identify who is behind a particular .eco domain.

This approach was designed in consultation with environmental organizations to minimize disinformation and other forms abuse arising from the use of the domain. Registrants are encouraged to link from their .eco website to their .eco profiles as a way of fostering further transparency. The registry also reserves the right to suspend and or take-down domains that contravene their pledge.

The .eco domain was highly contested and was one of very few 'community priority domains' selected by ICANN.
