= May Boeve =

American climate movement leader

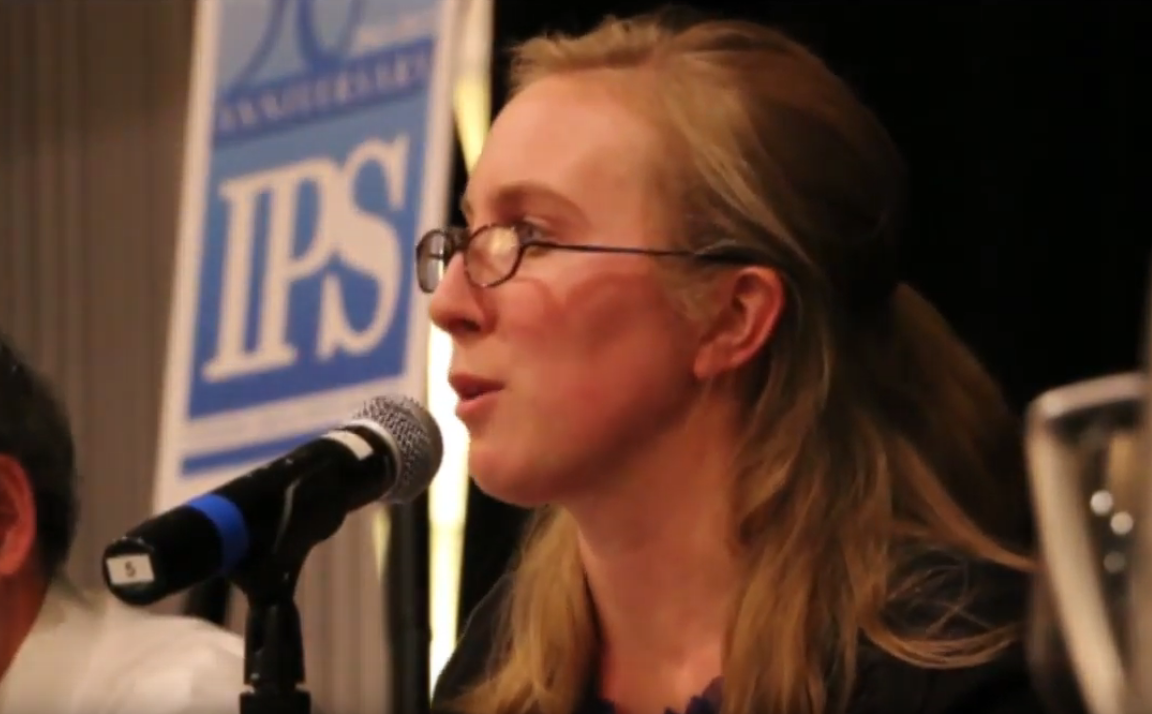
Boeve on a panel for the Institute for Policy Studies in 2013 alongside Ai-Jen Poo, Jamie Raskin, Barbara Ehrenreich, and Robert Greenstein.

May Boeve is an American environmental activist. She is a founder and executive director of 350.org, a climate NGO. The Guardian called her "the new face of the climate change movement."

== Career ==
Boeve attended Middlebury College, where she became involved with environmental and social justice activism. She helped get Middlebury's administration to commit to going carbon-neutral. Boeve then collaborated with Bill McKibben and others to launch the Step It Up initiative, which has hosted thousands of demonstrations and "organized the first open-source, web-based day of action dedicated to stopping climate change." Boeve was a contributor to the 2007 book "Fight Global Warming Now: The Handbook for Taking Action in Your Community," which was published by Holt.

=== 350.org ===
Boeve founded 350.org in 2008 alongside Bill McKibben.

Boeve is among relatively few women leaders of large environmental organizations, and was quoted saying "There's a structural sexism problem, full stop." At 350, Boeve has helped organize climate protests and advocated for fossil fuel divestment and a global Green New Deal. In 2011, Boeve was arrested while protesting the Keystone XL pipeline in front of the White House.

Under Boeve's direction, 350 increased its staff size beyond its budget, leading to reports of turmoil within the organization and 25 people being laid off.

=== Recognition ===
Boeve won a Brower Youth Award in 2006. Boeve was profiled as a "Next Generation Leader" by TIME in 2015. She received a New Frontier Award from the John F. Kennedy Library in 2017 and was a finalist for a Pritzker award from the UCLA Institute of the Environment and Sustainability in 2019.

== Personal life ==
Boeve grew up in Sonoma and resides in the San Francisco Bay Area. She married David Bryson, a consultant, in 2018. Boeve is a direct descendant of William Huntington Russell. She has cited Rebecca Solnit as an influence.
