= Stand.earth =

North American environmental organization

- Formation: 2000; 26 years ago (as ForestEthics), changed to Stand.earth in 2016; 10 years ago
- Region served: Canada United States
- Official language: English
- Website: stand.earth

Stand.earth (formerly ForestEthics) is a grassroots environmental organization founded in 2000. The organization protects endangered forests by transforming corporate policy and governmental laws in the United States and Canada. Stand.earth uses public education, advocacy, protest, negotiation and non-violent direct action tactics to achieve its goals.

Stand.earth has offices in Vancouver, British Columbia, in Canada, as well as Bellingham, Washington, and San Francisco, California, in the United States. Todd J. Paglia is the current executive director of the non-profit.

== Mission ==
Stand.earth challenges the fossil fuel industry, protects healthy forests, and reduces global climate emissions.

== Campaigns ==
Stand.earth has campaigned against pipelines and oil trains, protecting forests through consumer campaigns against Starbucks coffee cups, and reducing emissions from the international clothing and shipping industries.

As ForestEthics, Stand.earth is most known for its Victoria's Dirty Secret and Do Not Mail junk mail reduction campaigns of the 2000s. Campaigns of the 2010s include efforts to protect North America's boreal forest, to stop the Alberta tar sands oil development project, to change the paper industry in the United States, and to expose the Sustainable Forestry Initiative as a false greenwashing scheme of the U.S. timber industry. In 2013, ForestEthics' Honor the Sacred Headwaters campaign led by the Tahltan Nation resulted in Shell oil company withdrawing its plans for hydraulic fracturing, or "fracking", to extract coal-bed methane gas at the convergence of three watersheds in the Klappan Valley of northwest British Columbia Another result of the campaign included the British Columbia government declaring the 4,000 square kilometre area permanently off-limits to gas development.

== History ==
ForestEthics was born out of Friends of Clayoquot Sound (FOCS)—a group of residents on Vancouver Island who originally organized themselves in 1979 to block logging company Macmillan Bloedel from clearcutting a local mountain range—which then became a part of Clayoquot Rainforest Coalition in 1994. ForestEthics was officially founded in 2000. The organization has affected the environmental and paper policies of corporations including Staples, Office Depot, Victoria's Secret, Dell, and Williams-Sonoma, Inc. ForestEthics was rebranded as Stand.earth in 2016.

== Controversy ==
In January 2012, when Stand.earth was still known as ForestEthics, Senior Communications Manager Andrew Frank claimed through an affidavit to The Canadian Press that the Prime Minister's Office (PMO) of Canada, under Stephen Harper, had instructed the CEO of funding organization Tides Canada Foundation to remove financial support for ForestEthics or face the "take down" of all of Tides's charitable projects. According to Frank, the PMO representatives referred to ForestEthics as an "enemy of the government of Canada" and "an enemy of the people of Canada." Andrew Frank stated that the threats of the PMO's office were a direct result of ForestEthics' role in protesting the Enbridge Northern Gateway Pipeline.
