= 2020–2023 North American drought =

Severe drought impacting Canada, Mexico and the United States since 2020

2020–23 North American drought

Animation of US drought map 2020–2023

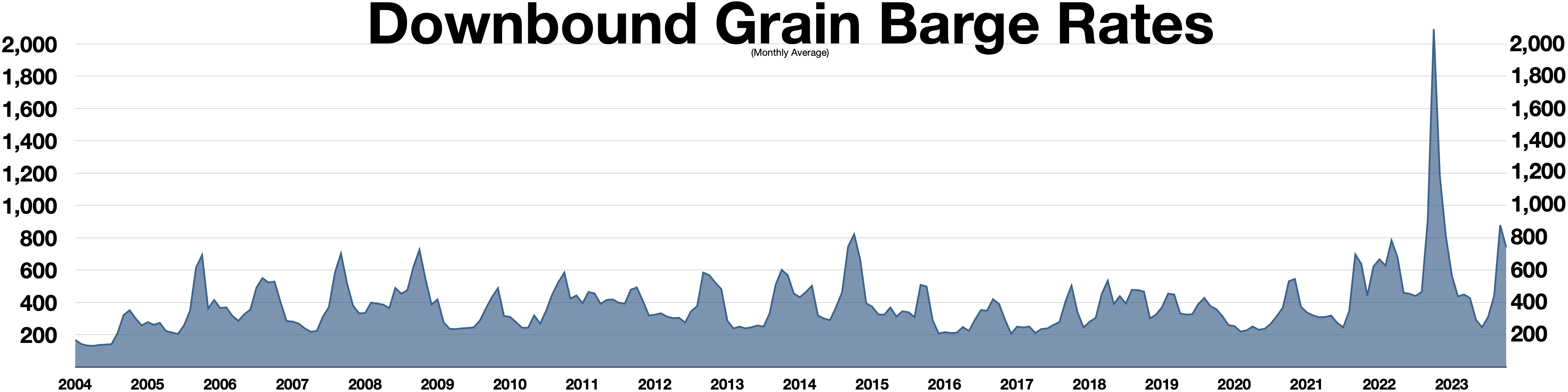
Chart of downbound barge rates. In late 2022 low river levels caused two backups on the Lower Mississippi River that held up over 100 tow boats with 2,000 barge units and caused barge rates to soar.

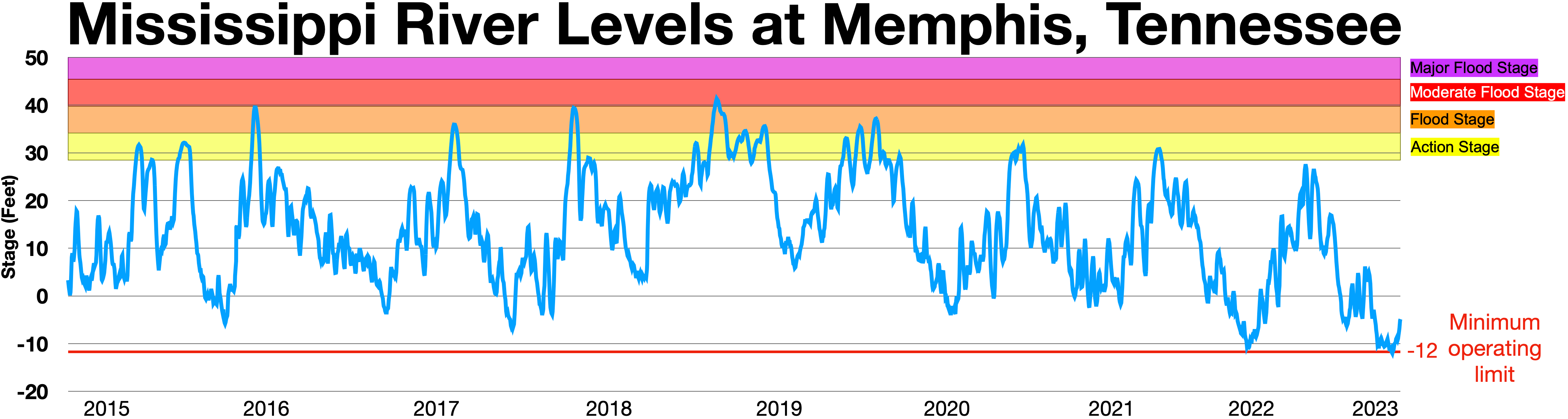
Mississippi River levels at Memphis, Tennessee Major flood stage Moderate flood stage Flood stage Action stage River levels Minimum operating limit (-12 feet)

A drought developed in the Western, Midwestern, and Northeastern United States in the summer of 2020. Similar conditions started in other states in August 2020, including Iowa, Nebraska and certain parts of Wisconsin and Minnesota. At the same time, more than 90% of Utah, Colorado, Nevada and New Mexico were in some level of drought. Also in drought conditions were Wyoming, Oregon and Arizona.

Over the course of 2021, conditions improved in the Northeast but worsened in the Western United States. As of June 2021, "nearly the entire region (97 percent) [was] facing abnormally dry conditions." Drought also affected a wide area of Mexico in 2021, as well as the prairies of Canada.

The drought conditions of 2020 were associated with a moderate La Niña episode that had developed in the Pacific Ocean.

== United States ==
=== West ===
By autumn 2020, the drought in the Western States was the worst since similar drought conditions seven years earlier.

The 2020–2021 drought was described by some as possibly the worst drought in modern history for the Western U.S.

By late spring 2021, dry conditions had expanded to almost the entire state of California and to neighboring Nevada.

In July 2021, after two more extremely dry winters, Lake Powell dropped to its lowest level since 1969 when the reservoir was first filling. Lake Mead fell to a level expected to trigger federally mandated cuts to Arizona and Nevada's water supplies for the first time in history.

The first quarter of 2022 was the driest on record in California and Nevada. Despite June having slightly above average precipitation in California, the state still had its driest first half. This persisted even during the extreme monsoon season, but eased a bit. Since July 28, 2022, Lake Mead rose 1%.

Despite the monsoon, Southern California was put in a drought emergency in December 2022, allowing for water restrictions to be put in place.

==== 2022–2023 California floods ====
The flooding in late December 2022 and early January 2023 alleviated some of the drought conditions by January 3. By March 16, all exceptional and extreme drought was washed out of California. In mid-April, the Governor announced the state would meet 100% of requested water allocations for the first time since 2006. It is estimated that there was more water in the California snowpack in April of 2023 than the total capacity of Lake Mead, the nation's largest reservoir.

=== Midwest ===
In 2020 Iowa received widespread rain in September which improved the dry conditions for the eastern region of the state. but the western half of the state dealt with severe-to-extreme drought problems which extended past 2020 and into 2021. By late April and early May 2021, though, northern, central and northeastern Iowa had fallen back into dry conditions. By mid-August 2021, drought problems in Iowa had worsened; certain areas across the state were affected with extreme drought conditions by August 13. The northwest and east-central regions of Iowa were especially adversely affected with extreme dry conditions by mid-August.

The 2020–2022 droughts were also affecting Michigan, southern Wisconsin, most of North Dakota and northwestern South Dakota.

In northeastern Illinois near the Chicago metropolitan area, May 2021 was the driest since 2012. As of June 1, 2021, Chicago had only received barely half of one inch of rainfall due to drought in the area. April 2021 was one of the city's driest Aprils on record; only .71 inches (18 mm) fell in Chicago in April 2021.

By August 12, 2021, Minnesota was having the worst drought spells since the major drought in the final two years of the late 1980s. Just over seven percent of the state, in particular, nine counties in the northwestern part of Minnesota were having exceptional drought. That was the first time since 1988 the state had been under exceptional dry conditions. The drought conditions in Minnesota during 2021 caused serious comparisons to extremely similar dry conditions eighty-five years prior.

Drought significantly expanded in Minnesota in September 2022, which became the driest on record at the Twin Cities.

=== Northeast ===
By late August/early September 2020, the drought conditions in several regions of the United States had worsened. The New England states were also under severe to extreme drought conditions. 2020 became the driest summer on record in Hartford, Connecticut. The abnormally dry summer across the Northeast led to 99% of Rhode Island being in extreme drought by September.

The Northeastern United States were out of drought conditions by the beginning of June 2021. However, throughout July 2022, drought returned and intensified across the Northeast. Newark, New Jersey had their driest July on record in 2022. Massachusetts was hit particularly hard, as by August 16, over 40% of the state was in extreme drought. Almost all of Rhode Island was in extreme drought in mid-August, after the 3rd driest July on record. August was the driest in New York City since 1994. August became the 6th driest on record at JFK International Airport, 4th driest on record at Islip, New York and 3rd driest on record in Bridgeport, Connecticut. By the end of the month, almost all of New York City, as well as all of Long Island, was in severe drought, with severe drought significantly expanding in the Hudson Valley, and extreme drought being introduced in portions of Connecticut. However, drought improved in September. By September 27, no part of Maine was in severe drought, and most of the state was out of drought. With precipitation increasing in the fall, especially after Hurricane Nicole, less than 10% of the Northeast was in any kind of drought.

In May 2023, drought conditions resurged over the Northeast, especially in places near Harrisburg, Pennsylvania, which saw their driest May on record. By August 24, 47 of Pennsylvania’s counties were out of drought, but 20 counties were still under drought watch.

=== Southeast ===
By June 2021, moderate drought conditions had developed in Virginia, North Carolina, South Carolina and Florida. Drought in North Carolina peaked in early December 2021.

== Mexico ==
As of April 2021, Mexico was facing one of the most widespread droughts in its history, with 85% of the country experiencing drought conditions.

As of April 2022, 30% of Mexico, especially the northern region, still has serious, critical and major drought problems.

Grass fire images

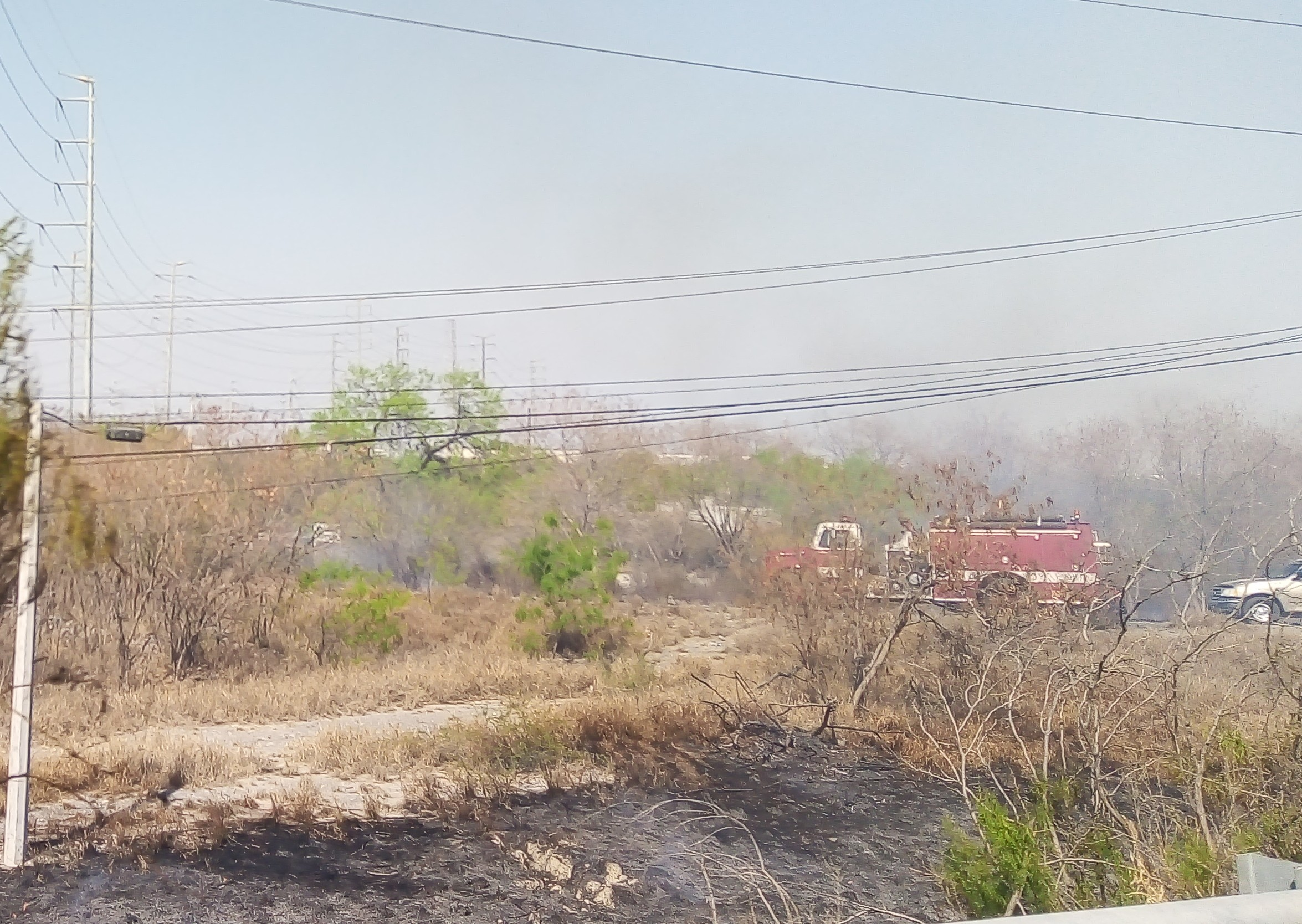
A grass fire being controlled by firefighters in Nuevo León, México, during the drought

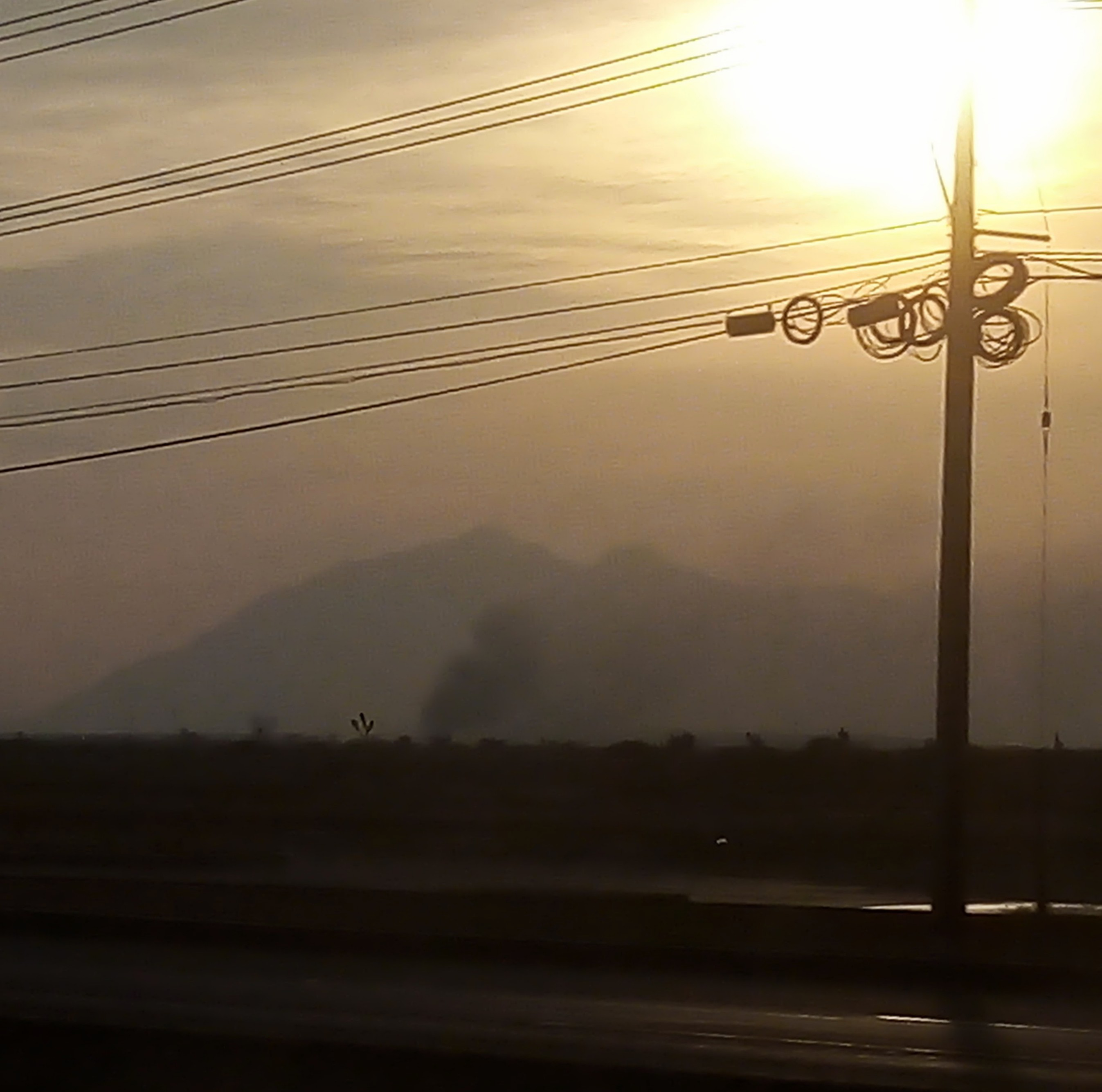
A grassfire in Nuevo León, México, also during the drought

== Canada ==
As of spring 2021, extreme drought threatened the southern corners of Manitoba and Saskatchewan after an abnormally dry fall and winter. In June of 2023, some parts of the Great Plains saw a drought that according to the Canadian Drought Monitor was a one in fifty year occurrence.

== See also ==
- 2021 Western North America heat wave
- 2022 North American heat wave
- 2022 European drought
- 2023 Canadian drought

=== Droughts ===
- Droughts in the United States
- 1934–35 North American drought
- 1936 North American heat wave
- 1983–1985 North American drought
- 1988–1990 North American drought
- Southwestern North American megadrought
- 2002 North American drought
- 2012–2013 North American drought

=== Wildfires ===
- 2020 Western United States wildfire season
- 2021 Arizona wildfires
- 2021 California wildfires
- 2021 British Columbia wildfires
- 2021 Nuevo León wildfires
