= Rainforest Flying Squad =

The Rainforest Flying Squad is an activist movement that sought to protect old growth forests of the Fairy Creek Watershed in British Columbia. The protests began in August 2020 and peaked in the summer of 2021. The group has had complicated relations with the local Indigenous community, the Pacheedaht Nation, but received the support of Elder Bill Jones. The group used a variation of blockades and camps to oppose logging activities by Teal Cedar Products Ltd. Multiple injunctions were obtained by Teal Cedar Products Ltd. to remove protesters from the area. Over 1,100 people were arrested by the RCMP between 1 April 2021 and 26 September 2021, making it the largest case of civil disobedience in Canadian history.

== Background ==
The Rainforest Flying Squad refers to themselves as "a volunteer driven, grassroots, non-violent direct-action movement". They sought to protect productive old-growth forests and encourage Indigenous sovereignty in forestry in British Columbia by protesting against the logging of the Fairy Creek Watershed. They were the main organizers of the blockades and encampments during the 2020-2021 protests in Fairy Creek. The Rainforest Flying Squad is one of many anti-deforestation activist movements across the Americas that have characterized forestry in the 21st century.

Actions began when logging roads were identified in the watershed using satellite imaging. The first blockade was set up on 9 August 2020. Volunteers would stay on site for various periods of time, ranging from a day-long stay to an indefinite stay to block logging activities. It is difficult to assess the exact number of members associated with the movement because of the constant rotation of participants throughout the movement. The Fairy Creek watershed is located within the boundaries of the Tree Farm Licence (TFL) 46 owned by Teal Cedar Products Ltd.

The Rainforest Flying Squad is primarily concerned with productive old-growth forests and the multiple benefits of maintaining and restoring these ecosystems. While some 25% of BC's forests are considered old-growth, 1.5–3.3% of this is considered high-productivity old-growth forests capable of growing large trees. Therefore, about 1% of BC's forests are considered high-productivity old-growth forests. Old-growth forests are vulnerable to climate change and human disturbances; however, they also serve as potential refuge in projected climate scenarios. The Fairy Creek watershed is one of the last remaining unlogged old-growth areas on southern Vancouver Island.

== Indigenous relations ==
The Rainforest Flying Squad was primarily made up of non-Indigenous members, especially when they first started, with many supporters coming in from surrounding urban areas. The movement has been criticized regarding Indigenous consent since it first started. Blockades occurred on the traditional territory of the Pacheedaht Nation. Eventually, Pacheedaht community members, such as Elder Bill Jones, joined the movement and supported the land defenders.

A letter was released by the Pacheedaht hereditary chief Frank Queeso Jones and Chief Councillor Jeff Jones on 12 April 2021, against the blockades and asking land defenders to leave their territory. Elder Bill Jones released a letter in support of the Rainforest Flying Squad the following day on 13 April 2021, which invited people to protect the forest and interact respectfully. Following both letters, the Rainforest Flying Squad released a statement that they would continue the blockades with the support and guidance of the Elder. Elder Bill Jones's support coincided with an increase in Indigenous members on the front lines. Certain camps and blockades would keep ceremonial fires ablaze. One encampment, known as River, was used by Indigenous members to host an Indigenous youth program called "Landback".

== Blockades ==
Six main camps were recognized in the region, five of which were considered as blockades, and all of which were run by the Rainforest Flying Squad. A variety of soft blockades (without people involved) and hard blockades (with people involved) were employed by the Rainforest Flying Squad.

Soft blockades included boulders, abandoned vehicles, and holes filled with materials like rebar, rubber tires, and concrete. These blockades were mainly used as ways to obstruct logging roads.

Hard blockades included people chaining themselves, using tripods, suspending themselves in various ways, and using "Sleeping dragons". People were observed to chain themselves to various objects, such as gates, trees, and each other. People would also position themselves within tripod structures of several meters tall. Members would also engage in "tree sits" which consisted of being suspended or sitting several meters above ground in a tree. A contraption with the makeshift name of the "Flying Dragon" was also used. A defender would sit at the end of a long beam-shaped object, such as a boat's mast, which was balanced delicately by another object, such as an old van. The defender would be dangling off cliffs and other lethal drops. Another contraction known as the "Sleeping dragon" was frequently used by the Rainforest Flying Squad. A person would chain their arm within a pipe-like structure that would then be encased in cement in the logging road.

Some members of the Rainforest Flying Squad would also become "Legal observers". Identified by high visibility vests, they would stand with journalists to observe the protests and blockades to report any mishaps or abuse.

== Injunctions ==
Teal Cedar Products Ltd. was granted an injunction against the blockades by B.C. Supreme Court Justice Frits Verhoeven on 1 April 2021, just short of 8 months since the blockades began. The injunction was granted based on argued economic losses and legal entitlement of the land by Teal Cedar Products Ltd. and set to expire on 26 September 2021. The injunction allowed for the removal and arrest of protesters by the Royal Canadian Mounted Police (RCMP). The RCMP began enforcing the injunction on 17 May 2021. Over 1,100 people were arrested between 1 April 2021 and 26 September 2021, with no clear number on how many of these arrestees were part of the Rainforest Flying Squad. This made it the largest act of civil disobedience in Canadian history.

Teal Cedar Products was denied an extension on the injunction by B.C. Supreme Court Justice Thompson on 28 September 2021. However, the decision was appealed, and an extension was granted on 26 January 2022 by the Court of Appeal for British Columbia's Justices Fenlon, Butler, and DeWitt-Van Oosten until 26 September 2022. An additional extension was granted on 21 September 2022 by Justice Thompson until 26 September 2023.

== Recent developments ==
The group appears to no longer be active, notwithstanding pending court cases, as of late 2023. The Rainforest Flying Squad is currently facing a lawsuit by Teal Cedar Products for 10 million dollars (CAD) over the loss of revenue. No decision has been made as of 6 April 2026.
