= Jeff Jones =

Jeff or Jeffrey Jones may refer to:

== Arts ==
- Jeffrey Catherine Jones (1944–2011), American artist
- Jeffrey Jones (born 1946), American actor
- Jeff Jones (bassist) (born 1953), Canadian musician
- Jeff Jones (hip-hop musician), American musician

== Politics ==
- Jeff Jones (activist) (born 1947), American environmental activist
- Jeff Jones (Welsh politician) (fl. 1996–2004)
- Jeffrey Max Jones (born 1958), Mexican politician
- Jeffery Jones (mayor) (born 1958), mayor of Paterson, New Jersey

== Sports ==
- Jeffrey Jones (footballer) (1886–1976), Llandrindod Wells F.C. and Wales international footballer
- Jeff Jones (cricketer, born 1941), Welsh cricketer who played for England
- Jefferson Jones (cricketer) (born 1954), Barbadian-born English cricketer
- Jeff Jones (pitcher) (born 1956), American baseball player, also coach
- Jeff Jones (outfielder) (born 1957), American baseball player
- Jeff Jones (Guyanese cricketer) (born 1958)
- Jeff Jones (basketball) (born 1960), American basketball coach
- Jeff Jones (American football) (born 1972), American football player
- Jeffrey Jones (racing driver) (born 1982), American racing driver in the 2001 Masters of Formula 3
- Jeff Jones (racing driver) (born 1983), American drifting driver in the Formula Drift

== Other ==
- Jeff Jones (music industry executive) (born c. 1950), American businessman
- Jeffrey P. Jones, director of the George Foster Peabody Awards
- Jeff Jones (executive) (born 1968), American business executive, marketer and advertiser
- Jeffrey Jones, a character on Voyagers!
- Jeff Jones (bicycle designer)

== See also ==
- Geoffrey Jones (disambiguation)
