= Walbran Valley old-growth logging protests =

2025–2026 environmental protests in Canada

- Part of Old-growth forest protests in British Columbia
- Date: August 25, 2025 – present
- Location: Walbran Valley, Vancouver Island, British Columbia, Canada
- Caused by: Opposition to old-growth forest logging
- Goals: Prevention of logging in eight cut blocks
- Methods: Road blockade, tree sitting, civil disobedience
- Status: Ongoing; injunction granted September 12, 2025, extended to January 31, 2028

Parties
Blockaders and supporters	Tsawak-qin Forestry Limited Partnership; Huu-ay-aht First Nations; Western Forest Products

Lead figures
Bill Jones (Pacheedaht Elder); Will O'Connell	Pacheedaht First Nation Chief Arliss Daniels

Number
Approximately 12-24	

Casualties
- Arrested: At least 14 for breaching the injunction; 10 charged with criminal contempt

The Walbran Valley old-growth logging protests, also known as the 2025 Walbran Valley blockade, are an ongoing (as of September 14, 2026) protest against old-growth forest logging on southern Vancouver Island in British Columbia, Canada. Beginning on August 25, 2025, protesters established a camp blocking a logging road to prevent Tsawak-qin Forestry Limited Partnership- a joint venture between Huu-ay-aht First Nations and Western Forest Products- from accessing eight cut blocks of old-growth forest.

On September 12, 2025, British Columbia Supreme Court Justice Amy Francis granted an injunction ordering the blockade removed, paving the way for Royal Canadian Mounted Police (RCMP) enforcement. The order went unenforced for more than two months. The RCMP cleared the camp in operations beginning November 25, 2025, dismantling the cougar sculpture that had blocked the road and allowing logging to resume, and reported eleven arrests by December 9. Criminal contempt charges were approved against ten people in April 2026, and in August 2026 the injunction was extended to January 31, 2028 after several hundred trees in the company's cut blocks were found to have been spiked.

The blockade represents a continuation of old-growth forest conflicts in British Columbia, following the 2020-2021 Fairy Creek old-growth logging protests, which resulted in 1,188 arrests and became the largest act of civil disobedience in Canadian history.

== Background ==
=== Old-growth forest policy in British Columbia ===
In April 2020, a strategic review panel led by Al Gorley and Garry Merkel submitted "A New Future for Old Forests: A Strategic Review of How British Columbia Manages for Old Forests Within its Ancient Ecosystems" to the BC government. The panel concluded that "the priorities that currently drive our forest management system are backwards" and warned that without urgent action, "conditions that exist in many of these forests and ecosystems are simply non-renewable in any reasonable time frame." The review provided 14 interconnected recommendations designed to achieve what the panel termed a necessary "paradigm shift" in forest management, with implementation timelines ranging from 6 to 36 months. The NDP government promised to implement all recommendations, though environmental advocates have argued that implementation has been insufficient and old-growth logging continues in priority areas identified in the report.

On September 11, 2020, Premier John Horgan publicly released the review and committed to implementing all 14 recommendations "in their totality." The most critical recommendation called for immediate deferrals within six months for ecosystems "at very high and near-term risk of irreversible biodiversity loss." A Technical Advisory Panel identified 2.6 million hectares of ancient, rare, and big-tree old growth requiring urgent protection.

=== Implementation record ===
Five years after the government's commitment, environmental organizations documented that zero of the 14 recommendations had been fully implemented. By 2025, the government had deferred only 1.2 million hectares- 46% of the 2.6 million hectares identified as priority areas by scientists- leaving 1.4 million hectares of the most endangered forests still open to logging. Sierra Club BC's analysis of provincial data revealed that old-growth logging remained essentially unchanged from pre-review levels, averaging approximately 150 soccer fields per day from 2019 through 2021, despite government claims of "record low" harvests.

The most critical implementation failure involved Recommendation 6, which called for immediate deferrals of at-risk ecosystems within the first six months. Environmental groups issued joint report cards documenting that the March 2021 deadline passed with "almost all at-risk forests remaining open to logging." Ken Wu, Executive Director of the Ancient Forest Alliance, stated in September 2025: "The BC government promised an ecological paradigm shift in its system of old-growth forest management, but five years later, they have resumed their heel-dragging on policy progress to buy time for the destructive status quo of old-growth liquidation."

Grand Chief Stewart Phillip of the Union of BC Indian Chiefs declared on the five-year anniversary: "Five years after the Old Growth Strategic Review, so little has changed...it feels like lip service." A coalition of 88 BC organizations issued an open letter documenting that the Biodiversity and Ecosystem Health Framework- the review's most critical legal mechanism- remained delayed with no public timeline after five years.

=== Connection to Fairy Creek ===
The Walbran Valley blockade follows the 2020-2021 Fairy Creek old-growth logging protests, located approximately 12 kilometres from the current blockade site. The Fairy Creek protests resulted in 1,188 arrests between May and December 2021, making them the largest act of civil disobedience in Canadian history. Several participants in the Walbran blockade, including Pacheedaht Elder Bill Jones and protester Will O'Connell, were prominent figures in the Fairy Creek protests. The Walbran Valley was also a focus of the "War in the Woods" protests of the 1980s and 1990s, which extended to Clayoquot Sound. In December 2024, the BC NDP and BC Green Party signed a cooperation agreement that included a commitment to permanently protect the Fairy Creek watershed, though the agreement did not address broader old-growth protections in the region.

=== Upper Walbran geography and protection status ===
The Walbran Valley is located on the southwest coast of Vancouver Island. In 1995, the British Columbia government created Carmanah Walbran Provincial Park, which protected the lower Walbran Valley while leaving the upper Walbran outside the park boundary and open to logging. The contested logging area is within Tree Farm Licence 44 (TFL 44), which was historically held by MacMillan Bloedel before passing to Weyerhaeuser and then to Western Forest Products. In recent years, Huu-ay-aht First Nations became a 35 percent partner in the licence.

Only 5,500 of the valley's 13,000 hectares are protected. The Upper Walbran was never included in the BC government's temporary deferrals enacted in the central part of the valley in 2021.

=== Upper Walbran exclusion from deferrals ===
The Upper Walbran Valley was specifically identified by the Old Growth Strategic Review's Technical Advisory Panel as a priority area requiring deferral to prevent irreversible biodiversity loss. Ministry officials acknowledged in 2025 that "there is some overlap with old growth technical advisory panel deferral areas" in Upper Walbran. However, when the BC government secured two-year deferrals for the adjacent Fairy Creek (1,184 hectares) and Central Walbran (1,489 hectares) in June 2021, it specifically excluded Upper Walbran from protection, leaving eight approved cut blocks open for logging.

The exclusion occurred despite the Upper Walbran containing some of Vancouver Island's last intact old-growth watersheds with thousand-year-old trees including giant Sitka spruce and western red cedar. Environmental organizations argued the decision prioritized immediate economic concerns over scientific recommendations for ecosystems at very high risk. The approved logging operations by Tsawak-qin Forestry were valued at approximately $3 million in timber revenue, and the Pacheedaht First Nation stands to receive stumpage revenue from the harvest.

== The blockade ==
=== Establishment of Cougar Camp ===
On August 25, 2025, protesters established a camp blocking a logging road in the Walbran Valley. The camp, called "Cougar Camp" by blockaders, featured a large sculpture of a cougar made from wood reclaimed from past logging activity. The sculpture sat in the middle of the logging road, surrounded by small handmade wooden signs bearing slogans such as "Defend the old growth" and "Protect the sacred." Pacheedaht Elder Bill Jones was present at dawn on the first morning, leading approximately 30 people to block fallers from reaching the eight cut blocks. The blockade prevented Tsawak-qin Forestry from accessing tools, equipment, vehicles, and eight cut blocks on the other side of the blockade. Approximately 12 to 24 people were reported at the camp during early September, with tents and a sheltered kitchen area behind a fence made from rough planks of salvaged cedar.

=== Key participants ===
Will O'Connell, who participated in the Fairy Creek blockades, learned of plans to log the Walbran Valley cut blocks more than a year before the blockade began. After seeing satellite images revealing logging had started, O'Connell said he experienced "a wonderful clarity" about taking action. O'Connell stated: "I spent five years feeling like there should be more I'm doing for the old growth. I should be doing something because I'm feeling a continuous sadness for the loss of these places and the betrayal of the government, who is continually not acting." Pacheedaht Elder Bill Jones, who was at the forefront of the Fairy Creek protests, was named as one of the parties in the court filing and the only person to respond to the injunction application. Others named in the court documents included John Doe, Jane Doe, and "persons unknown."

=== Motivation and policy context ===
The Wilderness Committee characterized the five years since the review as "five lost years," with Tobyn Neame stating in 2024: "The endless delays from the BC NDP are resulting in the destruction of irreplaceable forests they vowed to protect." Stand.earth's satellite analysis revealed that logging occurred in 324 areas the government had counted as deferred, with 31,800 hectares of candidate deferral areas destroyed between 2020 and 2025 during government reviews and consultations.

== Legal proceedings ==
=== Injunction application ===
Tsawak-qin Forestry Inc. and Tsawak-qin Forestry Limited Partnership filed for an injunction to protect their permitted logging operations from interference. The company's request stated that the Fairy Creek blockade "resulted in a significant breakdown in the rule of law" and warned the Walbran situation "risks spinning out of control again" unless the court intervened. A statement posted on the company's website on September 8 stated that Pacheedaht First Nation Chief and Council, whose territory the cut blocks are on, consented to Tsawak-qin's logging plans. The statement said: "Our planned activity incorporates specific measures to integrate cultural and ecological priorities, including the protection of culturally significant trees, support for traditional bark harvesting and respect for Indigenous Knowledge."

=== Court hearings ===
The British Columbia Supreme Court heard arguments from both sides on September 9 and September 11, 2025, in Vancouver. On September 9, following a call-out for support from Fairy Creek social media accounts, approximately two dozen observers attended the morning proceedings. Lawyers representing Tsawak-qin argued the blockade was unlawful and undemocratic, preventing legal harvesting activities. They stated the blockade put 11 forestry jobs and millions in revenue at risk during a "critical time" of year for harvesting, as machinery cannot operate in heavy rain. The company also raised safety concerns, saying a fire truck and emergency transport vehicle were inaccessible behind the blockade. One of Tsawak-qin's lawyers described Cougar Camp as a "sophisticated, targeted and well-funded blockade" organized by the same group that carried out the Fairy Creek blockades.

Ben Isitt, the lead lawyer representing Bill Jones, argued that the value of the forests for biodiversity and cultural survival outweigh the claims of economic harm by the logging company. The defence argued that threats to life and liberty posed by climate change constitute a threat to everyone, with disproportionate impacts on the Canadian Arctic, coastal communities, and Indigenous peoples. The defence also claimed Jones's constitutional rights as an Indigenous person would be harmed, and that ecological impacts to the forest would cause harm to his cultural and Aboriginal rights. At one point during the September 9 proceedings, Justice Francis reprimanded observers for laughing when the company's lawyers invoked democratic process, asking them to be respectful.

=== Court decision ===
On the morning of September 12, 2025, Justice Amy Francis granted the injunction, concluding that "counsel for Mr. Jones has made no effort to explain or suggest that the protesters' conduct is legal. This is because it is illegal." Francis said that protests "are part of a healthy democracy. Criminal conduct is not."

Francis stated: "The court in such circumstances, has no choice but to protect the lawful conduct and business of the plaintiff, and to address the illegality of the defendant's behaviour. In these circumstances, I find the rule-of-law considerations must prevail, and the balance of convenience weighs in favour of granting the injunction."

Francis clarified that the case was "not about the wisdom of government forest policy" and "decidedly not about the court's views on whether and where old-growth logging should occur in this province, even in the context of climate change, in an injunction application." She stated: "Those are matters outside of the constitutional competence of the courts."

The defence had argued the injunction was too broad and that a police enforcement order was unnecessary given the small number of people at the camp. Francis granted an enforcement order but denied a clause that would have empowered police to take "any action that is reasonably necessary to prevent persons from contravening any provision of this order." Francis stated: "I am very reluctant to endow the police with extra enforcement powers beyond those that were granted in the Teal Cedar injunction application," referring to the injunction from the Fairy Creek blockade.

The order prohibits anyone with knowledge of it from impeding access to roads or construction sites in an area bounded by Carmanah Walbran Provincial Park, Cowichan Main Road, Carmanah Main Road, Rosander Main Road, Caycuse Main Road and Gordon River Main Road. Seanna McConnell, chair of the Tsawak-qin board, said the company was pleased the court granted the injunction, pointed to its record of work with First Nations, and said repeated requests for the blockaders to allow passage had not been granted.

=== Contempt proceedings ===
Those arrested during enforcement initially faced civil contempt of court proceedings brought by Tsawak-qin. In January 2026 the company asked the Attorney General of British Columbia to take over the proceedings and determine whether there was sufficient evidence to charge those arrested with criminal contempt, and the province agreed the following month. Criminal contempt of court is not a criminal charge and does not result in a criminal record, though it follows a similar process and can lead to jail time.

In April 2026, lawyers for the Attorney General told the BC Supreme Court that criminal contempt charges had been approved in 10 of 13 cases, the remaining three having failed to meet the BC Prosecution Service's charge assessment standard requiring a substantial likelihood of conviction and a prosecution in the public interest. The Crown said it would seek sentences ranging from a $2,250 fine to 10 days in jail on guilty pleas, and three to 21 days following conviction at trial, depending on whether devices were used to impede arrest and the complexity and risk involved. Tsawak-qin could still pursue civil contempt in the three unapproved cases at its own cost; general manager Geoff Payne declined to say whether it would.

Of the ten charged, seven pleaded guilty and three pleaded not guilty, with trials scheduled for October and December 2026. On August 4, 2026, Justice Anthony Saunders sentenced the first two. Kenni Apt, arrested after attaching themselves to the cougar sculpture, received 12 months' probation with 75 hours of community service or a $2,250 fine. Zoey Barak, arrested after being found in an elevated sling between two trees, was sentenced to seven days in jail. Isitt, representing several of the accused, said the sentences followed the approach Justice Douglas Thompson had taken in the Fairy Creek trials, where protesters received 25 to 100 hours of community service or fines of $750 to $3,000, and four to 10 days in jail for those who had used elevated devices. By early September 2026, three of those who pleaded guilty had been sentenced.

=== Injunction extension ===
The injunction had been set to expire on September 13, 2026. In a ruling delivered in late August 2026, Justice H. William Veenstra extended it to January 31, 2028, citing the "seasonal nature of the work" carried out by the company and its contractors and finding winter a more appropriate time than the height of the work season for any review of the order. Veenstra found uncontested evidence of continuing significant interference with Tsawak-qin's operations and a substantial increase in safety concerns, particularly the evidence of tree spiking, and concluded that the company continued to suffer irreparable harm. He found that protesters had adopted "evolving blockade techniques and tactics" that were steadily more difficult to address. The ruling recorded the company's claim of more than $3 million in lost revenue over the previous year, along with spending on damaged equipment, the risk of reduced cut approvals, and an inability to properly winterize roads. It also noted that the RCMP made at least 14 arrests for breaching the injunction in 2025, and none in 2026.

== First Nations perspectives ==
=== Pacheedaht First Nation leadership ===
The cut blocks in the Walbran Valley are located on Pacheedaht First Nation territory. A statement from Pacheedaht Chief Arliss Daniels posted on Tsawak-qin's website called the blockade "an unlawful obstruction" and stated: "Blockaders must immediately vacate the area. Our lands are not to be misused or disrespected under any circumstances." In September 2025, five southern Nuu-chah-nulth nations- the Ditidaht, Hupacasath, Huu-ay-aht, Tseshaht and Uchucklesaht- issued a statement of "unequivocal support" for Pacheedaht.

=== Huu-ay-aht First Nations ===
Tsawak-qin Forestry Limited Partnership is a joint venture between Huu-ay-aht First Nations and Western Forest Products, with Western Forest Products as majority shareholder. The partnership holds logging rights in the area and initiated the injunction application.

=== Bill Jones's position ===
Pacheedaht Elder Bill Jones, who supported the Fairy Creek blockades despite opposition from elected Pacheedaht leadership, is a central figure in the Walbran blockade. Jones was the only named defendant to respond to the injunction application, represented by lawyer Ben Isitt. Outside the courtroom, Isitt stated: "In a planet that's burning, it's non-negotiable for Bill [Jones], protecting those forests. That's the context for this dispute. And ultimately, we need the province to step in and honour its commitments."

Jones filed a federal court application for judicial review against the Pacheedaht First Nation on September 9, 2025, claiming the nation unlawfully consented to forestry activities within its territory without consulting him and other Pacheedaht members. According to court documents, the nation consented to roadbuilding and logging in the Upper Walbran on June 2, 2025; Jones said he learned of the agreement on September 4. According to Jones, he does not view the Indian Act-elected Pacheedaht band council as legitimate, instead viewing it as a forced colonial system to control Indigenous people, and believes in traditional hereditary governance systems. In response to the injunction decision, Jones stated: "I'm very sad- my people are now in the thick of destroying our land. I'm disappointed the judge prioritized the logging company's interests over my rights and the health of the forest."

In 2026, Jones, then 86 and living in a care home in Sooke, continued to visit the valley. He linked the pace of logging to the Pacheedaht and Ditidaht treaty negotiations, which advanced to the final stage of negotiation after an Agreement in Principle was signed in 2019, and said he opposed ratification because the settlement would be outweighed by band debt from a sawmill upgrade.

== Ecology and forest management ==
=== Old-growth forest characteristics ===
The blockade aims to prevent logging of eight cut blocks in the Walbran Valley containing old-growth forest. The Walbran Valley is home to one of Vancouver Island's last intact old-growth watersheds. Environmental groups describe the valley as one of the most spectacular rainforests threatened by clearcut logging on southern Vancouver Island. The valley also provides nesting habitat for the marbled murrelet, a threatened seabird that nests only in old-growth canopy; scientists and forest defenders gathered in the Upper Walbran in 2026 to document the species.

=== Logging activity and government policy ===
According to a publicly available database maintained by the provincial Ministry of Forests, Tsawak-qin Forestry logged nearly 200,000 cubic metres of trees in TFL 44 in 2024. Slightly more than one in five of those trees were red cedar and cypress, two tree species of deep cultural significance to coastal First Nations. Other commonly logged species included Douglas fir and hemlock, along with small amounts of white pine, a species that has suffered severe population declines due to introduced blister rust and extensive logging.

The logging data shows that approximately one in every five trees logged by Tsawak-qin ended up as "avoidable waste"- trees cut down but not hauled away for processing. Forest ecologist Andy MacKinnon noted this practice, stating: "It's only 'waste' if you're trying to produce timber. From an ecosystem perspective, it's important habitat for many species. And it won't be replicated in the managed, post-logging land base."

=== Definitions of old growth ===
Much of the dispute turns on how old growth is defined. The BC government defines it by age, counting coastal stands over 250 years old, and reports that roughly 39 percent of Vancouver Island's forested land, about 770,000 hectares, still qualifies, with some 80 percent of that in parks or no-harvest zones. The Ancient Forest Alliance, the Wilderness Committee and allied scientists argue this measure groups stunted bog and subalpine trees with productive valley-bottom forest, allowing the province to claim protection for the least contested timber while the rarest and most productive stands continue to be logged. By their count, high-productivity old growth makes up about three percent of what remains provincially, the largest valley-bottom ecosystems have been reduced to roughly 35,000 hectares across BC, and more than 80 percent of high-productivity old growth on Vancouver Island has already been logged, including up to 90 percent of valley bottoms.

=== Implementation of Old Growth Strategic Review ===
The blockade occurred five years after the BC government released "A New Future for Old Forests" in September 2020, which recommended a "paradigm shift" in forest management. The review panel warned that "the priorities that currently drive our forest management system are backwards" and offered 14 recommendations to improve forest management. While the NDP government promised to implement all recommendations with a goal of achieving this by 2023, environmental advocates have argued that implementation has been insufficient.

Environmental organizations have conducted annual assessments of the province's progress on the recommendations, issuing a failing grade each year since the review's release. The Wilderness Committee described the five years since the review as "five lost years." Protester Will O'Connell called the government's failure to fully implement the recommendations "gut-wrenching," stating: "There are greater travesties happening in the world than the destruction of our last ancient forests, but this is our forest, this is our backyard and it's something we can change and we can choose to do it differently."

The BC government has stated it protected 9 million hectares of the 11.1 million hectares of old growth in the province and has several projects underway to respond to each recommendation. The Ministry of Forests stated it has "taken unprecedented action to protect at-risk old growth, including safeguarding 1,489 hectares in the Walbran watershed."

== RCMP enforcement ==
=== Timeline and approach ===
As of September 12, 2025, the timing and methods of RCMP enforcement remained unclear. Ahead of the court's decision, the RCMP declined to comment on a timeline for enforcing the injunction and did not immediately respond to questions about what enforcement would entail. On September 9, while court proceedings were underway in Vancouver, people at Cougar Camp were building a small cabin to offer Bill Jones and other Indigenous Elders visiting the camp more comfort than a tent or vehicle. The cabin featured a split red cedar door and a small wood stove. O'Connell stated: "We're building this whole thing up and we're here and we're just waiting for the RCMP to come in and destroy everything we created in terms of a community and infrastructure." The injunction went unenforced for two and a half months.

=== November 2025 enforcement ===
On the morning of November 25, 2025, Lake Cowichan RCMP, assisted by the Critical Response Unit - British Columbia (CRU-BC) and a Police Liaison Team, moved to enforce the injunction at Cougar Camp, where 15 to 20 people were present. Most left peacefully. Four people were arrested, three for breaching the injunction and one for criminal mischief, and two who had locked themselves to the cougar sculpture were removed before the sculpture was dismantled. Those arrested were released and scheduled for court appearances in January 2026.

Protesters retook the road overnight and built a wooden barrier, and police returned the following morning to extricate people who had chained themselves to it. By November 27 the RCMP had made seven arrests, the camp had been cleared, and Tsawak-qin resumed operations. Participants said structures at the camp, including the cabin built for Jones, were burned during the operation, and Jones said he had been denied access to a place he used for spiritual practice.

=== December 2025 enforcement ===
A new camp was established at a different location almost immediately after the November clearance, and protesters also set up a camp they called Beaver Camp. On December 8, police resumed operations on the Walbran Forest Service Road and found structures erected on the only bridge leading to a worksite the company needed to reach. Four men were arrested within two hours, one for obstruction after allegedly resisting arrest and one for breaching release conditions imposed after his November arrest. The encampment on the bridge was dismantled and the road cleared. The RCMP placed the running total at eleven arrests: eight for breaching the injunction, one for criminal mischief, one for obstruction of police, and one for breach of release conditions. A participant later described the December operation as involving roughly 20 officers moving through the camp in formation, extracting a woman suspended in a tree pod and an 85-year-old former logger who had locked himself to a wooden elk sculpture.

=== Concerns about police conduct ===
The RCMP's enforcement of injunctions during the Fairy Creek old-growth logging protests was criticized by the Civilian Review and Complaints Commission (CRCC). The commission's 2024 report found that RCMP officers took "frequent unreasonable actions" during the Fairy Creek blockades and used "disproportionately intrusive" methods while enforcing the injunction. The report concluded: "The commission is concerned about similarly broad and intrusive strategies being implemented during future protests, leading to similarly unreasonable searches and arrests."

In court, the defence argued the injunction was too broad, putting the safety and civil liberties of people at the blockade at risk. Speaking outside the courtroom, Isitt warned: "There's a very high risk that the police will act with disregard for people's basic human rights, as they did at Fairy Creek. So, if the judge feels she must issue an order, the terms need to be narrow, need to be carefully fashioned, to limit the risk of police abuse to the greatest extent possible." One of Tsawak-qin's lawyers dismissed these concerns, telling the court: "The police are accountable, and there are methods for keeping them accountable. Blockaders seek to avoid accountability for their unlawful acts, for taking matters into their own hands when they have a concern with public policy." As of September 12, 2025, the RCMP had not immediately responded to questions about whether any actions or changes had been undertaken in its approach to enforcing injunctions since the commission's report was released.

Justice Francis acknowledged concerns about police conduct, stating she was "very reluctant" to give police extra enforcement powers because of the "serious overreach" that occurred at Fairy Creek, which included completely blocking public roads. She denied a clause requested by Tsawak-qin that would have empowered police to take "any action that is reasonably necessary to prevent persons from contravening any provision of this order." Francis added: "If enforcement becomes a problem, it is open to the plaintiff or the RCMP to come back to court to have the injunction varied."

The injunction included language requiring that it must not infringe on media access, addressing concerns raised after RCMP created exclusion zones during the Fairy Creek protests that prevented media coverage and led to the arrest of photojournalist Colin Smith, despite charter rights and a 2021 BC court decision that found RCMP did not have the power to prevent press access.

==== Reactions ====
O'Connell reflected on the changed atmosphere since the Fairy Creek blockades, stating that the hope that blocking logging roads would save ancient trees had diminished. "We all did everything we could," he told The Narwhal. "It's just hard to be here expecting to lose and still doing it." Outside the courtroom, Isitt described the legal proceedings as an "uphill battle," stating: "Case law in B.C. has moved in a disturbing direction, placing more weight on the interests of industry than on Indigenous interests and ecological concerns."

== Continued protest activity ==
=== Monitoring and gate actions ===
Logging of the cut blocks proceeded after the camp was cleared, and the company installed a gate on the access road. By mid-2026, participants had shifted from blockading to monitoring, maintaining a watch camp on a side road short of the gate with five to 10 people present at a time, recording licence plates and filming truck movements. Members of a group calling itself the Walbran Watchdogs were in the area daily in June and July 2026 and recorded video of large old-growth trees being hauled out on flatbed trucks. The group reported that it had not blocked roads or logging equipment since the December 2025 arrests.

In July 2026, the watch camp was closed on the instruction of Jones and a group of Elders, publicly because of a marmot denning nearby, and participants shifted to car-camping in an open field and gathering at the gate before dawn. On one such morning, five people chained themselves to the gate at approximately 3:30 a.m. and dispersed into the trees before police arrived. Jones described those maintaining the vigil as "the last guardians of our old growth" and said any future camp should be organized around the matriarchs and Elders of the territory.

=== Tree spiking ===
Investigations found that several hundred trees in Tsawak-qin's cut blocks had been embedded with metal spikes, many with their heads cut off and bark placed over the top, making them difficult to detect. On August 18, 2026, two fallers employed by a contractor struck spikes and had their chainsaws damaged beyond repair. Neither was injured, but Justice Veenstra's ruling noted that tree spikes carry "significant risk of injury or death" to fallers and sawmill workers, and treated the practice as evidence of escalating safety concerns supporting extension of the injunction. Forests Minister Ravi Parmar had earlier condemned reports of tree spiking at the Fairy Creek blockade as a "dangerous criminal activity" that put workers at risk.

== See also ==
- Fairy Creek old-growth logging protests
- Old-growth forest
- Clayoquot protests
- Tree spiking
