= Charles Woodruff =

Charles Woodruff may refer to:

- Charles Woodruff (archer) (1846–1927), American Olympic archer
- Charles Armijo Woodruff (1884–1945), 11th Governor of American Samoa
- Charles E. Woodruff, (1860-1915), American military surgeon, sanitarian, and writer.
- Charles Woodruff (general) (1845–1920)
- Charlie Woodruff (1884–1943), English footballer

== See also ==
- Charles Woodruff House (disambiguation) two National Register of Historic Places locations
