= Geoff Jones =

Geoff or Geoffrey Jones may refer to:

- Geoff Jones (footballer, born 1930) (1930–2018), Australian rules footballer for St Kilda
- Geoff Jones (footballer, born 1944), Australian rules footballer for North Melbourne
- Geoffrey Jones (1931–2005), British documentary film director and editor
- Geoffrey Jones (academic), British-born business historian
- John Geoffrey Jones (1928–2014), British judge

== See also ==
- Jeffrey Jones (disambiguation)
