= Fairy Creek old-growth logging protests =

Ongoing environmentalist and indigenous rights protests

Fairy Creek
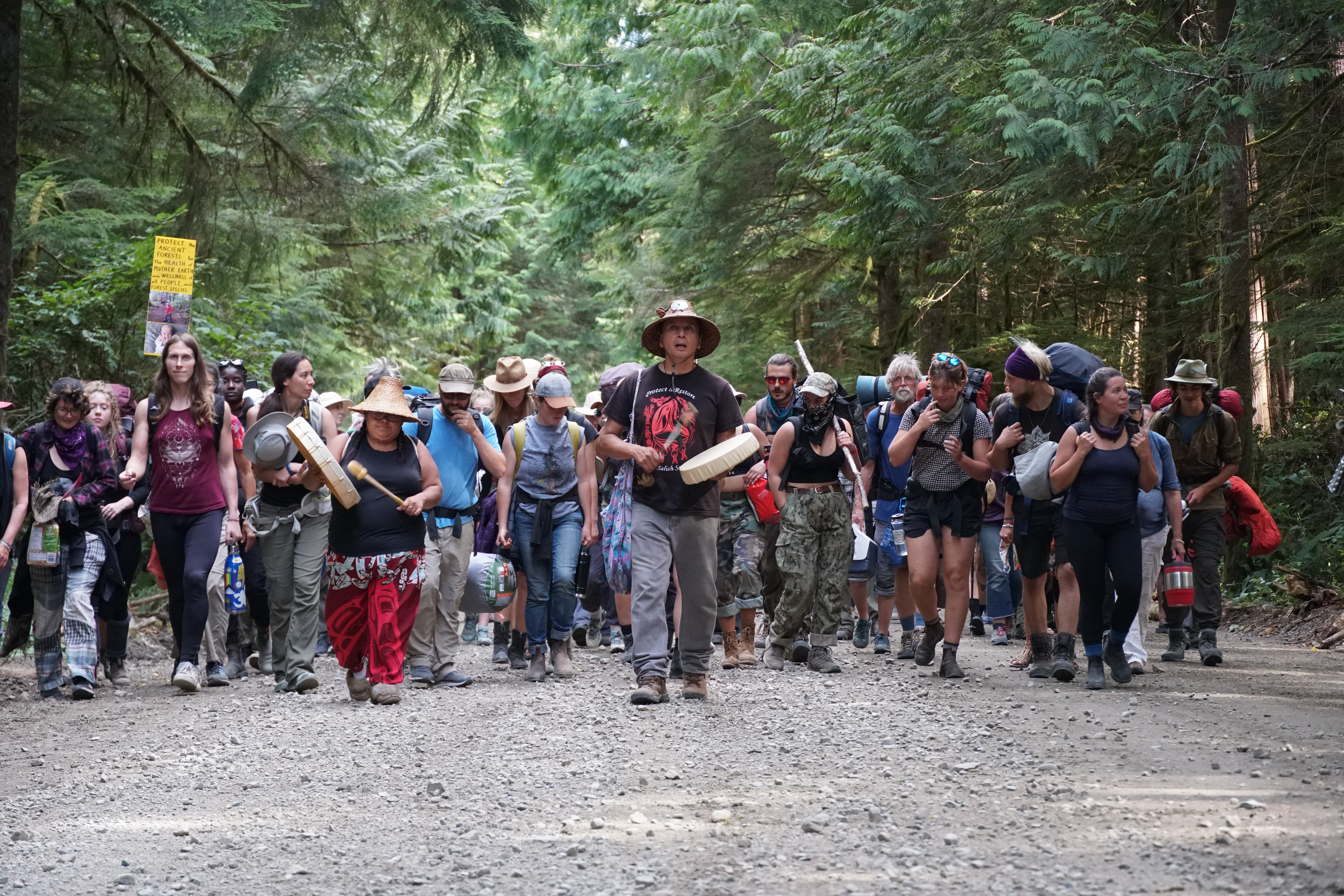
- Protesters retake "Camp Land Back" from the RCMP at the Fairy Creek blockade, August 2021

- Location within British Columbia

Geography
- Location: Vancouver Island
- Coordinates: 48°35′1″N 124°21′0″W

Administration
- Canada
- Province: British Columbia
- Regional district: Capital Regional District
- Pacheedaht First Nation

Protests against old-growth logging in the southern Vancouver Island region of British Columbia (BC), Canada, escalated through later 2020 and into 2021. These events, many coalescing around the Fairy Creek watershed northeast of Port Renfrew, represent a critical moment in BC's recurring history of conflict related to ecological values and the forest industry, recalling the Clayoquot Protests (or "War in the Woods") of the early 1990s. With 1,188 arrests made by December 2021, it is the largest act of civil disobedience in Canadian history.

== Background ==
In August 2020, protests against old growth logging began to escalate in remaining sensitive watershed areas in southern Vancouver Island. Precipitating events included the release in Fall 2020 of a major report and recommendations related to managing and protecting old growth forests in British Columbia and subsequent delay in implementation of the report recommendations, together with increased logging activity in sensitive old growth areas of South Vancouver Island, including the Fairy Creek Watershed, by Teal Jones, a forestry company based in Nanaimo.

=== Indigenous peoples in the region ===
The Fairy Creek Watershed is in Pacheedaht First Nation territory. Pacheedaht elected leadership distanced itself from logging protest activity in 2021, citing their right to manage territorial resources within their resource stewardship plan. Pacheedaht First Nation entered into a forest revenue agreement with the BC government in 2017. In terms of stewardship, First Nations involved in the forestry industry may exceed provincial logging and replanting standards while relying on forestry activities to build and diversify their economies; through forest revenues Pacheedaht First Nation has purchased businesses and fee simple land in its territory, buying lands back from private developers. In return for revenue sharing over a three-year term, the agreement requires the Nation not to support or participate in any acts that interfere with provincially authorized forest activities, and requires the Nation to support the provincial government in seeking to resolve actions taken by members that are seen to be inconsistent with the agreement.

However, as the direct descendant from the family line claimed as the hereditary decision-makers or speakers for the territory, Pacheedaht Elder Bill Jones supported protest activity, speaking for careful stewardship of the Fairy Creek Watershed, and against the destruction of remaining sacred places for short term gain. Leaders from Tsleil-Waututh Nation travelled to Fairy Creek in Pacheedaht territory on May 29 to show their support.

On June 4, 2021, Huu-ay-aht, Ditidaht, and Pacheedaht First Nations signed the Hišuk ma c̕awak Declaration to take back their power over their ḥahahuułi (traditional territories), and on the following day gave formal notice to the province of BC to defer old-growth logging for two years in the Fairy Creek and the Central Walbran areas while the Nations prepare their stewardship plans. This request was approved by the BC government five days later on June 9, 2021, although logging activity and arrest of protestors continued as before.

Doug White (Kwulasultun), former chief and councillor of Snuneymuxw First Nation, a practicing lawyer and chairman of the BC First Nations Justice Council, situated the Hišuk ma c̕awak Declaration in the broader context of Aboriginal title in BC, in relation to Delgamuukw v. British Columbia, the Tŝilhqot'in decision, and the United Nations Declaration on the Rights of Indigenous Peoples (UNDRIP), asserting that the existing forestry regime of tenure and permits is inconsistent with Aboriginal rights, title and implementation of decision-making.

In June 2023, the BC government extended the order to defer logging at Fairy Creek until February 1, 2025.[16] On January 29, 2025, the government announced a further extension until September 30, 2026, to allow continued discussions on long-term management of the watershed in partnership with the Pacheedaht First Nation.

=== Ecology and wildlife ===
On May 31, 2021, the BC Ministry of Forests, Lands, Natural Resource Operations and Rural Development announced that reported sightings of endangered western screech owls in the area had been confirmed. Radar surveys by the BC Wilderness Committee in July 2021 also reported over 240 sightings of endangered marbled murrelets in the Fairy Creek watershed and surrounding areas.

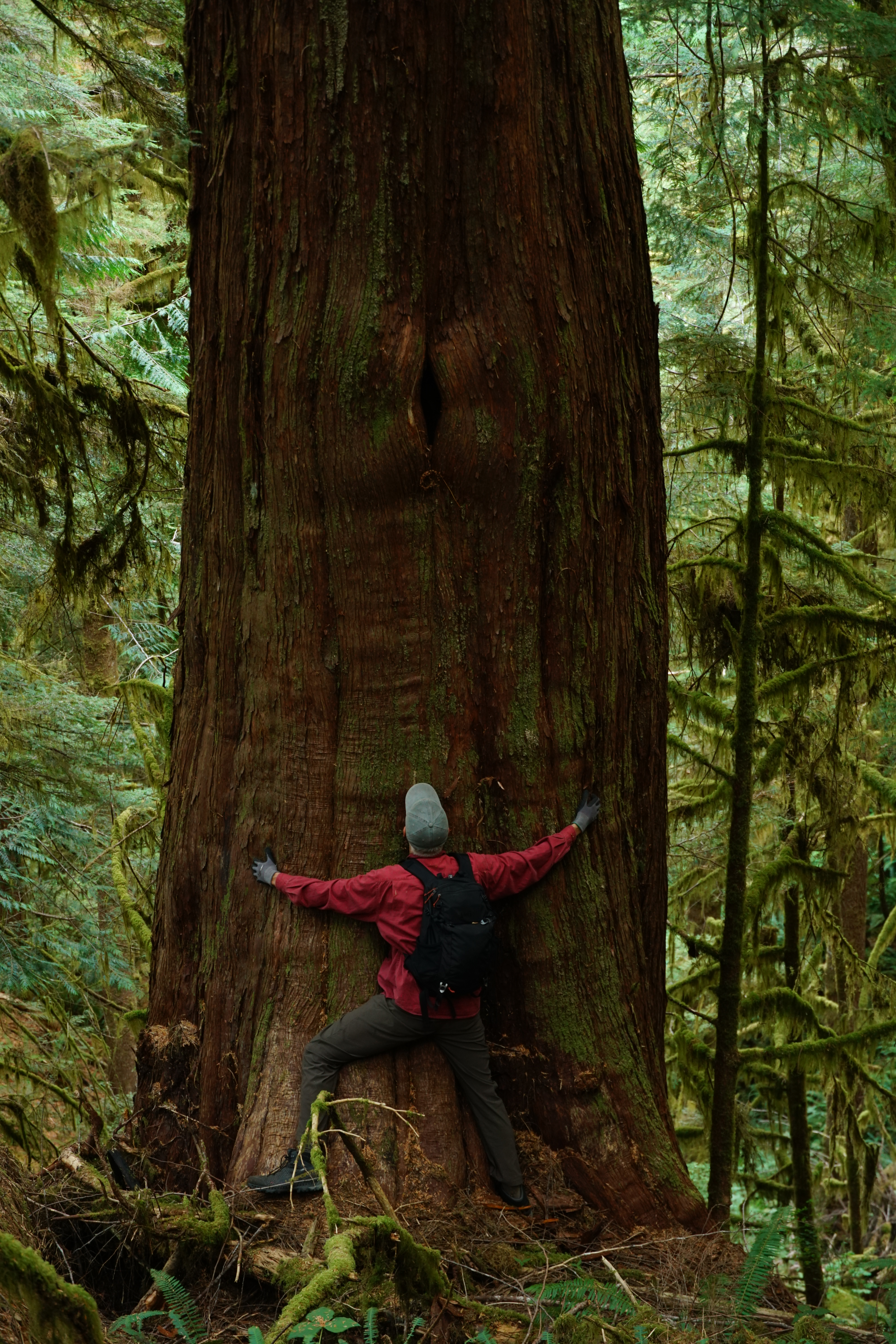
Old growth tree set to be cut down in the Caycuse Watershed TFL 44

The Fairy Creek watershed contains massive yellow cedar trees, including specimens measuring more than three metres in diameter and estimated to be close to 2,000 years old. Some trees in the area are between 500 and 1,000 years old. Approximately 75% of the forest is over 250 years old.

Several instances of the rare lichen old-growth specklebelly (Pseudocyphellaria rainierensis) have been found on trees within Fairy Creek. The lichen's presence is due to the nutrient hotspots created by old-growth yellow cedar in the watershed.

Old-growth forests in the region are among the most biodiverse ecosystems in the world. The massive trees sequester large amounts of carbon and support thriving networks of organisms from fungi, microbes and plants to vertebrates. The forests are fire-resistant, protecting the ecosystems they shelter and the carbon they contain.

The watershed plays a critical role in regional ecological systems. Salmon consume ocean nutrients and carry them upstream, where eagles, bears and other predators spread salmon carcasses throughout the forest, transferring marine nutrients inland. These interconnected systems mean that declining salmon populations negatively affect forests, while forest degradation impacts salmon runs. Historic industrial logging in the region destroyed salt grass marshes in river estuaries that nurtured juvenile salmon, contributing to the decline of salmon populations that are a primary food source for the Pacheedaht First Nation.

== Blockades and protests ==
In spite of COVID-19 pandemic conditions, protest activity was sustained through Spring 2021, with social media calls going out for reinforcements as police removed activists from various camps and sites. Arrests and removals were made more difficult by what one visiting journalist described as highly inventive approaches taken by the protesters, who in many cases constructed "dragons" made of pipe and concrete to more effectively chain to equipment or roadbed ("sleeping dragons"), or who cantilevered themselves in high places where it would be difficult and time-consuming to extract them ("flying dragons").

On May 22, 2021, a visit to Fairy Creek by Tzeporah Berman, veteran of the Clayoquot protests of the 1990s and international programs director with Stand.Earth, ended in arrest for defying an exclusion zone being enforced by the RCMP. Days later, scores of senior citizens joined protesters at Fairy Creek at the invitation of Pacheedaht Elder Bill Jones, passing unchallenged through the RCMP blockade. Protests were also held in locations in Greater Victoria, including at the constituency office of British Columbia Premier John Horgan, whose electoral riding area includes disputed old-growth forest and overlaps Pacheedaht territory.

By late August 2021, measured in terms of arrests, the Fairy Creek protests approached Canada's civil disobedience record, a threshold set in 1993 when 856 people were arrested during the "war in the woods" over old-growth logging in Clayoquot Sound, and one of the biggest acts of civil disobedience in Canadian history.

On September 28, 2021, B.C. Supreme Court Justice Douglas Thompson refused to extend the Teal-Jones injunction, criticizing RCMP enforcement tactics and noting that enforcement methods "led to serious and substantial infringement of civil liberties, including impairment of the freedom of the press to a marked degree." However, on October 8, 2021, B.C. Court of Appeal Justice Sunni Stromberg-Stein overturned the decision and granted Teal-Jones a temporary injunction, citing potential economic harm to the company.

== Media and protest coverage ==
On May 19, 2021, the RCMP arrested a journalist attempting to cover the protests, alleging the journalist had been obstructing the work of the logging company. However, videos posted on social media showed the journalist in question asking police what he was obstructing without answer just prior to the arrest.

In May 2021 the Rainforest Flying Squad, an environmentalist group focused on the Fairy Creek Blockade, alleged that Instagram deleted their account after they posted a video showing aggressive RCMP arrests of protesters. The group's account was restored the next day, with a Facebook spokesperson stating that it had been deleted in error.

On May 26, the Canadian Association of Journalists, the Aboriginal Peoples Television Network, The Narwhal, along with several other media outlets, announced that they would be suing the RCMP over restrictions the police were imposing on media access to the protests. On July 20, 2021, the court action, initiated by a coalition of press groups including the Canadian Association of Journalists, Ricochet Media, Capital Daily Victoria, The Narwhal, Canada's National Observer, APTN News, The Discourse, Indiginews, and Canadian Journalists for Free Expression, received a favourable decision in the British Columbia Supreme Court. The media groups' application was granted to add a clause to the injunction order granted to logging company Teal Jones in April, instructing the RCMP not to interfere with media access absent a bona fide operational reason for doing so.

== Arrests and policing ==
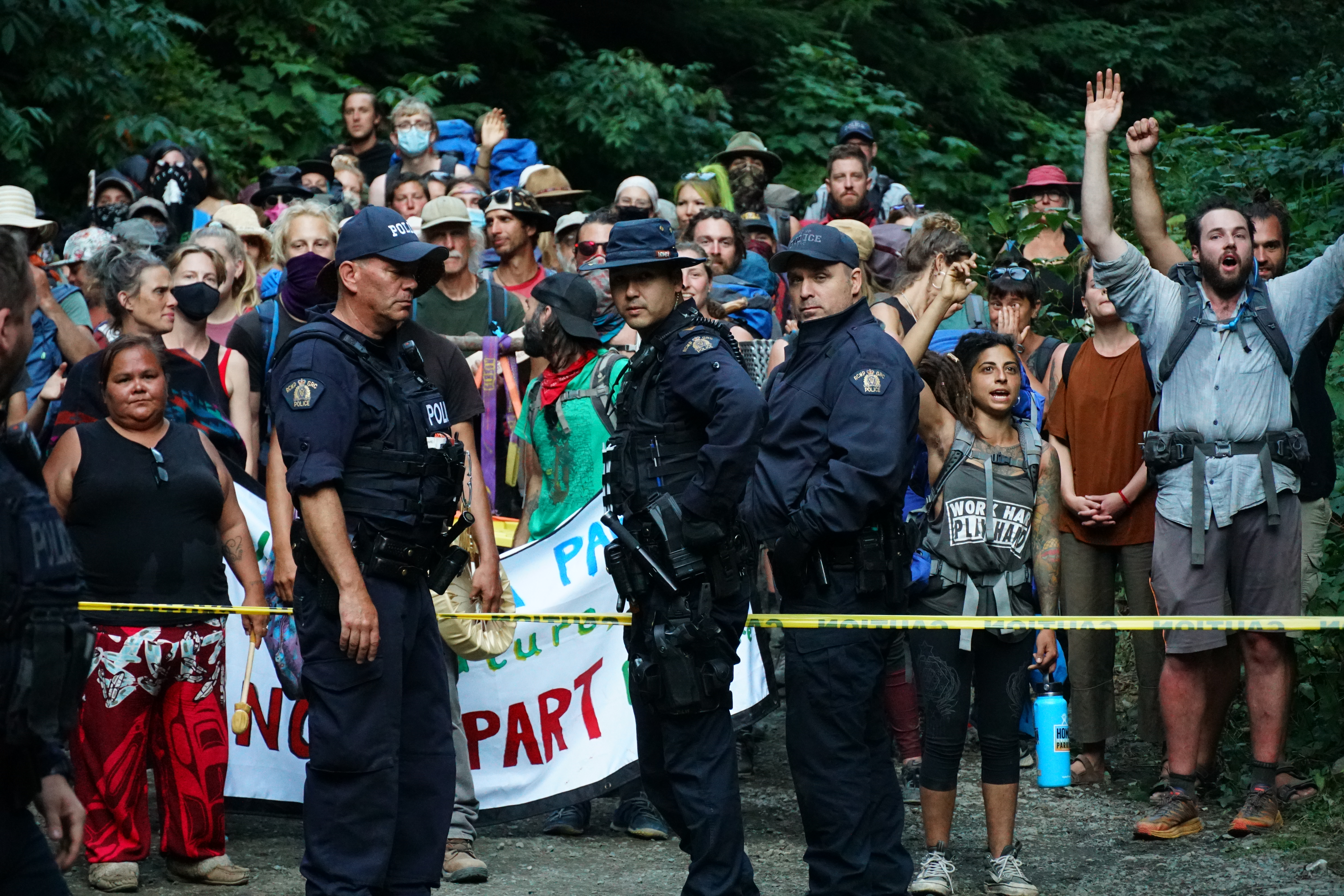
RCMP officers and protesters during the protests

On May 28, 2021, the RCMP arrested every protester at the Waterfall Blockade, except for one, stating that they had been unable to arrest that protester safely. The next day, several hundred protesters marched on the site, re-establishing the blockade. On August 9, 2021, the one year anniversary of the blockade, the RCMP raided Fairy Creek headquarters for the first time. Officers notified protesters they had 24 hours to evacuate the area, however witnesses reported the RCMP began enforcement before the injunction period ended. Over 20 protesters were arrested and the nearby Heli Camp was disbanded soon after. As of February 11, 2022, over 1,000 protesters had been arrested.

In addition to the July 2021 court action against the RCMP initiated by media outlets, Rainforest Flying Squad reported individual journalists and protesters had submitted over a dozen complaints against the RCMP by August 2021. Complaints included excessive force, confiscation of food and water, and unlawful apprehension of personal possessions, vehicles, and items providing media access, including a satellite dish. The RCMP came under further criticism when a number of its officers were seen wearing thin blue line patches while on duty at the site, despite official RCMP guidelines forbidding the symbol.

=== Enforcement costs and oversight ===
Documents obtained through access to information requests revealed that RCMP enforcement at Fairy Creek cost $18,716,968 between April 1 and December 2021. The majority of costs came from personnel ($4.7 million) and transportation and telecommunications ($1.4 million).

The RCMP's enforcement tactics came under significant scrutiny. Nearly 500 formal complaints about RCMP conduct were submitted to the Civilian Review and Complaints Commission (CRCC). More than 100 grievances accepted for investigation contained allegations of excessive force, illegal tactics, unprofessional behaviour, racism, discrimination and charter violations by the force's Community-Industry Response Group (C-IRG).

In September 2021, an RCMP officer with 13 years of experience resigned from C-IRG, citing "unjustifiable" police actions at Fairy Creek. In March 2023, the CRCC launched a systemic investigation into C-IRG, focusing on the unit's governance, command and control, and operational planning.

The commission's 2024 report found that RCMP officers took "frequent unreasonable actions" during the Fairy Creek blockades and used "disproportionately intrusive" methods while enforcing the injunction. The report concluded: "The commission is concerned about similarly broad and intrusive strategies being implemented during future protests, leading to similarly unreasonable searches and arrests."

=== Legal outcomes ===
As of May 2022, police had recommended charges for 451 people out of 919 arrests for contempt of court. The Crown approved 403 charges after assessing 438 files. Of the cases that proceeded through the court system by that date, 49 people had either pleaded guilty or been found guilty, with sentences ranging from a $500 fine to 10 days in jail. One person was acquitted.

The acquittal hinged on the language a police officer used when informing protesters of the injunction. The accused was arrested for marching and drumming between police and protesters, but the officer had specifically asked people to remove the blockade. B.C. Supreme Court Justice Douglas Thompson ruled that marching and drumming was not the same as participating in a blockade, resulting in an acquittal.

In April 2023, the B.C. Prosecution Service withdrew contempt charges against 11 protesters, with lawyers expecting charges against approximately 150 others to be dropped. The withdrawals resulted from the RCMP's failure to properly read the full injunction to people arrested during protests. In September 2024, the BC Prosecution Service dropped 146 cases against old-growth logging protesters after Canada's Supreme Court refused to hear an appeal against the acquittal of a demonstrator who had been cleared of criminal contempt.

In September 2023, the court injunction that made it illegal to block logging activity expired, with Teal Cedar not seeking renewal.

== Public awareness and engagement ==
Social media campaigns and online fundraising campaigns mobilized public opinion and resources related to blockades and protests at Fairy Creek and in the forests of South Vancouver Island at a time in the COVID-19 pandemic when travel in British Columbia was largely restricted to essential travel only, within local health authorities.

In spring 2021, actor and photographer Cole Sprouse supported protesters by visiting and sharing a photo essay documenting Fairy Creek old-growth and protest activity. Celebrity support for protesters was also offered by actor Mark Ruffalo and former wrestler Hulk Hogan, and musicians Bruce Cockburn and Midnight Oil, who gave protest organizers permission to use their songs on social media. In June 2021Vogue magazine also carried a photo essay featuring land defenders at Fairy Creek.

On May 24, 2021, poet, writer, and publisher Gary Geddes crossed the police line at Waterfall Camp to be arrested and raise awareness of the protests.

On July 1, 2021, PBS Digital Studios added a video called Terra explaining unique aspects of the temperate rainforest in Fairy Creek, including its mycorrhizal network and canopy soils which are still not fully understood. The call for conservation, narrated by Joe Hanson (host of It's Okay To Be Smart), was uploaded to the PBS website and YouTube channel as part of the Overview series.

== Disappearance of protesters ==
In 2021, two Fairy Creek protesters went missing while participating in the blockade.

On October 21, 2021, Gerald 'Smiley' Kearney was reported missing. He was last seen attempting to hike from Ridge Camp to Heli Camp, across the Fairy Creek watershed. To date, his body has never been found.

On December 11, 2021, a protester named Kevin 'Bear' Henry was declared missing. They had last been in contact with their family on November 27. Henry, who uses they/them pronouns, later told reporters that their van had become stuck in a remote, wooded area. They managed to survive the winter by sheltering inside of a car and surviving "on beans and snow." They were discovered on February 9, 2022, by a group of loggers and evacuated to safety.

== Recent Developments ==
=== 2024 political agreement ===
In December 2024, the BC NDP and Green Party signed a cooperation agreement that included a commitment to "ensure permanent protection of the Fairy Creek watershed" in partnership with the Pacheedaht and Ditidaht First Nations, pending the resolution of existing legal proceedings and community negotiations. The agreement was part of a broader accord on shared priorities including health care, housing, and climate action, to be reviewed annually.

=== Tree spiking allegations ===
In January 2025, the BC Ministry of Forests received packages containing photos allegedly depicting trees spiked with metal rods in the Fairy Creek area. A message with the package indicated it was from "friends of Fairy Creek," though the photos were undated with no location specified. Forest Minister Ravi Parmar condemned the alleged tree spiking as "a dangerous criminal activity that puts the health and safety of B.C.'s forestry workers at risk." The Nanaimo RCMP launched an investigation.

Kathy Code, a member of the Rainforest Flying Squad, denied involvement, stating that tree spiking was "totally against our code of conduct" and would harm both trees and the group's reputation with the public. In 2022, Teal-Jones had reported finding spikes in trees logged from the area, with one spike destroying a saw blade and nearly hitting a worker.

=== Wrongful arrest finding ===
In March 2025, an RCMP Civilian Review and Complaints Commission investigation found that officers wrongfully arrested a historian from Salt Spring Island for obstructing a peace officer near the Fairy Creek protests in 2022.

== Legacy ==
=== Civil lawsuit ===
In January 2024, Teal Cedar launched a civil lawsuit against 15 Fairy Creek protesters, alleging conspiracy and obstruction. The case remained before the courts as of early 2025.

=== Subsequent protests ===
In late August 2025, a new blockade began in the Walbran Valley on southern Vancouver Island, organized by some of the same activists involved in the Fairy Creek protests, including Pacheedaht Elder Bill Jones and protester Will O'Connell. The blockade prevented Tsawak-qin Forestry Limited Partnership, a joint venture between Huu-ay-aht First Nations and Western Forest Products, from accessing logging equipment and cut blocks.

On September 12, 2025, B.C. Supreme Court Justice Amy Francis granted an injunction ordering the blockade removed, stating "counsel for Mr. Jones has made no effort to explain or suggest that the protesters' conduct is legal. This is because it is illegal." The decision paved the way for RCMP enforcement, marking a continuation of old-growth logging conflicts four years after the Fairy Creek protests peaked.

=== Media ===
The protests were profiled in Fairy Creek, a 2024 documentary film by Jen Muranetz. They were also extensively documented in a photojournalism project by artist and musician Ora Cogan.

== See also ==
- 2020 Canadian pipeline and railway protests
