= Jeff Jones (hip-hop musician) =

Jeff Le’Mar Jones aka Jeff Jones is an American rapper and hip-hop and R&B songwriter.

== Biography ==
Jeff Jones was raised in the gang dominated streets of Los Angeles' Compton and South Central neighborhoods. He moved around Southern California from the San Fernando Valley to Palmdale and finally Riverside due to his mother's battle with drug addiction. Jones started rapping and performing at the age of ten, freestyling at school and performing with a local rap group. He was inspired by West Coast hip-hop legends 2Pac, Snoop Dogg, Ice Cube, and DJ Quik and later New York's Notorious B.I.G. before he took a liking to the SWAY and TECH underground hip hop scene. He continued to hone his lyrical skills battle-rapping all over Southern California throughout high school. After a year of hustling to make ends meet, he knew music was his calling and that he was going to need to put all of his energy into pursuing his dream of being a hip-hop artist.

With Jones looking for ways to be noticed, his sister sent a fax to Los Angeles radio station 100.3 The Beat and entered him into Steve Harvey’s Apollo West Talent Showcase to perform his spoken word rap. He emerged with two back-to-back victories and much praise for his exceptional lyrical skills. Jones and his crew 5th Squad began recording music with the help of a local manager. In 2003, Jones got his chance to show what he could do in front of top music industry executives. SpenCow Entertainment executives Demetrius Spencer and JJ Johnson heard Jones freestyle rap and signed him on the spot. They began work immediately on his first album with producer Poli Paul (Chingy, The Black Eyed Peas, Nas & Bravehearts), and within six months Jeff Jones was signed to a major record deal with Elektra Records, then home of platinum recording artists including Fabulous, Missy Elliott, and Busta Rhymes.

He completed recording his first album on Elektra Records “God Given” with features from Trick Daddy, Cee-Lo of Gnarls Barkley, and R&B group Midwest City. His high energy record “We Sum All Stars” off the album was featured in the hit Disney feature film New York Minute and also on the movie soundtrack. In the summer of 2004 Jeff Jones’ first single “Trunk Rattle” hit radio airwaves in the West Coast and Midwest regions, introducing his melodic flow to the masses. Just as he began to promote this record, Elektra Records folded and his deal was lost.

But music business politics and label financial issues were no deterrent to Jones and his love of music. Jones decided to stay in the mix behind the scenes and develop his natural talent for songwriting further by collaborating on new material for other artists. He eventually teamed up with production company label-mate Solo of R&B group Midwest City (Universal/Motown) to form a writing team called “Wryters Block.” Their winning combination of street swagger with soulfulness and melody caught the attention of top producers, hip-hop artists and R&B/pop artists. As songwriters, they have worked with hit artists and producers including Chingy, Christina Milian, Jonathan “JR” Rotem, Jazze Pha, Eric Hudson and many more. Jones also helped to develop young hip-hop group LAX Boyz (One Recordings) and co-wrote most of their album including their first single featuring Jazze Pha “Ride Like This”.

In 2007 Jeff Jones released his debut mixtape via Mic Blazin' Entertainment entitled “I Smell Smoke Vol. 1” hosted by LA's finest DJ Felli Fel of Power 106 and the Heavy Hitters and featuring NE-YO, D. Woods of Danity Kane, LAX Boyz (One Recordings) and Midwest City (Universal Motown) tracks and the sounds of hit producer Poli Paul (Chingy, Black Eyed Peas).

West Coast music source DubCNN.com stated “Jeff Jones is what many will see as a breath of fresh air to the game. With his adaptable style, listener friendly tone, and ability to flow over an array of beats, we are putting money on Jeff Jones becoming a playlist regular over the coming years”

Jeff is currently working on new material with several upcoming hiphop producers and with major artist features to be released worldwide in 2014.

== Albums ==
Jeff Jones "Good Guy Gone Bad" unreleased (2013)

Jeff Jones "I Smell Smoke Vol. 1" hosted by DJ Felli Fel

Jeff Jones "PARANORMAL ACTIVITIES" (http://www.datpiff.com/The_West_Ghost_Jeff_Jones_Paranormal_Activities.m133849.html)

== Singles ==
- "Trunk Rattle" (Elektra Records 2004)
- "Mrs Jones featuring D Woods of Danity Kane" independent/ 2007
- "Cheated On You feat. NeYo" Independent/ 2007
- "DIZZY LOVE" independent/ 2009
- "DO Wrong" independent/ 2009
- "Trampoline" independent/ 2010
- "So What if I Kiss Men on the Lips" Independent/ 2011

== Songwriting credits ==
- DY Featuring Danny Fernandes "Passenger" (Single CP RECORDS 2010)
- E40 feat Bun B and Gucci Mane "Recipe" ("Ball Street Journal" 2009)
- Shawty Lo feat Trey Songs and lil wayne "Supplier" (single 2009),
- Bubba sparxxx feat Ray J "She Got Me Like" (single 2009),
- Adina Howard 'Doin 80" (single 2008)
- Adina Howard "Picture This" (single 2008)
- LAX Boyz ft. Jazze Pha "Ride Like This" (One Recordings 2007)

Produced by Jazze Pha Co-Written by Jeff Jones www.myspace.com/lax1recordings Jazze Pha

- Chingy ft. Midwest City "Cadillac Door" Album: Hoodstar (Capitol 2006)

Produced by Poli Paul Co-Written by Jeff Jones http://xxlmag.com/online/?p=4917

- Chingy "Nike Aurrs & Crispy Tees" Album: Hoodstar (Capitol 2006)

Produced by Polio Paul Co-Written by Jeff Jones

== Soundtracks ==
- "4 Life" starring Wood Harris, Elise Neal, Page Kennedy (Code Black 2007)

Elise Neal ft. Al Kapone & Jeff Jones "I'm Down Baby" Produced by Al Kapone Co-Written by Jeff Jones http://www.codeblackentertainment.com/Products.aspx?productID=37&pageID=Previously

- "New York Minute" starring Mary-Kate & Ashley Olsen (Warner Bros 2004)

Jeff Jones "We Sum All Stars" (Elektra 2004) Produced by Poli Paul; Written by Jeff Jones New York Minute (film)
