= Eden Fineday =

Plains Cree journalist

- Born: Near the Battlefords, Sweetgrass First Nation
- Education: Bachelors in Language Studies
- Occupations: Author, musician, journalist, artist, editor
- Known for: IndigiNews and co-founding Indigenous Media Association of Canada
- Awards: Jack Webster Award (2024)

Eden Fineday is a Plains Cree journalist, artist and musician from Sweetgrass First Nation near the Battlefords, Saskatchewan. She is the publisher of IndigiNews, an Indigenous-led news website opened in 2020.

Fineday grew up in Vancouver, B.C., and as a teenager moved to California, where she started her first band at around 21 years old. She returned to Canada nearly a decade later, where she started the band Vancougar, which released two albums through the Vancouver record label Mint Records. IndigiNews was her first venture into journalism; she was appointed its managing editor in 2021 and became its publisher in 2025.

== Early life ==
Fineday, a nehiyaw iskwew (Cree woman), was born in the Sweetgrass First Nation in Treaty 6 territory near the Battlefords, Saskatchewan. She grew up in East Vancouver, British Columbia, starting at two years old. Fineday has two older siblings and reflected their musical tastes when she was young. Blondie's Parallel Lines and Elvis Costello's My Aim Is True were her favourite records when she was five years old, and later she liked Tom Petty, Pat Benatar, Michael Jackson's Thriller, and Cyndi Lauper's She's So Unusual. She liked female singers when she was young and knew she wanted to become one like Blondie.

Fineday moved to California at 17 years old, dropping out of high school. There, she worked as a public speaker. She later went back to school and earned a bachelors degree in language studies.

== Musical career ==
Fineday began playing the guitar when she was nineteen years old and two years later started her first band, the What-Nots, in Santa Cruz, California. She was lead singer and guitarist of the band.

When Fineday moved back to Canada at 29 years old, in 2003, she had difficulties with the adjustment to a more socially isolated life. In Vancouver, she formed the all-female band Vancougar with fellow bassist Becca Stewart, a fellow Canadian whom she met in Santa Cruz. They began playing at shows in 2003, and she was the lead singer and a guitarist. They released the albums Losin' It (2006) and Canadian Tuxedo (2008) through Mint Records, a Vancouver independent record label. The Georgia Straight described their music as "classic pop with a knowingly ramshackle edge". Around this time she held a job in information management. In 2012, she started a crowdfunding campaign for another album.

== Journalism career ==
Fineday was appointed managing editor of the news website IndigiNews in November 2021. She said IndigiNews was her "first foray" into journalism. The outlet, opened in 2020, was jointly launched by Aboriginal Peoples Television Network and The Discourse and based in British Columbia. According to the Canadian Broadcasting Corporation, it aims to "address the long history of Canadian media poorly representing and perpetuating stereotypes about Indigenous communities."

In a series of IndigiNews articles in 2022, she wrote about her grandfather, Alphonse Little Poplar (1921–1989), and her grandmother, Irene Fineday, and daily life at their reserve, including experiences with the residential school system.

In 2023, Indigenous media organisations including IndigiNews were impacted after Canadian news content was blocked on the social media websites Facebook and Instagram by their owner Meta in response to the Online News Act. Fineday stated that traffic to the website originating from Facebook was 43% of that in the month before the ban.

In 2024, she published two articles on tracking down the bones of great-great-grandfather, ka-mîtosis (or Little Poplar), a Plains Cree warrior. She found out that his remains had been stored in a Smithsonian warehouse in the US, after the American military surgeon Charles E. Woodruff plundered his grave. Later in 2024, she received the Jack Webster Award for "Commentator of the Year" for her work as publisher of IndigiNews.

In early 2025, five journalists including Fineday founded the Indigenous Media Association of Canada (IMAC), a trade group of Indigenous journalists. In an interview with CBC News, the organisation's interim vice-president, Maureen Googoo, stated that the motivation behind its formation was to provide Indigenous media organisations "an equal seat at that table". Fineday also became the publisher of IndigiNews in January 2025, after acquiring the website with a non-profit organisation which she co-founded, tâpwêwin media. As of 2025, she is the non-profit organisation's CEO, while the editorial board comprises three Indigenous journalists.
