= 2021 Nuevo León wildfires =

Natural disaster in Mexico

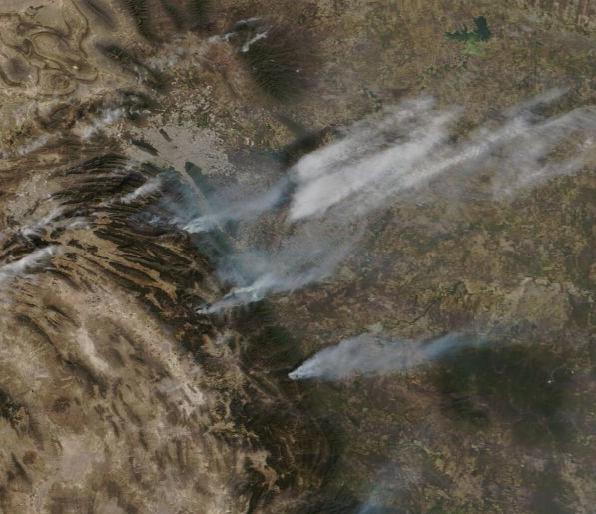
- Wildfires burning in Nuevo León on March 27, 2021
- Date: March – April 2021
- Location: Cumbres de Monterrey National Park near Monterrey, Nuevo León, Mexico

Statistics
- Total fires: 20+
- Total area: 32,000+ hectares (79,000+ acres)

Ignition
- Cause: Drought, high temperatures, and gusty winds

The 2021 Nuevo León wildfires were a series of wildfires that broke out in late March and early April 2021 in the Mexican state of Nuevo León. The wildfires in Nuevo León were fueled mostly by drought, high winds, and high temperatures. Media in Mexico had reported that 12 out of the 61 fires burning across the country were located in 8 protected natural areas, including the Cumbres de Monterrey National Park in the state of Nuevo León. Most of the wildfires that were burning in the state were near the city of Monterrey.

On March 25, 1,100 residents had to be evacuated in at least 14 communities because of a major wildfire that was burning in the Sierra de Santiago region. The fire began in the neighboring state of Coahuila near the city of Arteaga on March 16. The fire was previously at 70% containment days later, but due to wind gusts reaching 90 kilometers per hour, the fire spread quickly over state lines into Nuevo León and authorities issued residents to evacuate immediately.

== Background ==
The Mexico wildfire season mostly starts from March and ends in May. But the 2021 wildfire season in Mexico is one of the worst fire seasons the country has faced in more than a decade, the major wildfires mostly being in Nuevo León. The wildfires in the state are mostly blamed for the ongoing drought in North America that is fueling hundreds of wildfires across the continent. A DC-10 Air Tanker was used to battle the wildfires in the Cumbres de Monterrey National Park. Smoke from the wildfires affected the state's air quality. The smoke from the fires could also be visible from the U.S. state of Florida.
