= 2023 Canadian drought =

Severe drought impacting Canada since 2023

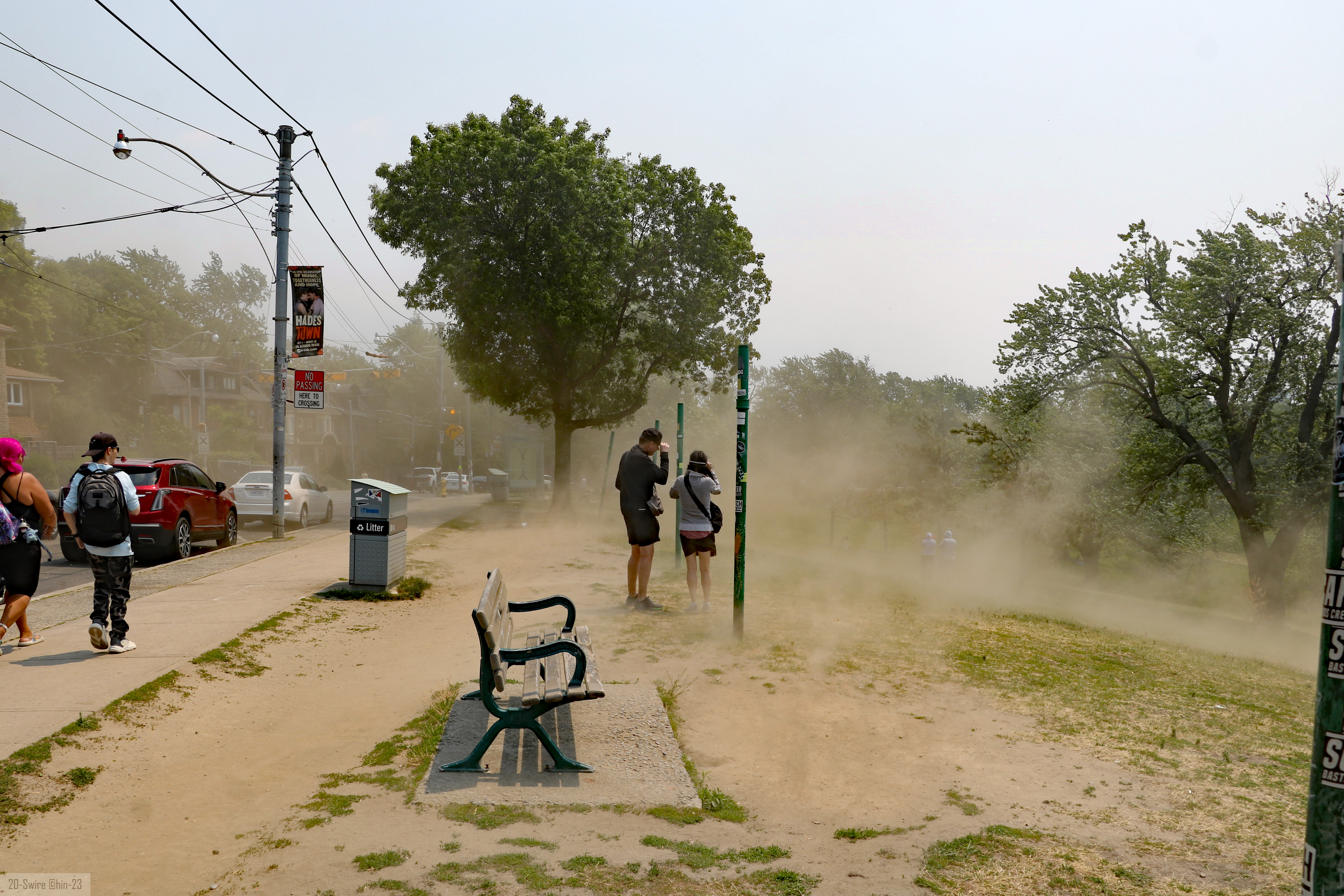
Dust from dry ground, Riverdale Park, Toronto

Since the beginning of March 2023, most of Canada experienced a drought, which was severe across the Prairie provinces and unprecedented in British Columbia. Every province and territory was in drought simultaneously. Common factors across Canada were a quick snow melt, sometimes due to a below-average snowpack, and the warmest May–June period in more than 80 years. Moderate to severe drought conditions from British Columbia to northern Ontario persisted until fall.

The rapid spread of the 2023 Canadian wildfires was exacerbated by the drought. Vegetation throughout Canada was exceptionally dry, leading to tinder-like conditions. Lightning strikes in Canada's west, the most common cause of wildfires in Canada, were not commonly accompanied by any significant rain. Farms in the region which still have access to irrigation also suffered heavy grasshopper infestations.

== Canadian Drought Monitor ==
Agriculture and Agri-Food Canada's Canadian Drought Monitor categorizes droughts in terms of precipitation percentiles on a scale of D0 to D4. D0 refers to an Abnormally Dry event that occurs once in three years; D4 refers to an exceptional drought that occurs once in fifty years. By June 2023, there were areas in Canada experiencing D0 to D3 events. Abnormally Dry lasting based on Drought categories are based on precipitation percentiles that generally related to the statistical return period.

=== Air quality ===
The drought led to a record-breaking number of forest fires across Canada. The combination of wildfire smoke and stagnant air more than tripled the number of air quality warnings issued by Environment Canada in 2023, reaching 3,166 by August 19. At times, Toronto, Montreal, and Calgary each topped the worldwide list of cities with the worst air pollution.

== Atlantic Canada ==
After a low snowfall winter, the spring of 2023 was unusually dry throughout Atlantic Canada, with several regions in moderate drought. Much of PEI received only a quarter of its usual rainfall, while parts of Nova Scotia and New Brunswick saw their driest April on record. In Nova Scotia, irrigation which would not normally be started until July was required in May and early June.

The dry conditions contributed to an unusually high number of wildfires throughout Atlantic Canada. In May and the first week of June, Newfoundland and Labrador experienced more than 10 times its usual number of wildfires. Nova Scotia set an all-time historical record for fires, including four out-of-control fires by June 1st. Two fires ignited near Halifax, including a suburban fire which destroyed an estimated 200 structures.

The drought was broken in mid June by a series of storms, including the remnants of three tropical systems. For much of the Maritimes, the summer of 2023 turned out to be the wettest on record. By the end of September, only the north Labrador shore was still classified as abnormally dry.

== Ontario and Quebec ==
After an unusually low snowfall winter, Ontario and Quebec descended into drought in May, with little or no rainfall through May and the first weeks of June. Quebec's weather in particular swung rapidly between extremes: multiple frosts in south Quebec early in May, with an early extreme heat wave along the Côte-Nord and Abitibi-Témiscamingue. By mid-June, the province was divided between extreme rainfall in the south and extreme heat and drought in the centre and north.

By May 31, nearly all of Ontario and Quebec, with the exception of far western Ontario and Quebec, was under a high to extreme fire risk. By June 8, 54 fires were active in Ontario. The extreme fire risk briefly moved to northwestern Ontario before moving further west.

While most of the fires in central and eastern Ontario were stunted after rain returned in mid-June, the number and size of the Quebec fires quickly grew from 137 fires to 446 fires in just two days. The smoke from the Quebec fires funnelled to Montreal, New York City, and other locations on the Eastern Seaboard. By the night of June 6, New York City had the worst air pollution of any major city in the world; while on the afternoon of June 25, Montreal took that title.

Much of southwestern Ontario was spared the extreme drought which was hitting the rest of Ontario and Quebec. Although southern Ontario began 2023 in drought, the remainder of the winter eased the snow deficit. Rainfall remained mostly normal until an atmospheric Rex block in May, which caused most regions to receive less than 5% of their normal rainfall. A few places recorded their driest May on record. From May 31 to June 11, the region was under an extreme fire risk. However, the drought broke in mid-June, with close to normal rainfall and only moderate heat thereafter. Because crops were planted in April's moisture, the drought during May did not affect crop yields in regions south of Muskoka. The exception was a yield drag on winter wheat, which begins to ripen in early summer.

However, southwestern Ontario was not immune from wildfire smoke. When the wind came from the northeast, smoke funnelled into the area from the Outaouais fires. This caused a few extremely poor air quality days, including June 28, when Toronto topped the worldwide charts for worst air quality. The smoke did not affect crop quality, although many farm workers wore N95 masks while working outside.

== Prairie Region ==
June 2023 marked the point where all eastern droughts abated and the western ones became significantly worse.

Although most of Alberta and Saskatchewan have been in moderate drought since 2020, recent drought conditions have been severe. In May 2023, Some locations in the Prairie region—which includes Alberta, Saskatchewan, and Manitoba—reached temperatures that were 7 degrees above normal while average temperatures were reported at 3 to 5 degrees above normal temperatures.

The first D3 Extreme Drought designation in 2023 in Canada was reported in Alberta. By the end of June because of ongoing and extreme drought conditions, Paintearth, Stettler, Vulcan, and Foothills declared states of Municipal Agricultural Disaster.

Near-historic low water levels on the Churchill, Winnipeg, and Saskatchewan Rivers sharply reduced the power available from several key hydroelectric generating stations. To compensate, Manitoba Hydro pulled its Brandon natural gas facility into service months ahead of its usual deep winter deployment. Only the Lake Winnipeg reservoir, which is refilled annually by the Red River flood, continued to operate near the middle of its range.

Extreme to exceptional drought in the entire region south of Calgary continued into the fall. Areas from Fort McMurray north to the Northwest Territories were still in severe to extreme drought at the end of September. Only central Alberta, in a wide circle centring on Edmonton, was free of drought by fall.

== British Columbia ==
Every part of the entire province of British Columbia, including the coastal temperate rain forest and Haida Gwaii, has been in drought throughout the summer months of 2023. Two-thirds of BC's water basins were in extreme to exceptional drought, with the hardest-hit areas being across the south and in the northeast Peace River region. Tofino saw only a quarter of its usual rainfall between July and Oct 21; Vancouver had less than 10% of its usual rainfall; and Victoria, British Columbia recorded only 2 millimetres of rain instead of its normal average of 132 mm. In Prince George, British Columbia, the confluence of the Fraser and Nechako Rivers had nearly run dry.

The provincial government first announced impending drought on June 23, when several major watersheds were already at drought level 3 and the Peace River region had hit drought level 4. At that time and throughout the drought, it only asked for voluntary water restrictions. It did not invoke the 2016 Water Sustainability Act or make use of the 2021 Healthy Watersheds Initiative. Consequently, virtually all emergency measures were implemented at civic or regional levels.

Prior to 2022, the Sunshine Coast in BC's rain forest had only experienced stage 4 water restrictions four times. In 2022, stage 4 water restrictions were imposed for three months. In 2023, stage 4 restrictions were imposed in July and continued into the fall. A state of emergency was declared in the Sunshine Coast after the main reservoir had fallen to critically low levels, with non-essential heavy water-using industries such as concrete installers no longer allowed to use potable water.

Agriculture in microregions, which still had access to irrigation, suffered major pest incursions from creatures seeking water and substantive nourishment. Grasshopper invasions decimated crops throughout southwest BC. After several summers of drought, a quarter of the trees in Vancouver's Stanley Park have died, the highest rate of mortality in the park's history. Extremely low water levels in Vancouver Island rivers have been implicated in early salmon die-off during spawning runs.

Despite the low rainfall, Tofino's reservoir on Meares Island has remained at healthy levels. It is replenished by moss which absorbs moisture directly from fog and dew and which itself requires the protection of first-growth forests. Meares Island retained its first-growth forests after the Nuu-chah-nulth First Nation and Friends of Clayoquot Sound successfully stopped clear cutting during the Clayoquot protests. Tofino had expanded the reservoir and imposed water metering on several big resorts after the drought of 2006, which was not as severe as the 2023 drought.

Extreme drought continued until the fall on Vancouver Island, along the coast, and in the Interior Plateau. The first atmospheric river of fall 2023 hit BC's coastal regions with up to 200 mm of rain, but this still fell far short of the rainfall deficit for the region. Some parts of the southern Interior received up to 50 mm of rain, but most remained relatively dry because of the rain shadow effect.

== See also ==
- 2023 Canadian wildfires
- Climate change in Canada
