= Judge Thompson =

Judge Thompson may refer to:

- Albert C. Thompson (1842–1910), judge of the United States District Court for the Southern District of Ohio
- Alvin W. Thompson (born 1953), judge of the United States District Court for the District of Connecticut
- Anne Elise Thompson (born 1934), judge of the United States District Court for the District of New Jersey
- Bruce Rutherford Thompson (1911–1992), judge of the United States District Court for the District of Nevada
- David R. Thompson (1930–2011), judge of the United States Court of Appeals for the Ninth Circuit
- Gordon Thompson Jr. (1929–2015), judge of the United States District Court for the Southern District of California
- Joseph Whitaker Thompson (1861–1946), judge of the United States Court of Appeals for the Third Circuit
- Myron H. Thompson (born 1947), judge of the United States District Court for the Middle District of Alabama
- O. Rogeriee Thompson (born 1951), judge of the United States Court of Appeals for the First Circuit
- Ralph Gordon Thompson (born 1934), judge of the United States District Court for the Western District of Oklahoma
- Roby C. Thompson (1898–1960), judge of the United States District Court for the Western District of Virginia
- Trina Thompson (born 1961), judge of the United States District Court for the Northern District of California

== See also ==
- R. Ewing Thomason (1879–1973), judge of the United States District Court for the Western District of Texas
- Roszel Cathcart Thomsen (1900–1992), judge of the United States District Court for the District of Maryland
- W. H. Seward Thomson (1856–1932), judge of the United States District Court for the Western District of Pennsylvania
- Justice Thompson (disambiguation)
