= Clayoquot protests =

1980–1994 anti-logging protests in British Columbia, Canada

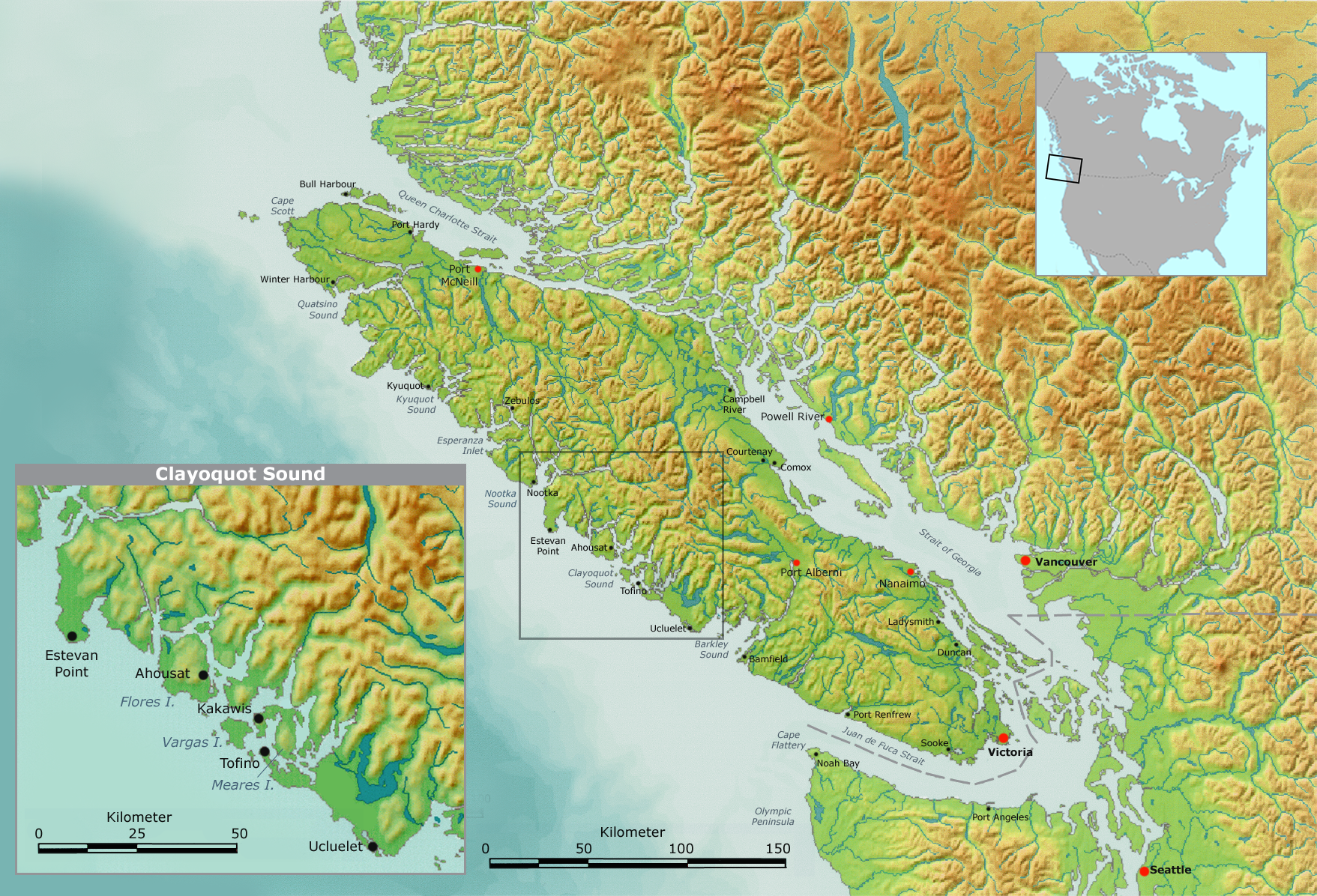
Map of Vancouver Island with inset of Clayoquot Sound region

The Clayoquot protests, also called the War in the Woods, were a series of blockades related to clearcutting in Clayoquot Sound, British Columbia. They culminated in mid-1993, when 856 people were arrested. The blockades in the summer of 1993 against logging of the temperate rainforest were the largest act of civil disobedience in Canadian history until the 2021 Fairy Creek blockades.

The timber resources of Clayoquot Sound were attracting foreigners, stifling indigenous peoples's access to land and creating displeasure among locals. In the 1980s and the 1990s, government support of private company resource extraction allowed the industry to grow over time and resulted in the presence of logging companies in Clayoquot Sound The differing opinions between those groups led the First Nations to develop lobbying organizations and a series of negotiations over logging practices. In the late 1980s, the situation escalated when the Canadian forestry company MacMillan Bloedel secured a permit to log Meares Island.

From 1980 to 1994, several peaceful protests and blockades of logging roads occurred, with the largest in the mid-1993, when over 800 protesters were arrested and many put on trial. Protesters included local residents of the Sound, the Tla-o-qui-aht First Nation and Ahousaht First Nation, and environmentalist groups such as Greenpeace and Friends of Clayoquot Sound.

The logging protests and blockades received worldwide mass media attention, creating national support for the environmental movement in British Columbia and fostering strong advocacy for anti-logging campaigns. Media focused on the mass arrests of people engaging in peaceful protests and blockades, aggression, and intimidation from law enforcement, which served to strengthen public support for nonviolent protests.

== Background ==
The region had been populated by Indigenous communities for millennia before the arrival of colonial European explorers in the 18th century. In 1774, the first European to arrive in Tofino was Spaniard Juan José Pérez Hernández. Hernández and his crew recognized the potential wealth of the region's resources, such as fish and timber. Afterwards, several trading posts were erected and operated for a little over a century. In 1899, the first Catholic mission was built. Over time, the region's prosperity fluctuated similarly to many other frontier settlements, due to difficulty accessing the region from a lack of roads. In 1959, a logging road was built to Tofino, marking the beginning of the region's commercial exploitation of resources. This allowed the fishing industry to take off and by 1964, four hundred boats were tied up at the Tofino Harbor at once.

On May 4, 1971, an official dedication ceremony created Pacific Rim National Park in Clayoquot Sound. As a result, the originally unpaved logging road built in 1959 was paved in order to access Tofino. However this paving process started earlier on, as "Paving started in the late 1960s and was completed by 1972." Prior to this, logging companies had been investing into the region and with easier access, natural resources could now be exploited on a larger scale. As timber supply in the small operations in the Kennedy Lake and Ucluelet area began to diminish the logging companies' presence near Tofino increased. The new Pacific Rim National Park "was located within unceded Nuu-chah-nulth territory and went around reserve lands, thus denying those First Nations access to resources therein."

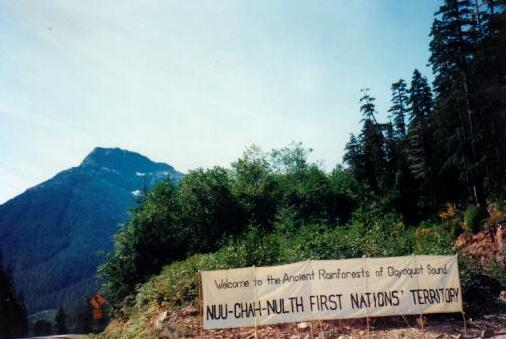
Nuu-chah-nulth logging road blockade site

Beginning in the 1980s, what was considered 'unrestricted logging' provoked significant public protests. It began when MacMillan Bloedel announced to begin logging on Meares Island. Leaders of the Nuu-chah-nulth tribe rejected this proposal.

=== History of Indigenous Peoples in the Region ===
The Clayoquot Sound is believed to have been continuously populated by First Nations peoples for over 5,000 years according to carbon dating of discarded clamshells. Currently, the Clayoquot Sound is inhabited by three First Nations: the Ahousaht, Hesquiaht, and the Tla-o-qui-aht. These three tribes are part of the Central Region of the Nuu-chah-nulth Nations, and they share many common ancestral themes such as reliance on cedar, salmon, and whales. For Nuu-chah-nulth people, cedar serves as a vital source of heat and light, as well as being a key material in the production of "woven mats, clothing, utensils, longhouses, paddles and canoes." In addition, Cedar trees play a significant spiritual role in the life of the Nuu-chah-nulth.

=== Ecology and Wildlife of the Clayoquot Sound ===
The Clayoquot biosphere includes a diverse array of ecosystems such as temperate coastal rainforests, rocky coastal shores, and some of the only remaining old-growth forests remaining in British Columbia. About 85% of the land in the region is considered temperate rainforest. The Clayoquot rainforests are predominantly made up of Western Hemlock, Western Red Cedar, Amabilis Fir, Western Yellow Cedar, Sitka Spruce, Pine, Douglas Fir, Yew and Red Alder. The region is home to over 300 vertebrate species such as black bears, cougars, minks, and grey wolves. In addition, endangered and threatened species such as orcas, sea otters, and auklets call the Clayoquot Sound home. According to the Institute for Coastal and Oceans Research at the University of Victoria, British Columbia, "The diversity of the terrain and habitat means that this area can support a denser population of many of these species than would exist in a mono-culture of coniferous forest."

== Blockades and protests ==
In 1984, the first opposition to logging companies in the Sound occurred, when members of Friends of Clayoquot Sound and First Nations groups set up blockades on the logging roads leading to Meares Island. The island was important to First Nations communities because it contained main sources of drinking water for the area. On Meares Island, "drinking water is sourced from reservoirs that receive an abundance of rain water filtered through the surrounding watershed." Then, the water is treated, stored, and delivered to the residents and businesses of Tofino.

Environmental groups like Friends of Clayoquot Sound and the First Nations communities were concerned with the logging companies' approach to resource management. The First Nations did not completely oppose all logging in the Sound; in fact, they acknowledged that their people had depended on the land's resources for centuries. Rather, they opposed the fact that the companies were pursuing short-term profits by extracting resources at maximum efficiency rates, with little interference from the British Columbia government.

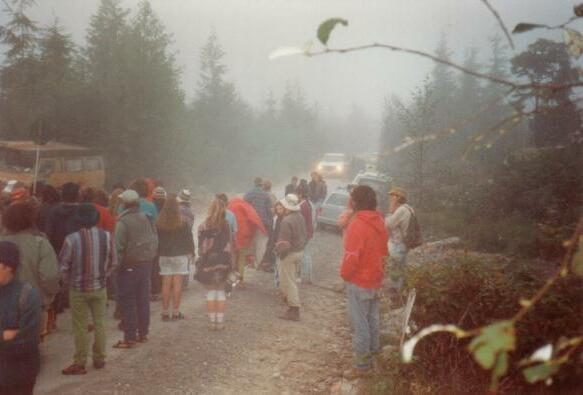
Protestors blocking the logging road

When Macmillan-Bloedel workers arrived at Meares Island in 1984, they encountered a bigger blockade that included members of the Nuu-chah-nulth tribe, local environmental groups, and other supporters of their cause. To prevent logging operations from continuing, protesters declared the island a Tribal Park. Joe Martin, a Clayoquot band council member said of this protest: "It's the first time the whites and natives have gotten together on anything that's worthwhile." MacMillan Bloedel attempted to override this action with a court injunction, succeeding in their aims. However, in 1985 the Ahousaht and Tla-o-qui-aht First Nations acquired their own injunction to halt logging on the island, at least until the Nuu-chah-nulth's concerns had been addressed in the form of a treaty. This consequential 1985 injunction was granted in a 3 to 2 decision by a British Columbia Appeals Court. In the decision, Justice Peter D. Seaton stated, "It has...been suggested that a decision favourable to the Indians will cast a huge doubt on the tenure that is the basis for the huge investment that has been made and is being made. There is a problem about tenure that has not been attended to in the past. We are being asked to ignore the problem as [the province of British Columbia has] ignored it. I am not willing to do that." Justice MacFarlane echoed this sentiment and went even further, arguing for increased treaty deliberations: "The fact that there is an issue between the Indians and the province based on Aboriginal claims should not come as a surprise to anyone. Those claims have been advanced by the Indians for many years. They were advanced in [the Calder case] and half the court thought they had some substance... I think it is fair to say that, in the end, the public anticipates that the claims will be resolved by negotiations and by settlement. This judicial proceeding is but a small part of the whole process which will ultimately find its solutions in a reasonable exchange between governments and the Indian nations."

Throughout the 1980s animosity continued between these groups due to each side's respective injunctions, which were in contradiction with one another over the use of the land.

In 1992, Friends of Clayoquot Sound set up another blockade. In mid-1993, the most significant protests occurred. Introduction of the Clayoquot Sound Land Use Plan by Mike Harcourt's New Democratic government – which had campaigned on protections for Clayoquot and BC old-growth forests – sparked outrage among environmentalists and the Nuu-chah-nulth people alike. Environmental groups debated the amount and type of land that had been divided, but the First Nations, who composed almost the entire population of the Sound, were concerned that the plan did not consider their spatial, environmental, or economic practices.

In March 1993, initially-peaceful protesters gathered on the lawn of the BC Legislature in Victoria, calling on the NDP government not to allow clearcut logging in Clayoquot Sound. When the assembled officials entered the legislature and attempted to close the doors, however, protesters forced their way in; in the process, an elderly security guard was knocked down and injured his hip. The protesters then swarmed into the foyer chanting slogans, and attempted to force open the inner doors separating the foyer from the Chamber, pounding on the doors and walls and chanting slogans, leading to the breakage of an historic stained glass window. Staff and MLAs successfully barricaded the doors. Victoria Police Department officers eventually arrived and cleared the protesters out; as the protest dispersed, organizers passed the hat to gather donations to cover repair of the broken window.

During the mid-1993, nearly 11,000 people came to Clayoquot Sound to take part in the protests. Activists eventually gained the support of major organizations such as Greenpeace and the Sierra Club. In addition, "Tofino doctors, lawyers, business owners and town councillors joined forces with Nuu-chah-nulth leaders and nature-loving drifters like a Greenpeace campaigner known as 'Seattle Steve.' Money and legal aid started flowing in. So did supporters from Haida Gwaii and California, and media from all over the country." Every day for three months, protesters would gather and blockade a remote logging road, preventing vehicles carrying workers from reaching their sites. The Royal Canadian Mounted Police would then read a court injunction and carry or drag protesters into a bus, which would transport them to the police station in Ucluelet to be charged and released. By the middle of the year, the sheer number of people that had been arrested made it one of the largest acts of civil disobedience in Canadian history.

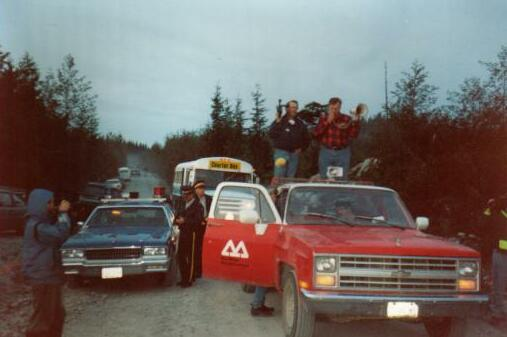
The court injunction being read to protesters, August 1993

Many residents of Tofino and Ucluelet worked in the logging industry and felt that the 1993 protests threatened their livelihood. In response, they organized a counter-protest called the "Ucluelet Rendezvous '93." More than 5,000 people came to support the workers and logging community, culminating in 200 litres (44 imp gal; 53 US gal) of human excrement being poured near the environmentalists' information site. Loggers stated that they did not want to wipe out the forests, but that carrying on the industry was economically important for future generations.

=== Media and protest attention ===
Through local, national, and international news coverage, the demonstrations in the Clayoquot Sound became recognized by the public as having the potential to make significant changes to environmental policy. The logging protests and blockades received worldwide mass media attention, creating national support for environmental movements facing British Columbia and fostering a strong advocacy for anti-logging campaigns.

Mass media attention began by relaying highly controversial, and at times, violent coverage of the protest events, showcasing dramatic outcomes that would lead to higher viewing and readership rates. Reporters believed that this sort of coverage was necessary to bring attention to the cause (given the outcome of certain protests) and offered more appeal to a public that sought entertainment value in the media. Women were portrayed more often than men as being 'radical activists' and members of extremist groups, which encouraged the formation of social stigmas being attached to female protesters. The media's creation of stereotypes led to controversy surrounding the potential economic benefits for media outlets publishing sensational news. Accusations began to surround the mass media's use of language as being biased and one-sided when referring to relevant multi-stakeholder groups.

Over time, the media began to detract attention from 'radical activists' towards reports on individuals who were indirectly involved in the protests. The opinions of 'mild activists' were covered more frequently over time due to their moderation. Considering the ongoing nature of the protests, a shift was made in the media in hopes of resolving the underlying issues surrounding Clayoquot Sound. News articles began to steer reports away from extremists who, in the past, were the focus of dramatic and uniquely portrayed events. Reporters indicated that they chose to interview more moderate groups and 'mild activists' because they were believed to offer more credible and sensible information. The drive to produce more reliable information surpassed the media's need to provide entertainment, which encouraged the public to understand the seriousness behind the issue taking place.

Media attention began to focus on the perceived unfairness of the mass arrests after individuals joined in peaceful protests and blockades, violating a court injunction that forbid the occurrence of such events. News sources focused on activists as having encountered on-site aggression and intimidation, which eventually helped strengthen public support for non-violent actions. Eventually the media did not emphasize the significance of any few particular environmental leaders as central actors in the protection of Clayoquot Sound. Instead, protesters, environmental NGOs and local First Nations were portrayed together as being deeply committed to the effort of preserving Clayoquot Sound, becoming a symbol for international environmental efforts and awareness. These lobby groups, advocating for the boycott of large-scale logging corporations, successfully urged the public to join in and support the cause as activists themselves.

== Land Use Deliberations ==
These protests posed difficulties for locals who worked in the lumber industry. The blockades prevented these workers from completing their jobs, which meant they would not be paid. In 1988, the Tin Wis Coalition was created allowing workers, environmentalists, and aboriginals to discuss mutually beneficial changes. In October 1990 the coalition ceased shortly after a conference.

In 1989 a new forum of eleven-members formed, which meant to produce more results and resolutions by finding compromises for land use in Clayoquot Sound to satisfy all stakeholders. It was formed by the Social Credit government in BC, but in October 1989 it disbanded similarly to the prior coalition.

In 1990, the Clayoquot Sound Development Steering Committee, with representatives from the logging industry, environmentalists, tourist operators, and First Nations groups formed and talked for over a year and a half until environmentalists and tourism representatives walked out, unimpressed that logging operations had continued while the groups met, and disbanded in May 1991.

The government and a separate panel of Ministry of Environment and Ministry of Forests representatives met to decide where logging could and could not occur, while the Steering Committee was gathering. In May 1991 environmentalists left for the second time failed to reach an agreement. In 1991, the British Columbia New Democratic Party (NDP) took up government and utilized all the information compiled from both the committee and the task force to create their Clayoquot Sound Land Use Plan, which they announced in 1993. The plan divided the forests of Clayoquot Sound into numerous regions, setting parts aside for preservation, logging, and other various activities including recreation, wildlife, and scenery. The plan permitted logging in two-thirds of the old growth forest in Clayoquot.

== Trials ==
In August 1994, a British Columbia Provincial Court began the trials of the protestors, with B.C. Supreme Court Justice John Bouck overseeing the first round of prosecutions. Numerous people from a variety of backgrounds and ages were arrested daily for participating in the protests, and charged with criminal contempt of court for defying an injunction banning demonstrations on company work sites. The injunction was obtained by Macmillan Bloedel Ltd.'s logging operations at the Kennedy Lake Bridge, near Clayoquot Sound, stating that no public interference was to be allowed in the areas they were logging. Of the 932 people arrested, 860 were prosecuted in eight trials. All those prosecuted for criminal intent were found guilty.

The sentences for guilty verdicts varied greatly, with punishments dependent on an individual's involvement in the protest, as well is if they had previously accumulated a criminal record. The sentenced parties faced penalties such as fines, probation and jail sentences. The jail terms ranged from a suspended sentence, all the way up to six months in jail, while fines ranged from $250 to $3,000. The judges included Justices Bouck, Low, Murphy, Drake, and Oliver. The lightest sentences were given out by Justice Drake in December, where he gave those found guilty no jail time and $250 fines. The first 44 people to be put on trial in front of John Bouck received jail time ranging from 45 to 60 days, and fines of $1,000 to $3,000. Justice Low judged the second group with penalties of 21 days in jail or home arrest with a security bracelet for electric monitoring during probation, in some cases allowing a choice between home arrest or jail. Many who had the choice decided to do their sentences in jail as an added protest to the issue.

== Boycotts and Corporate Pressure ==
The intact forests that stand in Clayoquot Sound today represent the outcome of numerous protests that occurred at the end of the 20th Century, having established a solid protection plan for forests. Greenpeace played a significant role in these protests, instigating a boycott of BC forest products in order to apply pressure on the industry. The boycott was called off once the scientific panel's recommendations were accepted by the government, deferring logging until an inventory of pristine areas was completed. The Annual Allowable Cut and clear-cuts in the area were reduced to a maximum of four hectares. In addition, Eco-Based Planning was to occur once biological and cultural inventories were completed.

As the protests had a negative impact on the reputation and sales of large-scale logging companies in Clayoquot Sound, they removed their operations from the area, and First Nations residents in the Sound were then able to purchase 50% of ownership in the region's logging rights. Iisaak Forest Resources Ltd. formed on behalf of the First Nations, allowing them to take charge over logging operations with their private company. In 1993 environmental lawyer Robert Kennedy Jr. had suggested that aboriginal people should be given full control of forest resources.

During the summer of 1993, more than 30 famous Canadians spoke out against clear-cutting as a result of the protests. Powerful individuals such as Tom Cruise, Barbra Streisand, Oliver Stone, and Robert Redford were part of this group. One of Canada's largest publishers, Knopf Canada, as well as some German publishers also announced support for clear-cut-free paper. In addition, organizations in the United States sent out mass mailings to the country's largest media sources to encourage an end to business relations with MacMillan Bloedel. From 1993 to 1995, the logging giant lost $200 million in contracts related to the sale of timber products. The massive financial strain on one of Canada's largest natural resource providers forced both MacMillan Bloedel and the government to the bargaining table with representatives of the Nuu-chah-nulth First Nations. After these deliberations, "Macmillan-Bloedel gradually extricated itself from Clayoquot Sound and turned over control of the tree farm licence to the Nuu-chah-nulth First Nations."

== Aftermath ==
In July 1995, the first significant change in government policies occurred, when all 127 unanimous recommendations made by the scientific panel on Clayoquot Sound were accepted by the Forests Minister of British Columbia, Andrew Petter, and the Environment Minister, Elizabeth Cull on behalf of the NDP government. In 1996, the provincial government financed the compromise, extending $9.3 million over three years to MacMillan Bloedel "to log the territory in an ecologically sound way". In 1999, Iisaak Forest Resources Ltd. signed an agreement known as a Memorandum of Understanding (MOU), ensuring that logging would not occur outside areas which had obviously been logged before and which were outside the intact ancient forests of Clayoquot Sound. The MOU set aside most of the Clayoquot on the western portion of Vancouver Island. Upon passage of the deal, MacMillan Bloedel stated that they would "not log in any of the region's unlogged valleys that are larger than 1,000 hectares."

In 2000, the entire Sound was designated as a Biosphere Reserve by UNESCO, further emphasizing its ecological importance; however, this was not legally binding in preventing companies from logging in the future. The designation created world recognition of Clayoquot Sound's biological diversity, and a $12M monetary fund to "support research, education and training in the Biosphere region". At the end of July 2006, a new set of Watershed Plans was approved in Clayoquot Sound, opening the door for logging to proceed a further 90,000 hectares in the forest, including pristine old-growth valleys As of 2007, both logging tenures within Clayoquot Sound are controlled by first nation logging companies. Iisaak Forest Resources controls Timber Forest License (TFL) 57 in Clayoquot Sound. MaMook Natural Resources Ltd, in conjunction with Coulson Forest Products, manages TFL54 in Clayoquot Sound.

In 2013, the War in the Woods was said to have set the stage for the protests around the two big pipeline proposals in BC. On April 20, 2014, Tla-o-qui-aht First Nation commemorated 30 years since the beginning of the Clayoquot Protests in an event at Tofino Community Hall. The event saw members of the Tribal community engage in traditional song and dance while also celebrating the successful attempts at opposing logging on Meares Island Tribal Park.

Since the establishment of Meares Island Tribal Park in 2014, the use of Tribal Parks to maintain Indigenous sovereignty has increased in Canada. In advocating for the expansion of Tribal Parks on formerly held indigenous land, Indigenous Canadians seek to return to traditional methods of conservation and resource management. At Tla-o-qui-aht Tribal Parks, "First Nations staff harvest only the bark of trees for uses including housing, firewood, and medicinal purposes and swim in the rivers to count fish, ensuring the health of the population."

The CBC television series the “Nature of Things” on March 16, 2023, aired the documentary film War For the Woods following host and narrator David Suzuki and Stephanie Kwetásel’wet Wood, a Sḵwx̱wú7mesh journalist from The Narwhal journey exploring the thirty years since the summer of 1993 Clayoquot Protests. Wood's traveled to Tla-o-qui-aht territory and other central Nuu-Chah-Nulth nations seeking to understand the loss of old-growth forests and Indigenous-led efforts to protect B.C.'s old-growth forests. The documentary was written and co-directed by Toronto-based filmmakers Sean Stiller who also directed the 2021 film Returning Home and Geoff Morrison.

=== 2023 drought ===
During the 2023 Canadian drought, Tofino's reservoir on Meares Island remained at healthy levels despite only receiving a quarter of its usual rainfall. Tofino had expanded the reservoir and imposed water metering on several big resorts after the drought of 2006, which was not as severe as the 2023 drought. The reservoir is replenished by moss which absorbs moisture directly from fog and dew and which itself requires the protection of first-growth forests. The Fraser and Nechako River experienced droughts.
