= Justice Thompson =

Justice Thompson may refer to:

- Smith Thompson (1768–1843), associate justice of the United States Supreme Court
- Charles H. Thompson (Illinois judge) (1882–1972), chief justice of the Illinois Supreme Court
- David N. Thompson (1859–1945), associate justice of the Louisiana Supreme Court
- Floyd Thompson (lawyer) (1887–1960), associate justice of the Supreme Court of Illinois
- Frank D. Thompson (1876–1940), associate justice of the Vermont Supreme Court
- G. King Thompson (1887–1979), associate justice of the Iowa Supreme Court
- Gordon R. Thompson (1918–1995), associate justice of the Supreme Court of Nevada
- Hugh P. Thompson (born 1943), chief justice of the Georgia Supreme Court
- Ira F. Thompson (1885–1937), associate justice of the Supreme Court of California
- James Thompson (jurist) (1806–1874), associate justice of the Supreme Court of Pennsylvania
- John C. Thompson (1790–1831), associate justice of the Vermont Supreme Court
- John Thompson (Louisiana judge) (died 1810), judge of the Superior Court of the Territory of Orleans
- Laforrest H. Thompson (1848–1900), associate justice of the Vermont Supreme Court
- Leslie A. Thompson (1806–1874), associate justice of the Florida Supreme Court
- Lucas P. Thompson (1797–1866), associate justice of the Supreme Court of Appeals of Virginia
- William Carrington Thompson (1915–2011), associate justice of the Supreme Court of Appeals of Virginia
- William George Thompson (1830–1911), associate justice of the Idaho Supreme Court
- William H. Thompson (Nebraska politician) (1853–1937), associate justice of the Nebraska Supreme Court

== See also ==
- Judge Thompson (disambiguation)
