= 1983–1985 North American drought =

Weather event in the United States and Canada

An extreme drought that was accompanied by several intense heat waves across several portions of the United States and southern Canada developed during mid-spring 1983 and extended through to Autumn 1985.

== Overview ==
The United States Drought of 1983 may have started in April. The drought involved numerous states in the Midwest and the Great Plains. As well, many states experienced a heat wave in the summer months, with temperatures over 100 °F (38 °C) or higher in multiple areas. Later in 1983 and the two following years, dry conditions began affecting south-central Canada as well, particularly Alberta, Manitoba and Saskatchewan. The drought may have been caused under a weak-to-moderate La Niña which might have developed during mid-spring of 1983.

== Midwestern States ==
Almost all the counties in the State of Indiana and many in Illinois were given a drought disaster declaration because of dangerous heat spells, along with extremely dry conditions. In Kentucky, the Drought of 1983 was second to worst in the 20th century. Numerous trees and shrubs went into dormancy.

== Northeastern States ==
Dry conditions also affected parts of the Middle Atlantic between 1983 and 1985. The drought, especially in 1983 – 1985, affected Pennsylvania, Maryland, New Jersey, parts of New England and eastern New York State.

== Canada ==
In parts of south-central Canada between spring 1983 to early Autumn 1985, drought led to substandard crops, primarily in Alberta, Manitoba and several regions of Saskatchewan. Though June was somewhat wet for these areas, July was almost exactly the opposite, as was August, Autumn and the following two years.

== Related heat wave ==
Excessive heat waves affected numerous portions of the United States from Spring 1983 to mid-Autumn 1985. Missouri, Illinois and Kentucky were pummeled by severe heat which killed several hundred people. The heat and dryness also went across the Southeastern and Mid Atlantic areas, including New York City. Other affected states were Nebraska, Iowa, Wisconsin, Minnesota and Kansas.
