= Jeffrey Jones (footballer) =

Welsh footballer

Personal information
- Full name: Jeffrey Woodward Jones
- Date of birth: 27 February 1886
- Place of birth: Llandrindod Wells, Radnorshire Wales
- Date of death: 29 February 1976
- Place of death: Bridgend Glamorgan Wales

International career
Years	Team	Apps	(Gls)
1969–1910	Wales	3	(0)

Jeffrey Woodward Jones (27 February 1886 – 29 February 1976) was a Welsh international footballer. He was part of the Wales national football team between 1908 and 1910, playing 3 matches. He played his first match on 11 April 1908 against Ireland and his last match on 5 March 1910 against Scotland.

== See also ==
- List of Wales international footballers (alphabetical)
