= 1934–35 North American drought =

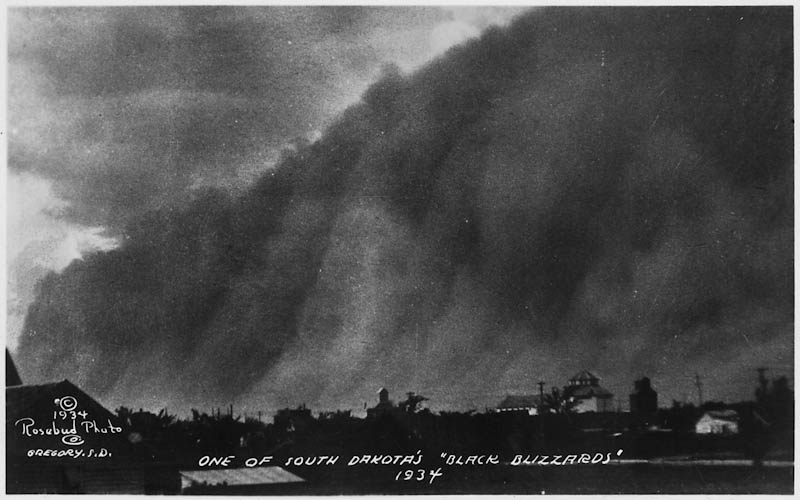
Approaching dust storm in South Dakota in 1934

Excessive heat and drought problems affected the United States in 1934–35 from the Rocky Mountains, Texas and Oklahoma to parts of the Midwestern, Great Lakes, and Mid-Atlantic states. These droughts and excessive heat spells were parts of the Dust Bowl and concurrent with the Great Depression in the United States.

A number of U.S. states experienced new records in both heat and dryness, including (in order) Arkansas, Colorado, Illinois, Iowa, Kansas, Kentucky, Louisiana, Missouri, Nebraska, New Mexico, Ohio, Texas, Utah, Wisconsin, and Wyoming. The drought had similar effects on the Mid-Atlantic states and the southern regions of New England. The affected areas had actually experienced insufficient rainfall from 1930 until 1941, explaining in part the lack of water. The death toll of the drought and the associated heat waves is estimated to between 6,000 and 10,000 people.

== Overview ==
Multiple U.S. states set heat and dryness records in many regions; these included Illinois, Missouri, Iowa, Kansas, Arkansas, Kentucky, Wisconsin, Ohio, Colorado, Wyoming, New Mexico, Utah, Texas, Nebraska, and Louisiana. The conditions not only negatively affected the Great Plains, Midwest or Great Lakes areas, they did likewise across the Mid-Atlantic States (Maryland, Virginia, West Virginia, Delaware, New York State, Pennsylvania, New Jersey) and into several southern New England States.

There were also dust storms in 1934 and 1935 in the southern Great Plains, the Midwest, Great Lakes States and even the East Coast of the U.S.

Many studies indicate that the drought spells might have been caused when tractors and farm machinery were introduced the previous decade. Furthermore, not enough rain fell over the areas in question in the period between 1930 and 1941, one of those periods being 1934–35.

According to numerous studies, the 1934–35 droughts and heat might have certainly been the worst such events in the 20th century at that particular time. Several states, however, were worse affected when the 1936 North American heat waves and drought spells developed that year and reset records across those areas.

The drought might have covered between 70% and 86% percent of North America according to research studies, multiples of which set the coverage closer to the latter.

The death toll under the drought and heat waves was from six to almost ten thousand.
