= Midwest City (group) =

American musical group

- Origin: Oklahoma City, Oklahoma, United States
- Genres: R&B
- Years active: 2005–present
- Labels: Spencow/Universal Motown
- Members: Solomon; Tone; Shamale; Shay
- Website: midwestcity-music.com

Midwest City is an R&B group signed to Universal/Motown. The group is composed of two sets of brothers, all born in Oklahoma City, Oklahoma. They began as gospel a cappella singers before transitioning into R&B. Their names are Shay, Tone, Solo, and Melle.

== History ==
They are currently recording their debut album to be released at the fall of 2008. The album, Authentic R&B, was originally scheduled for release in early 2007, however it was pushed back several times for unknown reasons. Their first single, "One Love", appeared in May 2006, peaking at #37 on Billboard's Hot Adult R&B Airplay chart.

A song called "Hey Ma" which features Flo Rida was leaked onto the internet on August 23, 2008.

== Discography ==
=== Singles ===
- 2006: "One Love"
