= Geoff Jones (footballer, born 1944) =

Australian rules footballer

Personal information
- Full name: Geoff Jones
- Born: 4 November 1944 (age 81)
- Original team: Lang Lang
- Height: 173 cm (5 ft 8 in)
- Weight: 71 kg (157 lb)

Playing career^{1}
Years	Club	Games (Goals)
1965	North Melbourne	3 (0)
- ^{1} Playing statistics correct to the end of 1965.

Geoff Jones (born 4 November 1944) is a former Australian rules footballer who played with North Melbourne in the Victorian Football League (VFL).
