= Friends of Clayoquot Sound =

Friends of Clayoquot Sound is a Canadian grassroots non-profit environmental organization, based in Tofino, British Columbia. It focuses on protecting Clayoquot Sound's globally rare ecosystem of temperate rainforest and ocean (designated a UNESCO Biosphere Reserve), and on building a local, conservation-based economy.

== History ==
=== Origins ===
Friends of Clayoquot Sound (FOCS) was established in Tofino in 1979, focusing on the logging activity on nearby Meares Island. The small group of activists then set their sights on protecting Clayoquot Sound's ancient temperate rainforest as a globally rare ecosystem (as recognized by the UNESCO). Pursuing both environmental and culture change goals, FOCS advocated for a transition to an environmentally friendly economy and society. In 1984 FOCS and Tla-o-qui-aht First Nations led one of the first logging blockades in Canada to prevent logging on Meares Island. The logging company held the rights to clear cut 90% of the island at this time. As a result, Meares Island was declared a Tribal Park by Tla-o-qui-aht First Nations and the island remains unlogged to this day .

Friends of Clayoquot Sound then led blockades in 1988 and 1992, respectively, stopping an illegal logging road in Sulphur Pass, and protesting against MacMillan Bloedel's logging on the edge of intact Clayoquot River valley. In 1993, in response to British Columbia's decision to allow logging in most of Clayoquot Sound's ancient forests, FOCS organized the largest peaceful civil disobedience protest in Canadian history, in collaboration with other environmental groups such as Greenpeace. Over 12,000 people attended the "Clayoquot Summer" blockade, and 856 were arrested and charged. A Peace Camp in the "Black Hole" clear-cut, and daily blockades and arrests on a logging road near Kennedy Lake (Kennedy River Bridge) took place during the so-called "war in the woods". The blockade brought Clayoquot Sound and the issue of temperate rainforest destruction to world attention.

=== Recent developments ===
In 1997, Friends of Clayoquot Sound started a "fish farm campaign," aimed at reforming the open- net-cage salmon feedlot cultivation that occurs in the inlets of Clayoquot Sound. Two years later, FOCS helped negotiate a Memorandum of Understanding (MOU) between environmental groups and a logging company to protect some of Clayoquot Sound's intact valleys. The agreement was not legally binding, and called for the environment groups to support the continued cutting of Clayoquot's ancient rainforests outside of the intact valleys. For this reason, FOCS did not sign the MOU. In 2006, Friends of Clayoquot Sound joined the coalition that signed the 1999 MOU. This coalition was formalized in 2010 as the Clayoquot Sound Conservation Alliance (CSCA). As part of the CSCA, FOCS works to achieve permanent legal protection for Clayoquot's intact valleys, while securing conservation financing to assist local First Nations to develop a conservation economy.

== Methods ==
From the beginning, public education campaigns, from local to international, have been a key tool of Friends of Clayoquot Sound. By disseminating information about environmental issues facing Clayoquot, FOCS creates awareness and engages people to take action to protect the area. In a broader perspective, Friends of Clayoquot Sound advocates for a bottom-to-top change of social and economic patterns, and promotes sustainable living, locally and globally.

Clayoquot Sound's area is composed of First Nations’ traditional territories that belong to the Ahousaht, Tla-o-qui-aht and Hesquiaht tribes of the Nuu-chah-nulth people. Friends of Clayoquot Sound recognises aboriginal rights and title. When other efforts fail to protect the environment from irreparable damage, Friends of Clayoquot Sound believes in peaceful direct action to mobilize people around a critical issue and create urgency for governments to act.

Friends of Clayoquot Sound's Peaceful Direct Action Code:

Our attitude is one of openness, friendliness and respect toward all beings we encounter.

- We will use no violence, verbal or physical, toward any being.
- We will not damage any property and will discourage others from doing so.
- We will strive for an atmosphere of calm and dignity.
- We will carry no weapons.
- We will not bring or use alcohol or drugs."

== Current issues ==
=== Logging ===
Friends of Clayoquot Sound works to protect all of Clayoquot's ancient temperate rainforest, beginning with the intact areas that are unfragmented by logging. Magnificent 1,000-year-old trees should not be turned into pulp and boards but need to be protected as part of Canada's and the world's natural heritage. Currently, FOCS and the other Clayoquot Sound Conservation Alliance groups are working with First Nations towards a new conservation model in Clayoquot Sound: permanent protection of intact forest areas, coupled with financing for sustainable economic alternatives for First Nations.

=== Salmon farming ===
Twenty salmon farms are located along Clayoquot Sound's coastline. These industrial salmon feedlots are housed in open net-pens suspended in the water along the inlets. Hence their wastes and chemicals are dumped directly into the water, and diseases and parasites can be passed to wild salmon. Friends of Clayoquot Sound opposes the environmentally dangerous practice of open net-pen fish farming and advocates turning aquaculture into a sustainable practice by farming fish in closed containment systems on land.

The Friends of Clayoquot Sound, along with Greenpeace and the David Suzuki Foundation, looked at the experience of fish farming in jurisdictions around the world. The results were described in a "Containing disaster: global lessons on salmon aquaculture" (1997). The report looked at four countries with the longest experience with salmon farming: Norway, Scotland, Ireland, and Chile. In Norway, over a period of thirty years, salmon farming was largely unregulated and farms were densely stocked and sited close one another. They were often located in bays and fjords with little flushing action from the tide. As a result, diseases and parasites previously unknown began occurring in Norway's wild fish population. Along with disease came a decline in wild fish populations.

In a report released in April 1998, FOCS documented an outbreak of infectious salmon anemia (ISA) in New Brunswick resulting in closure of twenty-five per cent of the industry and a net loss of $30 Million. The report concluded that while "some salmon farming problems seem unsolvable, others can be addressed through the industry taking responsibility for its risks and impacts through the introduction of new technology.

In October, 2012, FOCS stated in a press release that the fish farms in Clayoquot Sound are within the UNESCO biosphere reserve and along the shores of a tribal park on Meares Island. "We are concerned this could spread disease, sea lice and pathogens to wild fish," said the release. A letter of objection was sent to Premier Christy Clark. The letter was signed by Tla-o-qui-aht and environmental groups Friends of Clayoquot Sound, Living Oceans Society, David Suzuki Foundation, Georgia Strait Alliance, Wilderness Committee, T. Buck Suzuki Foundation and Greenpeace.

=== Mining ===
There are currently two mining projects at exploration stage in Clayoquot Sound: an open-pit copper mine on Catface Mountain (Chitaapi), and the Fandora gold mine. The mining company would use massive excavation (mountain-top removal) to extract the low-grade ore (0.4% copper) from Catface. Friends of Clayoquot Sound opposes mining in Clayoquot because it is inherently unsustainable and causes long-lasting environmental damage. FOCS is working with local communities to stop these projects and to have Clayoquot Sound legislated as a mine-free area.
