= Charles E. Woodruff =

Charles Edward Woodruff (2 October 1860-13 June 1915) was an American military surgeon, sanitarian, and writer.

After two United States Army Medical Corps stints in The Philippines, Woodruff formed a strong opinion that tropical climates were unsuitable for white people to live in. Woodruff published three books in which argued this belief.

== Early life and education ==
Woodruff was born on 2 October 1860 in Philadelphia, Pennsylvania. He was the son of David S. Woodruff and Mary J. Remster Woodruff.

Woodruff attended high school at Philadelphia's Central High School, and graduated from the University of Pennsylvania with an arts degree. After this, Woodruff attended three years at the United States Naval Academy. However, before completing his Naval Academy education, Woodruff abandoned his plans to become an officer in the U.S. Navy. Instead, he left the Naval Academy and shifted his attention towards studying medicine, graduating from Jefferson Medical College in 1886.

== Military medical career ==
Woodruff began his career as an assistant surgeon in the Navy for one year, before being transferred to the medical corps of the Army. He eventually rose to the rank of lieutenant colonel in the Army Medical Corps.

In 1896, while assistant post surgeon under Maj. Henry Lippincott at Fort Sheridan in Illinois, Woodruff and Lippincott pronounced R. E. A. Crofton (the fort's commander) physically unfit for active service. Crofton protested this assessment, and alleged it was the work of his enemies. Croften had had a highly chaotic tenure at Ford Sheridan, and was ultimately transferred to the command of Fort Bayard in October 1896, before being forced by President Grover Cleveland into early retirement in February 1897.

Woodruff's Army Medical Corps career career included two stints in The Philippines, during which he formed a strong belief that tropical climates are unsuitable for white people to live in. In 1905, he published a book arguing this conclusion: Effect of Tropical Light on White Men. He touched further on the subject in his second book, Expansion of Races, which was published in 1909 and also focused more broadly on anthropological and ethnological facts. He touched on similar topics in his final book, Medical Ethnology. In its obituary of Woodruff, the British Medical Journal noted of his books, "even those who do not agree with his conclusions must admit the wealth of practical experience upon which they are founded and the ingenious argumentation on which they are supported."

Woodruff retired from the Army in 1913, his retirement coming due to ill personal health.

== Civilian career ==
After retiring from the Army, Woodruff went on extensive travels and engaged in extensive studies of medical topics. A "sanitarian" ( environmental health officer), Woodruff's travels saw him observe sanitary concerns across different parts of the world. He wrote many pamphlets of observations made during this time, primarily focusing his writing on medical topics. In 1914, he became associate editor of American Medicine, a role he held at the time of his passing. Shortly before his 1915 death, Woodruff published his final book.

== Personal life ==
Woodruff married Stella M. Caulfield on 22 December 1886 in Washington, D.C. He had two sons.

Woodruff died at the age of 54 from arteriosclerosis on 13 June 1915, while at his residence in New Rochelle, New York.

== Books authored ==
- The Effects of Tropical Light on White Men (1905)
- Expansion of Races (1909)
- Medical Ethnology (1915)
