= Energy transition =

Significant structural change in an energy system

- Field: Energy policy, Sustainability
- Purpose: To transition from fossil-based energy systems to renewable and low-carbon energy sources

Progress of current energy transition to renewable energy: Fossil fuels such as coal, oil, and natural gas still remain the world's primary energy sources, even as renewables are increasing in use.

An energy transition (or energy system transformation) is a major structural change to energy supply and consumption in an energy system. Currently, a transition to sustainable energy is underway to limit climate change. Most of the sustainable energy is renewable energy. Therefore, another term for energy transition is renewable energy transition. The current transition aims to reduce greenhouse gas emissions from energy quickly and sustainably, mostly by phasing-down fossil fuels and changing as many processes as possible to operate on low carbon electricity. A previous energy transition perhaps took place during the Industrial Revolution from 1760 onwards, from wood and other biomass to coal, followed by oil and later natural gas.

Over three-quarters of the world's energy needs are met by burning fossil fuels, but this usage emits greenhouse gases. Energy production and consumption are responsible for most human-caused greenhouse gas emissions. To meet the goals of the 2015 Paris Agreement on climate change, emissions must be reduced as soon as possible and reach net-zero by mid-century. Since the late 2010s, the renewable energy transition has also been driven by the rapidly falling cost of both solar and wind power. After 2024, clean energy is cheaper than ever. Global solar module prices fell 35 percent to less than 9 cents/kWh. EV batteries saw their best price decline in seven years. Another benefit of the energy transition is its potential to reduce the health and environmental impacts of the energy industry.

Heating of buildings is being electrified, with heat pumps being the most efficient technology by far. To improve the flexibility of electrical grids, the installation of energy storage and super grids are vital to enable the use of variable, weather-dependent technologies. However fossil-fuel subsidies are slowing the energy transition.

Energy transitions have varied environmental and social effects, as they can create both burdens and benefits for different communities. Concepts such as energy justice and energy democracy emphasise the importance of equitable distribution of energy costs and benefits, inclusive decision-making processes, and the recognition of historically marginalised groups in energy transitions.

== Definition ==
An energy transition is a broad shift in technologies and behaviours that are needed to replace one source of energy with another. A prime example is the change from a pre-industrial system relying on traditional biomass, wind, water and muscle power to an industrial system characterized by pervasive mechanization, steam power and the use of coal.

The IPCC does not define energy transition in the glossary of its Sixth Assessment Report but it does define transition as: "The process of changing from one state or condition to another in a given period of time. Transition can occur in individuals, firms, cities, regions and nations, and can be based on incremental or transformative change."

== Development of the term ==
After the 1973 oil crisis, the term energy transition was coined by politicians and media. It was popularised by US President Jimmy Carter in his 1977 Address on the Nation on Energy, calling to "look back into history to understand our energy problem. Twice in the last several hundred years, there has been a transition in the way people use energy ... Because we are now running out of gas and oil, we must prepare quickly for a third change to strict conservation and to the renewed use of coal and to permanent renewable energy sources like solar power." The term was later globalised after the 1979 second oil shock, during the 1981 United Nations Conference on New and Renewable Sources of Energy.

From the 1990s, debates on energy transition have increasingly taken climate change mitigation into account. Parties to the agreement committed "to limit global warming to "well below 2 °C, preferably 1.5 °C compared to pre-industrial levels". This requires a rapid energy transition with a downshift of fossil fuel production to stay within the carbon emissions budget.

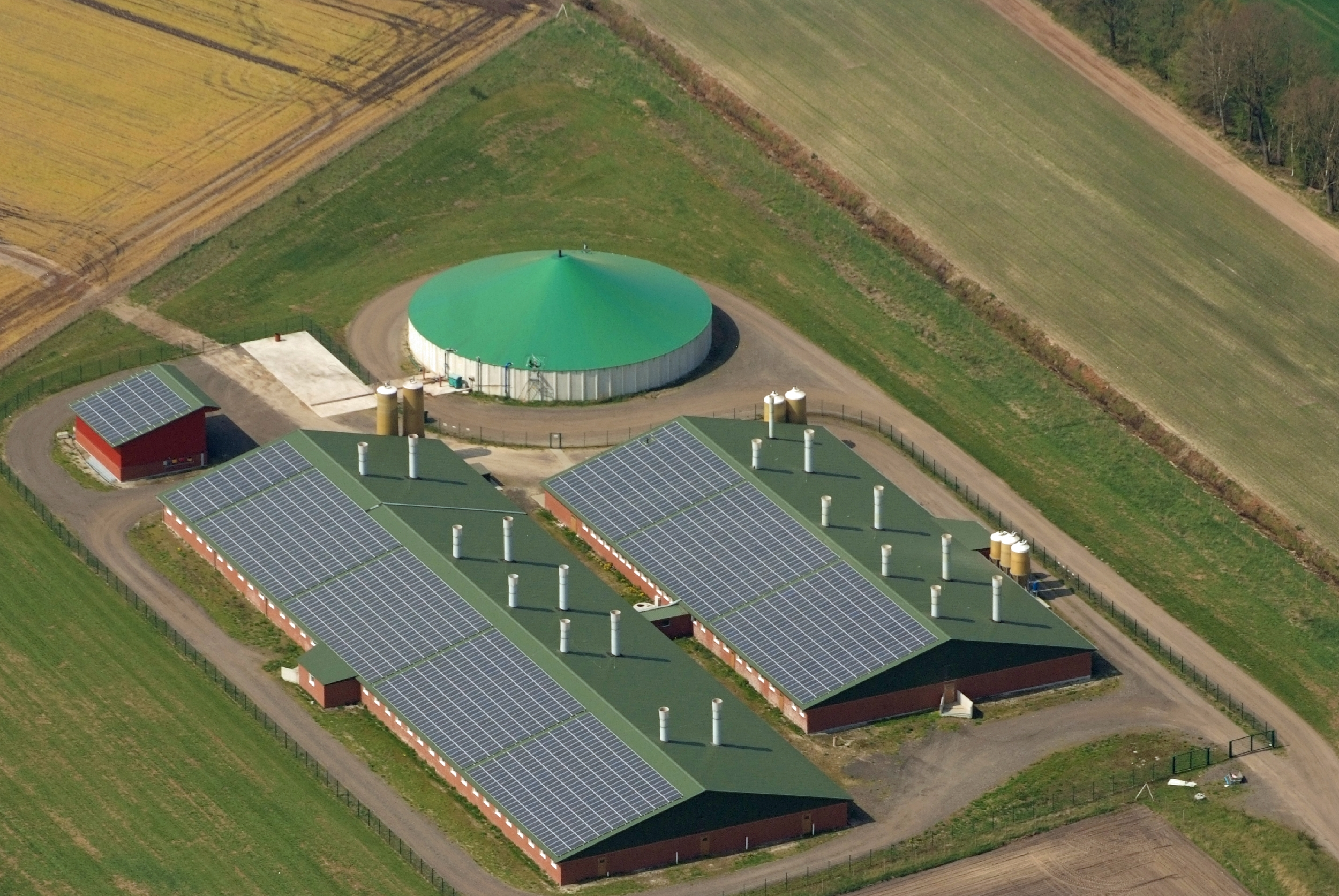
Example of Distributed generation use of renewable energies: Agricultural business with biogas plant and photovoltaic roof

In this context, the term energy transition encompasses a reorientation of energy policy. This could imply a shift from centralized to distributed generation. It also includes attempts to replace overproduction and avoidable energy consumption with energy-saving measures and increased efficiency.

The historical transitions from locally supplied wood, water and wind energies to globally supplied fossil and nuclear fuels has induced growth in end-use demand through the rapid expansion of engineering research, education and standardisation. The mechanisms for the whole-systems changes include new discipline in Transition Engineering amongst all engineering professions, entrepreneurs, researchers and educators.

However it has been argued that the term is a mere slogan and that rather than transitioning, as of 2024, use of all forms of primary energy has increased.

== Examples of past energy transitions ==
Over centuries, energy consumption has evolved from burning wood to fossil fuels (coal, oil, natural gas), and in recent decades to using nuclear, hydroelectric and other renewable energy sources.

Historic approaches to past energy transitions are shaped by two main discourses. One argues that humankind experienced several energy transitions in its past, while the other suggests the term "energy additions" as better reflecting the changes in global energy supply in the last three centuries.

The chronologically first discourse was most broadly described by Vaclav Smil. It underlines the change in the energy mix of countries and the global economy. By looking at data in percentages of the primary energy source used in a given context, it paints a picture of the world's energy systems as having changed significantly over time, going from biomass to coal, to oil, and now a mix of mostly coal, oil and natural gas. Until the 1950s, the economic mechanism behind energy systems was local rather than global.

The second discourse was most broadly described by Jean-Baptiste Fressoz. It emphasises that the term "energy transition" was first used by politicians, not historians, to describe a goal to achieve in the future – not as a concept to analyse past trends. When looking at the sheer amount of energy being used by humankind, the picture is one of ever-increasing consumption of all the main energy sources available to humankind. For instance, the increased use of coal in the 19th century did not replace wood consumption, indeed more wood was burned. Another example is the deployment of passenger cars in the 20th century. This evolution triggered an increase in both oil consumption (to drive the car) and coal consumption (to make the steel needed for the car). In other words, according to this approach, humankind never performed a single energy transition in its history but performed several energy additions.

Contemporary energy transitions differ in terms of motivation and objectives, drivers and governance. As development progressed, different national systems became more and more integrated becoming the large, international systems seen today. Historical changes of energy systems have been extensively studied. While historical energy changes were generally protracted affairs, unfolding over many decades, this does not necessarily hold true for the present energy transition, which is unfolding under very different policy and technological conditions.

For current energy systems, many lessons can be learned from history. The need for large amounts of firewood in early industrial processes in combination with prohibitive costs for overland transportation led to a scarcity of accessible (e.g. affordable) wood, and eighteenth century glass-works "operated like a forest clearing enterprise". When Britain had to resort to coal after largely having run out of wood, the resulting fuel crisis triggered a chain of events that two centuries later culminated in the Industrial Revolution. Similarly, increased use of peat and coal were vital elements paving the way for the Dutch Golden Age, roughly spanning the entire 17th century. Another example where resource depletion triggered technological innovation and a shift to new energy sources is 19th century whaling: whale oil eventually became replaced by kerosene and other petroleum-derived products. To speed up the energy transition it is also conceivable that there will be government buyouts or bailouts of coal mining regions.

== Drivers for current energy transition ==
Drivers for transition to renewable energy

With increasing adoption of renewable energy sources, costs have declined, most notably for energy generated by solar panels.
(Levelized cost of energy (LCOE) is a measure of the average net present cost of electricity generation for a generating plant over its lifetime.)

Deaths caused as a result of fossil fuel electricity generation (areas of rectangles in chart) greatly exceed those resulting from production of renewable energy (rectangles barely visible in chart). Data from 2021.

Production of technology such as renewable energy sources starts a positive feedback loop to form what has been called a virtuous cycle—the opposite of a vicious cycle. For example, as more and more solar modules are deployed, prices fall because of the economies of scale, allowing the technology to become cost-competitive in new applications that in turn increase demand for more deployment.

=== Climate change mitigation and co-benefits ===
A rapid energy transition to very-low or zero-carbon sources is required to mitigate the effects of climate change. Coal, oil and gas combustion account for 89% of CO_{2} emissions and still provide 78% of primary energy consumption.

Despite the knowledge about the risks of climate change and the increasing number of climate policies adopted since the 1980s, however, energy transitions have not accelerated towards decarbonization beyond historical trends and remain far off track in achieving climate targets.

The deployment of renewable energy can generate co-benefits of climate change mitigation: positive socio-economic effects on employment, industrial development, health and energy access. Depending on the country and the deployment scenario, replacing coal power plants can more than double the number of jobs per average MW capacity. The energy transition could create many green jobs, for example in Africa. The costs for retraining workers for the renewable energy industry was found to be trivial for both coal in the U.S. and oil sands in Canada. The latter of which would only demand 2–6% of federal, provincial, and territorial oil and gas subsidies for a single year to be reallocated to provide oil and gas workers with a new career of approximately equivalent pay. In non-electrified rural areas, the deployment of solar mini-grids can significantly improve electricity access.

Employment opportunities by the green transition are associated with the use of renewable energy sources or building activity for infrastructure improvements and renovations.

=== Energy security ===
Another important driver is energy security and independence, with increasing importance in Europe and Taiwan because of the 2022 Russian invasion of Ukraine. Unlike Europe's 2010s dependence on Russian gas, even if China stops supplying solar panels those already installed continue generating electricity. Militaries are using and developing electric vehicles, particularly for their stealthiness, but not tanks. As of 2023 renewable energy in Taiwan is far too small to help in a blockade.

Centralised facilities such as oil refineries and thermal power plants can be put out of action by air attack, whereas although solar can be attacked decentralised power such as solar and wind may be less vulnerable. Solar and batteries reduces risky fuel convoys. However large hydropower plants are vulnerable. Some say that nuclear power plants are unlikely to be military targets, but others conclude that civil NPPs in war zones can be weaponised and exploited by the hostile forces not only for impeding energy supplies (and thus shattering the public morale of the adversary) but also for blackmailing and coercing the decisionmakers of the attacked state and their international allies with a vision of man-made nuclear disaster.

=== Economic development ===
Investment

By 2025, investment in the energy transition had grown to about twice that for fossil fuels (oil, natural gas and coal).

For many developing economies, for example in the mineral-rich countries of Sub-Saharan Africa, the transition to renewable energies is predicted to become a driver of sustainable economic development. The International Energy Agency (IEA) has identified 37 minerals as critical for clean energy technologies and estimates that by 2050 global demand for these will increase by 235 per cent. Africa has large reserves of many of these so-called "green minerals, such as bauxite, cobalt, copper, chromium, manganese and graphite. The African Union has outlined a policy framework, the Africa Mining Vision, to leverage the continent's mineral reserves in pursuit of sustainable development and socio-economic transformation. Achieving these goals requires mineral-rich African economies to transition from commodity export to manufacture of higher value-added products.

=== Cost competitiveness of renewable energies ===
Solar and wind power are scaling up faster than previous sources of electricity. Declining costs, modular design, and improved battery storage help the transition to renewable energy.

From 2010 to 2019, the competitiveness of wind and solar power substantially increased. Unit costs of solar energy dropped sharply by 85%, wind energy by 55%, and lithium-ion batteries by 85%. This has made wind and solar power the cheapest form for new installations in many regions. Levelized costs for combined onshore wind or solar with storage for a few hours are already lower than for gas peaking power plants. In 2021, the new electricity generating capacity of renewables exceeded 80% of all installed power.

== Key technologies and approaches ==
In 2025, growth in solar, wind and other low-carbon electric power exceeded the overall growth in demand for electricity, reducing reliance on fossil fuels and helping to curb greenhouse gas emissions.

The emissions reductions necessary to keep global warming below 2 °C will require a system-wide transformation of the way energy is produced, distributed, stored, and consumed. For a society to replace one form of energy with another, multiple technologies and behaviours in the energy system must change.

Many climate change mitigation pathways envision three main aspects of a low-carbon energy system:

- The use of low-emission energy sources to produce electricity
- Electrification – that is increased use of electricity instead of directly burning fossil fuels
- Accelerated adoption of energy efficiency measures

=== Renewable energy ===
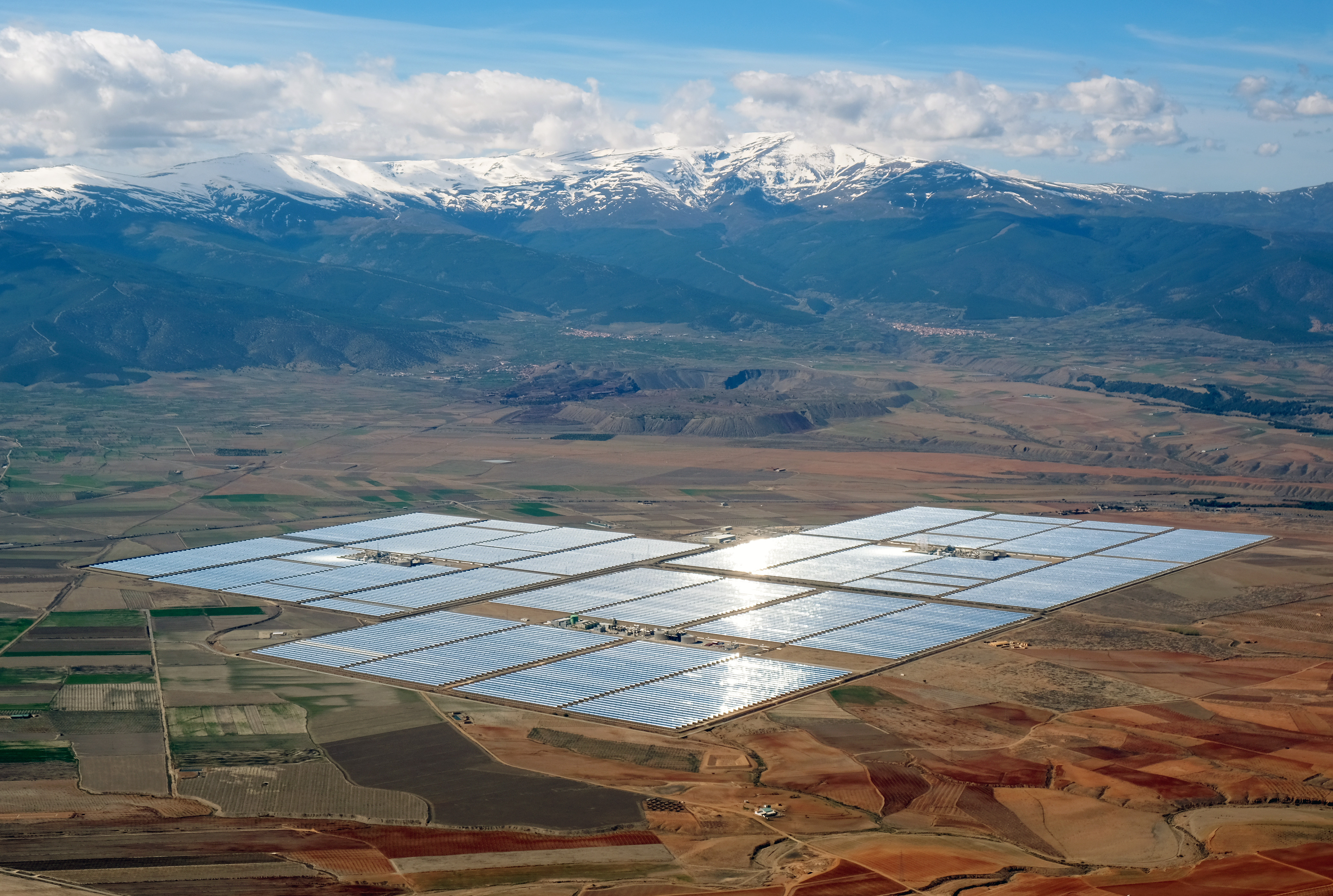
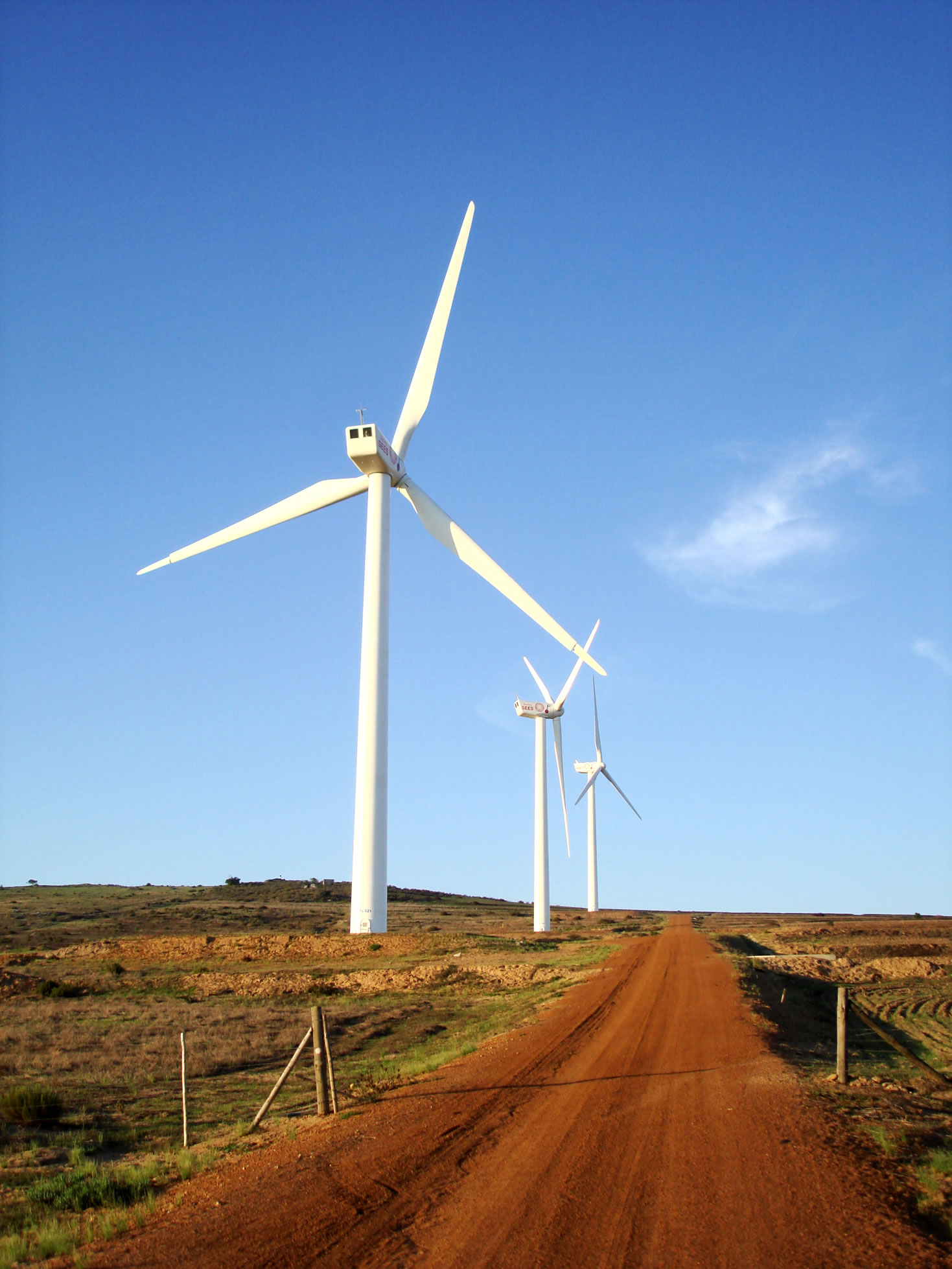
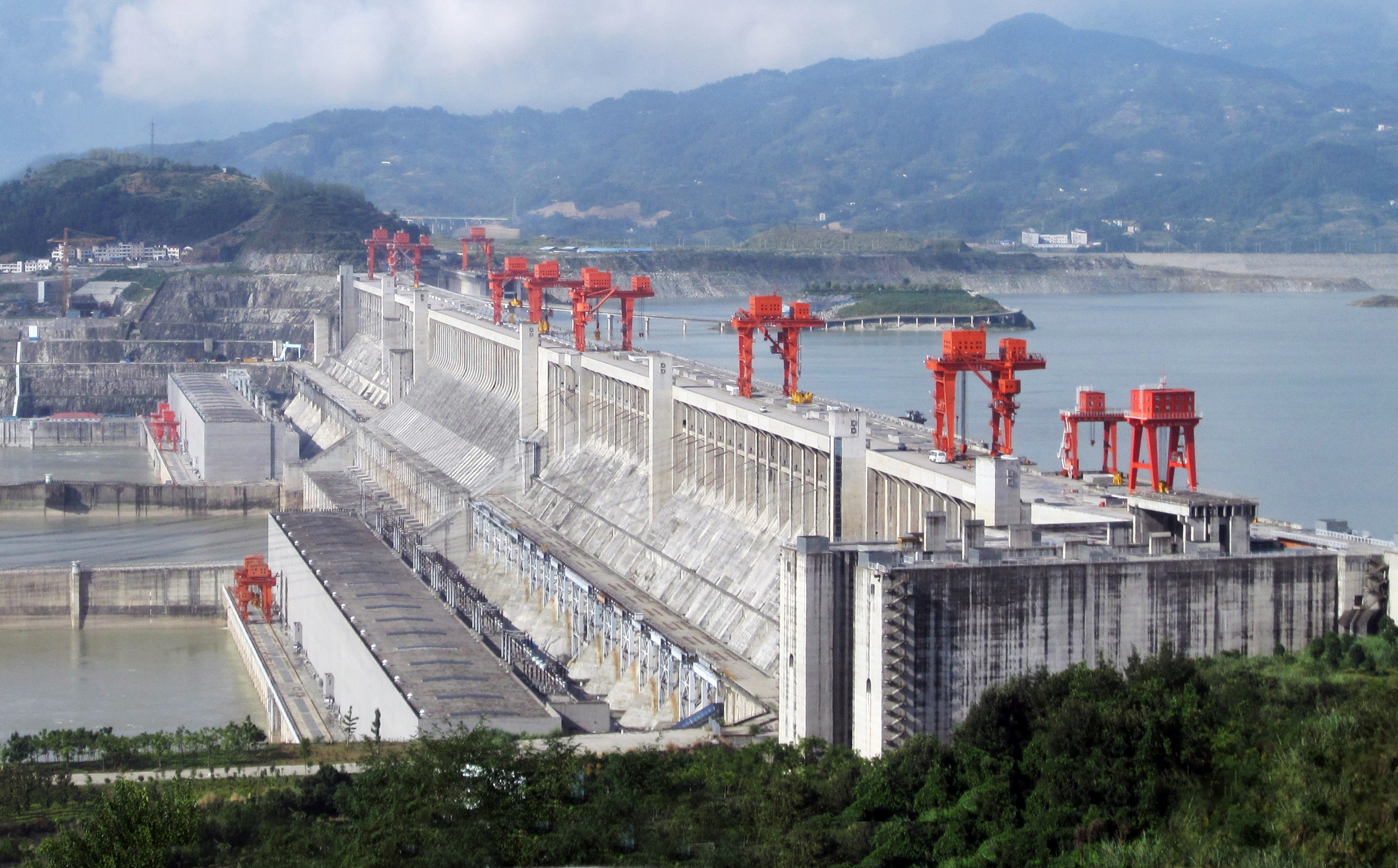
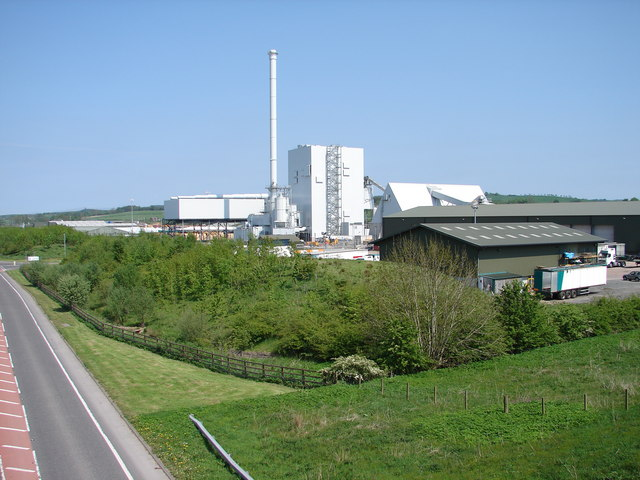
Examples of renewable energy options: concentrated solar power with molten salt heat storage in Spain; wind energy in South Africa; the Three Gorges Dam on the Yangtze River in China; biomass energy plant in Scotland.
Growth in capacity

Renewable energy sources provide an increasing share of overall power capacity.

Renewable energy capacity has steadily grown, led by solar photovoltaic power.

In 2023, electricity generation from wind and solar sources was projected to exceed 30% by 2030, as fossil fuels' use continues to decline.

Rechargeable battery prices for electric vehicles fell, given economies of scale and new cell chemistries improving energy density. However, general inflationary pressures, and rising costs of raw materials and components, inhibited price declines in the early 2020s.

The most important energy sources in the low carbon energy transition are wind power and solar power. They could reduce net emissions by 4 billion tons CO_{2} equivalent per year each, half of it with lower net lifetime costs than the reference. Other renewable energy sources include bioenergy, geothermal energy and tidal energy, but they currently have higher net lifetime costs.

By 2022, hydroelectricity is the largest source of renewable electricity in the world, providing 16% of the world's total electricity in 2019. However, because of its heavy dependence on geography and the generally high environmental and social impact of hydroelectric power plants, the growth potential of this technology is limited. Wind and solar power are considered more scalable, but still require vast quantities of land and materials. They have higher potential for growth. These sources have grown nearly exponentially in recent decades thanks to rapidly decreasing costs. In 2019, wind power supplied 5.3% worldwide electricity while solar power supplied 2.6%.

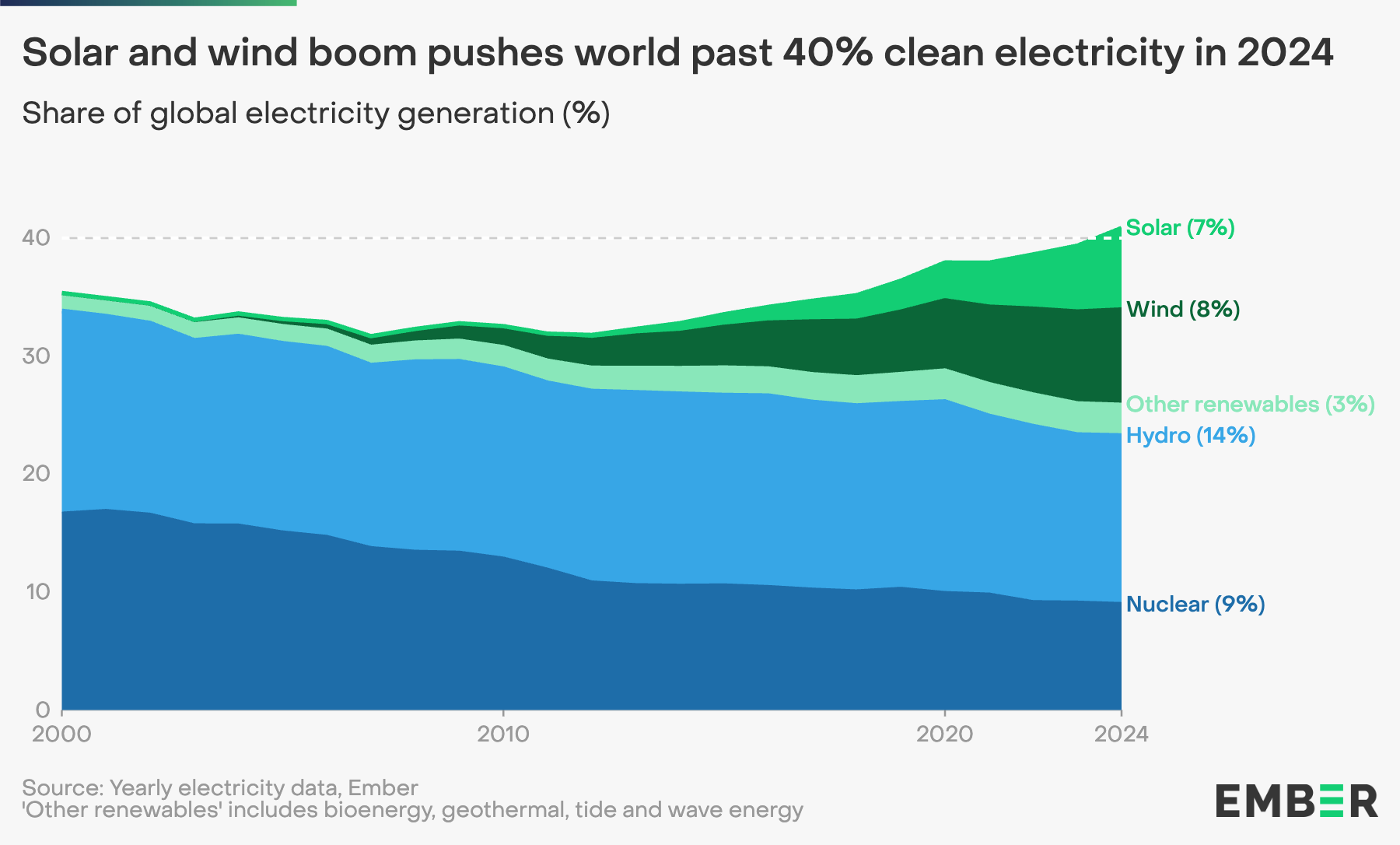
In 2024 the world reached over 40% clean electricity.

While production from most types of hydropower plants can be actively controlled, production from wind and solar power depends on the weather. Electrical grids must be extended and adjusted to avoid wastage. Dammed hydropower is a dispatchable source, while solar and wind are variable renewable energy sources. These sources require dispatchable backup generation or energy storage to provide continuous and reliable electricity. For this reason, storage technologies also play a key role in the renewable energy transition. As of 2020, the largest scale storage technology is pumped storage hydroelectricity, accounting for the great majority of energy storage capacity installed worldwide. Other important forms of energy storage are electric batteries and power to gas.

The "Electricity Grids and Secure Energy Transitions" report by the IEA emphasizes the necessity of increasing grid investments to over $600 billion annually by 2030, up from $300 billion, to accommodate the integration of renewable energy. By 2040, the grid must expand by more than 80 million kilometers to manage renewable sources, which are projected to account for over 80% of the global power capacity increase over the next two decades. Failure to enhance grid infrastructure timely could lead to an additional 58 gigatonnes of carbon dioxide emissions by 2050, significantly risking a 2 °C global temperature rise.

==== Integration of variable renewable energy sources ====
With the integration of renewable energy, local electricity production is becoming more variable. It has been recommended that "coupling sectors, energy storage, smart grids, demand side management, sustainable biofuels, hydrogen electrolysis and derivatives will ultimately be needed to accommodate large shares of renewables in energy systems". Fluctuations can be smoothened by combining wind and sun power and by extending electricity grids over large areas. This reduces the dependence on local weather conditions.

With highly variable prices, electricity storage and grid extension become more competitive. Researchers have found that "costs for accommodating the integration of variable renewable energy sources in electricity systems are expected to be modest until 2030". Furthermore, "it will be more challenging to supply the entire energy system with renewable energy".

Fast fluctuations increase with a high integration of wind and solar energy. They can be addressed by operating reserves. Large-scale batteries can react within seconds and are increasingly used to keep the electricity grid stable.

==== 100% renewable energy ====
100% renewable energy is the goal of using fully renewable resources for all electric energy consumption. 100% renewable energy for electricity, heating, cooling and transport is motivated by greenhouse gas emissions, pollution, and other environmental issues, as well as economic and energy security concerns. Shifting the total global primary energy supply to renewable sources requires a transition of the energy system, since most of today's energy is derived from non-renewable fossil fuels.

Research into this topic is fairly new, with few studies published before 2009, but has gained increasing attention in recent years. A cross-sectoral, holistic approach is seen as an important feature of 100% renewable energy systems and is based on the assumption "that the best solutions can be found only if one focuses on the synergies between the sectors" of the energy system such as electricity, heat, transport or industry.

=== Nuclear power ===
Timeline of commissioned and decommissioned nuclear capacity since the 1950s

In the 1970s and 1980s, nuclear power gained a large share in some countries. In France and Slovakia more than half of the electrical power is still nuclear. It is a low carbon energy source but comes with risks and increasing costs. Since the late 1990s, deployment has slowed down. Decommissioning increases as many reactors are close to the end of their lifetime or long before because of anti-nuclear sentiments. Germany stopped its last three nuclear power plants by mid April 2023. On the other hand, the China General Nuclear Power Group is aiming for 200 GW by 2035, produced by 150 additional reactors.

=== Electrification ===
Electrification rates of different countries compared to OECD Europe

Electricity as a share of primary energy (2024)

With the switch to clean energy sources where power is generated via electricity, end uses of energy such as transportation and heating need to be electrified to run on these clean energy sources. Concurrent with this switch is an expansion of the grid to handle larger amounts of generated electricity to supply to these end uses. Two key areas of electrification are electric vehicles and heat pumps.

It is easier to sustainably produce electricity than it is to sustainably produce liquid fuels. Therefore, adoption of electric vehicles is a way to make transport more sustainable. While electric vehicle technology is relatively mature in road transport, electric shipping and aviation are still early in their development, hence sustainable liquid fuels may have a larger role to play in these sectors.

A key sustainable solution to heating is electrification (heat pumps, or the less efficient electric heater). The IEA estimates that heat pumps currently provide only 5% of space and water heating requirements globally, but could provide over 90%. Use of ground source heat pumps not only reduces total annual energy loads associated with heating and cooling, it also flattens the electric demand curve by eliminating the extreme summer peak electric supply requirements. However, heat pumps and resistive heating alone will not be sufficient for the electrification of industrial heat. This because in several processes higher temperatures are required which cannot be achieved with these types of equipment. For example, for the production of ethylene via steam cracking, temperatures as high as 900 °C are required. Hence, drastically new processes are required. Nevertheless, power-to-heat is expected to be the first step in the electrification of the chemical industry with an expected large-scale implementation by 2025.

== Economic and geopolitical aspects ==
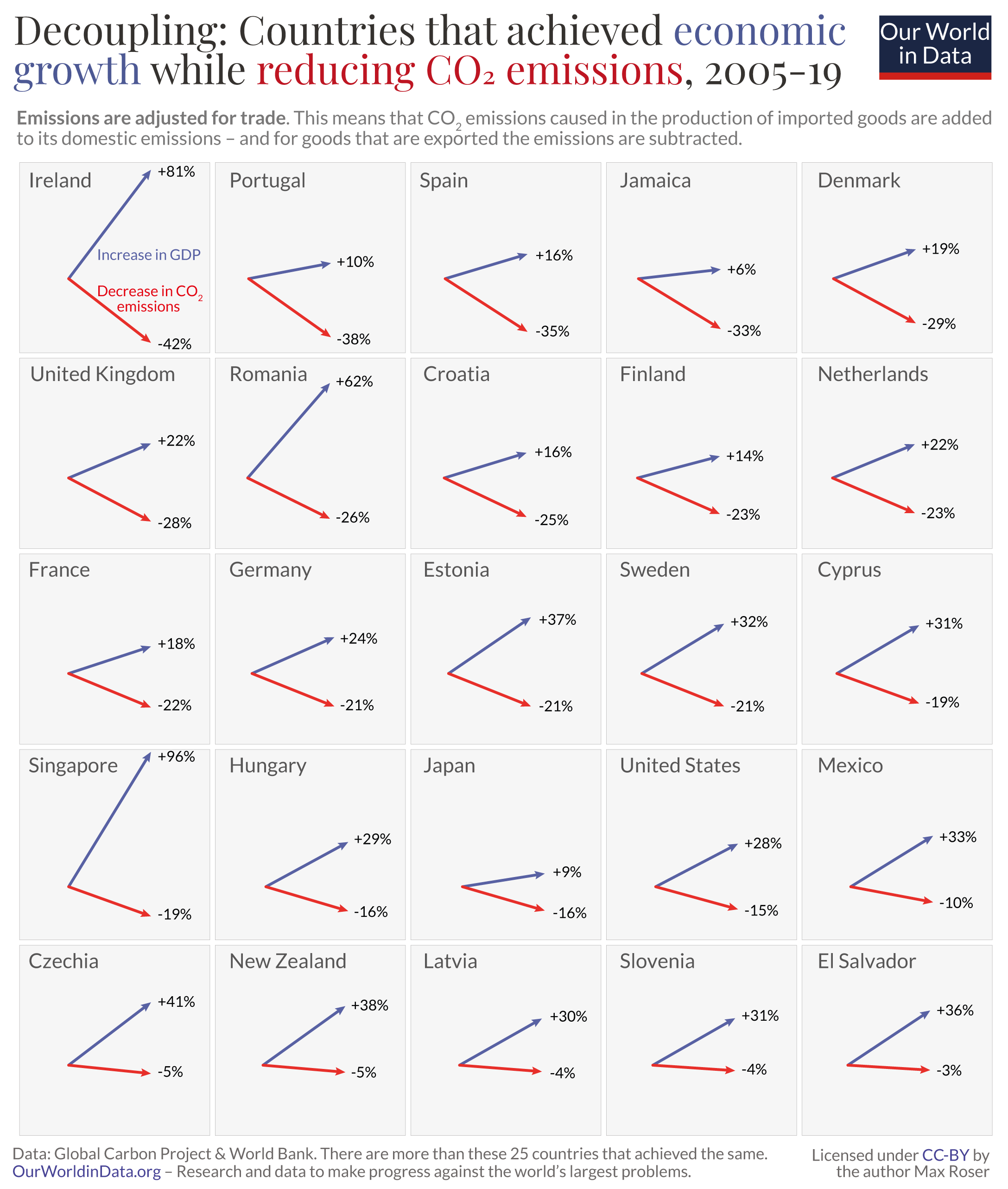
Countries that managed to reduce their greenhouse gas emissions (working towards a low-carbon economy) while still growing their economy. This is called eco-economic decoupling.

A shift in energy sources has the potential to redefine relations and dependencies between countries, stakeholders and companies. Countries or land owners with resources – fossil or renewable – face massive losses or gains depending on the development of any energy transition. In 2021, energy costs reached 13% of global gross domestic product. Global rivalries have contributed to the driving forces of the economics behind the low carbon energy transition. Technological innovations developed within a country have the potential to become an economic force.

=== Influences ===
Acceptance of wind and solar facilities in one's community is stronger among Democrats (blue), while acceptance of nuclear power plants is stronger among Republicans (red).

The energy transition discussion is heavily influenced by contributions from the fossil fuel industries. One way that oil companies are able to continue their work despite growing environmental, social and economic concerns is by lobbying local and national governments.

Historically, the fossil fuel lobby has been highly successful in limiting regulations. From 1988 to 2005, Exxon Mobil, one of the largest oil companies in the world, spent nearly $16 million in anti-climate change lobbying and providing misleading information about climate change to the general public. The fossil fuel industry acquires significant support through the existing banking and investment structure. The concept that the industry should no longer be financially supported has led to the social movement known as divestment. Divestment is defined as the removal of investment capital from stocks, bonds or funds in oil, coal and gas companies for both moral and financial reasons.

Banks, investing firms, governments, universities, institutions, and businesses are all facing pressure from the divestment movement, and many, such as the Rockefeller Brothers Fund, the University of California, New York City, have begun to reduce their investments in fossil fuels.

In 2024 the International Renewable Energy Agency (IRENA) projected that by 2050, over half of the world's energy will be carried by electricity and over three-quarters of the global energy mix will be from renewables. Although overtaken by both biomass and clean hydrogen, fossil fuels were still projected to supply 12% of energy. The transition is expected to reshape geopolitical power by reducing reliance on long-distance fossil fuel trade and enhancing the importance of regional energy markets.

=== Oil prices and international conflict ===
Higher oil prices are linked to fewer conflicts started by oil-producing countries. When oil prices rise from relatively low to relatively high levels, the expected number of military disputes between countries drops by about half. The evidence also shows that when oil prices are low, oil-producing countries are more likely to enter conflicts with other oil-producing countries. This suggests that the global shift away from fossil fuels may not automatically lead to more peace among oil-producing states and, at least in the short term, could even increase the risk of conflict.

The transition away from fossil fuels may have complex security implications for major oil producers. Contrary to the 'pacification' hypothesis that suggests low oil revenue leads to peace. Historical data from 1960 to 2014 suggests that periods of declining oil prices are associated with higher rates of conflict initiation by petrostates. Consequently, the global energy transition may inadvertently increase the risk of regional conflicts among oil-dependent nations as they face long-term revenue declines.

== Justice, social, and environmental aspects ==
A renewable energy transition can present negative social impacts for some people who rely on the existing energy economy or who are affected by mining for minerals required for the transition. Equally, the transition can provide opportunities for populations to achieve energy justice, supporting the idea of a "just transition". Energy justice frameworks ensure that equity, fairness, and human rights are integrated into the planning and implementation of energy transitions. This has led to calls for a just transition, which the IPCC defines as, "A set of principles, processes and practices that aim to ensure that no people, workers, places, sectors, countries or regions are left behind in the transition from a high-carbon to a low carbon economy."

=== Energy justice impacts ===
Energy justice looks to support communities in achieving access to affordable, safe, and sustainable energy sources, while ensuring that they are involved in the decision-making process. Academic literature finds that energy justice fulfilment can be fulfilled from meeting the procedural, distributive, and recognition dimensions of justice.

Procedural justice requires active involvement in legal and decision-making processes, emphasising access to information and the ability of individuals to participate in meaningful consultation. Transparency throughout the decision-making process is a key element of procedural justice. In the German village of Feldheim the village was transformed into an energy self-sufficient settlement through community-owned electricity and heating grids supplied by local renewable energy. Local residents and developers engaged in a step-by-step consultation process that included periodic village meetings and the use of "translators" to explain technical information in accessible terms. This process enabled residents to understand and influence the project, demonstrating how procedural justice can be achieved in practice. In the eyes of locals, this legitimised the energy transition.

In the energy context, distributive justice relates to the allocation of the benefits and burdens of the energy sector. This includes revenues from the energy economy, infrastructure locations, and energy costs. Urban centres commonly see increased benefits when undergoing energy transitions, while rural locations may be faced with increased burdens due to such developments. Considering and addressing the locations of facilities and resources is necessary to fulfil distributive justice. In Samsø, Denmark, a diversified ownership model for wind turbines was implemented, where at-cost shares were reserved for residents. This ensures that financial benefits are gained by the local community, rather than solely for external investors. However, investments were primarily made by land-owning farmers with access to capital, which meant that these groups captured a larger share of the benefits than the wider community. This may undermine the success of distributive justice.

Recognition justice in the energy context focuses on acknowledging the rights and needs of groups that have been historically marginalised or excluded from energy decision-making. It is strongly associated with the acknowledgement of indigenous rights and sovereignty, opposing the cultural erasure of indigenous knowledge, culture, and environmental practices. It is common that indigenous governance systems are based on alternative environmental ethics and spiritual relations with the land. Recognising and interacting with these governance systems is considered necessary to fulfill this dimension of justice.

Energy justice is also closely associated with the energy democracy concept, which seeks to empower communities through local ownership and control of a renewable-focused energy sector. In an energy democracy, individuals move beyond passive energy consumers to become "energy citizens". Use of local energy sources may stabilise and stimulate some local economies, create opportunities for energy trade between communities, states and regions, and increase energy security. An example of energy democracy implementation was seen in Mauritius' Power Shift Campaign, where solar panels were installed on local farmers' greenhouse roofs. These supplied energy to the community and provided an additional stream of income for the farmers, improving local livelihoods and diversifying the economy.

=== Social impacts ===
Energy transitions may result in differing social consequences, which may be direct or consequential. These depend on communities' social resources, baseline conditions of employment, engagement in renewable energy developments.

Energy transitions may exacerbate energy insecurity for low-income households or communities of colour. Costs associated with renewable energy infrastructure are typically passed on to consumers, which disproportionately affects low-income households who already spend higher proportions of their income onenergy. Households of colour and low-income families are also statistically more likely to live in energy-inefficient housing, increasing the burden of rising energy prices.

Energy transitions alter the employment landscape; for example, coal mining is economically important in some regions, and transitions to renewables would decrease its economicviability and result in severe impacts on the communities that rely on this industry. In regions which have been historically based upon fossil-fuel industries, the tax base may be significantly impacted; in Boone County, West Virginia, the decline in revenue from the coal industry forced the closure of schools and cuts to public services such as health and transport.

Employment loss is a primary consequence of the phasing-out of fossil-fuel based industries. While the decarbonisation movement is predicted to result in a net positive impact on global employment, many of the new jobs are located in different regions from those experiencing job losses in fossil-fuel industries.

Industry loss, without replacement, can lead to the "out-migration" of young people, altering the social demography of affected communities. Community job loss is also linked to increased suicide and homicide rates, while public health outcomes may deteriorate.

Infrastructure changes associated with renewable energy implementation may result in conflict, as a result of development, population displacement, and environmental and/or aesthetic impacts. Tensions between developers and local communities are common, where residents may exhibit "NIMBYism" against infrastructure implementation. Additionally, large-scale renewable energy infrastructure may result in involuntary displacement of populations from homes or cultural lands.

As such, these communities may face economic collapse when the coal mining businesses move elsewhere or disappear altogether. This broken system perpetuates the poverty and vulnerability that decreases the adaptive capacity of coal mining communities. Potential mitigation could include expanding the program base for vulnerable communities to assist with new training programs, opportunities for economic development and subsidies to assist with the transition.

Increasing energy prices resulting from an energy transition may negatively impact developing countries including Vietnam and Indonesia.

Increased mining for lithium, cobalt, nickel, copper, and other critical minerals needed for expansion of renewable energy infrastructure has created increased environmental conflict and environmental justice issues for some communities.

=== Labour ===
A large portion of the global workforce works directly or indirectly for the fossil fuel economy. Moreover, many other industries are currently dependent on unsustainable energy sources (such as the steel industry or cement and concrete industry). Transitioning these workforces during the rapid period of economic change requires considerable forethought and planning. The international labor movement has advocated for a just transition that addresses these concerns.

Recently, an energy crisis is upon the nations of Europe as a result of dependence on Russia's natural gas, which was cut off during the Russia-Ukraine war. This goes to show that humanity is still heavily dependent on fossil fuel energy sources and care should be taken to have a smooth transition, less energy-shortage shocks cripple the very efforts to effectively energise the transition.

== Risks and barriers ==
Amongst the key issues to consider in relation to the pace of the global transition to renewables is how well individual electric companies are able to adapt to the changing reality of the power sector. For example, to date, the uptake of renewables by electric utilities has remained slow, hindered by their continued investment in fossil fuel generation capacity.

Incomplete regulations on clean energy uptake and concerns about electricity shortages have been identified as key barriers to the energy transition in coal-dependent, fast developing economies such as Vietnam.

Researchers found that social sentiments held by U.S. residents have proven to be barriers for energy transitions. The U.S. Department of Energy plans for wind energy to provide 35% of the electrical grid by 2050 are bringing wind energy projects closer to communities. Sentiments for wind energy opposition in local communities include sound annoyance, perceived health effects, and the reduction of scenic landscapes and views.

Anticipated economic aspects are believed to be the most influential variable to perceptions of proposed wind energy developments. Economic barriers to acceptance of renewable energy include local tax increases, increase in electricity rates, decrease in tourism, property value impacts and distributional inequality. However, rural economic development, creation of jobs, investment opportunities, and lower electricity costs stand as possible benefits.

== Examples by country ==
Though the share of electricity generation from renewables has increased since 2010, there is substantial variance among major world regions.

Sales of electric vehicles (EVs) indicate a trend away from gas-powered vehicles that generate greenhouse gases.

Global energy consumption by source (raw quantities)

Global energy consumption by source (percent share)

From 2000 to 2012 coal was the source of energy with the total largest growth. The use of oil and natural gas also had considerable growth, followed by hydropower and renewable energy. Renewable energy grew at a rate faster than any other time in history during this period. The demand for nuclear energy decreased, partly in reaction to a number of high-profile accidents (Three Mile Island in 1979, Chernobyl in 1986, and Fukushima in 2011) but also due to the rising cost of nuclear energy which has made it more expensive than all utility scale alternatives.

More recently, consumption of coal has declined relative to low carbon energy. Coal dropped from about 29% of the global total primary energy consumption in 2015 to 27% in 2017, and non-hydro renewables were up to about 4% from 2%.

=== Asia ===
==== China ====
Most energy in China comes from coal

Development of carbon dioxide emissions in China

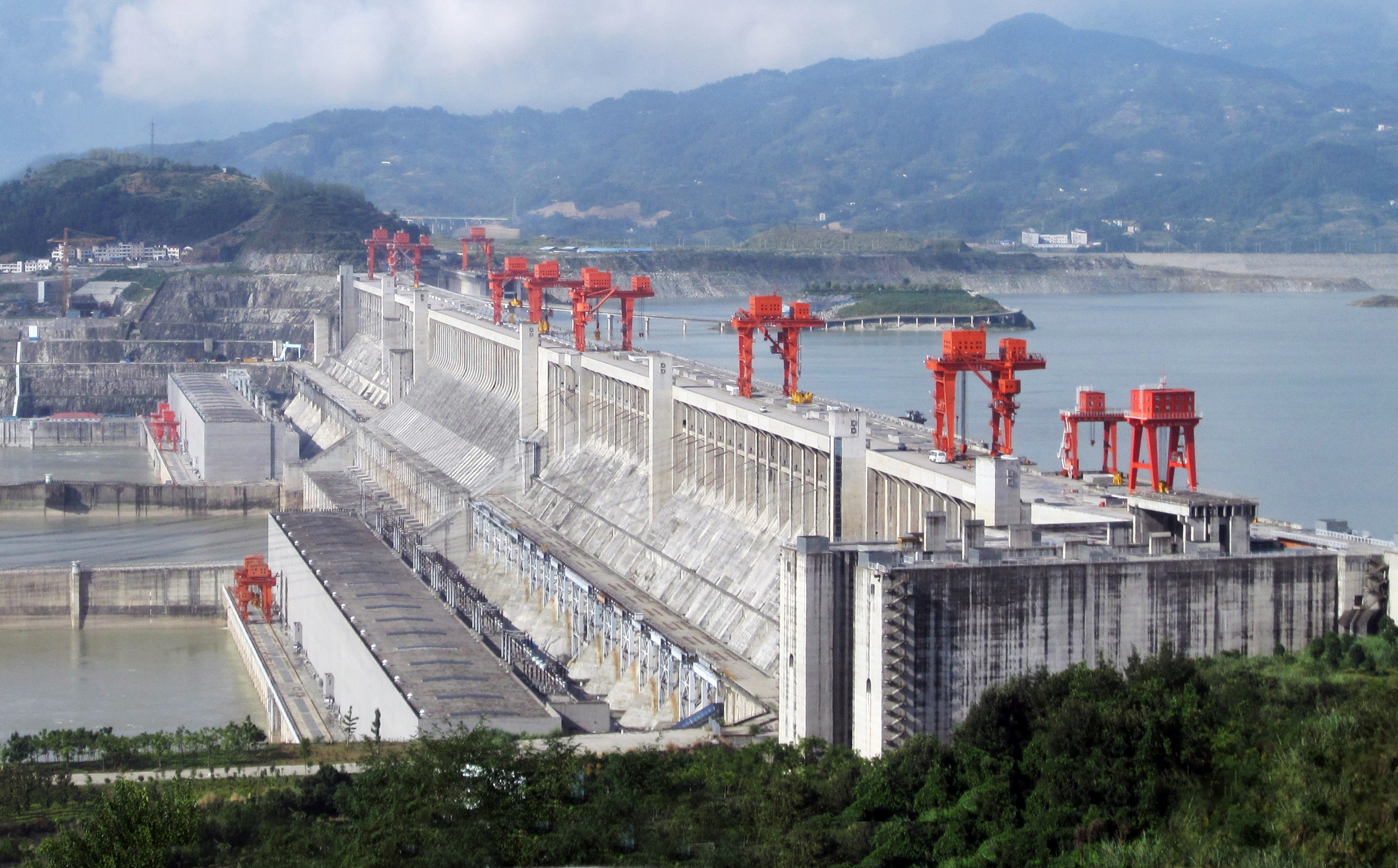
The 22,500 MW Three Gorges Dam hydroelectric power plant in China, the largest hydroelectric power station in the world.

The People's Republic of China is both the world's largest energy consumer and the largest industrial country. China is currently the world's largest emitter of greenhouse gases, and coal in China is a major cause of global warming. China is also the world's largest renewable energy producer, and the largest producer of hydroelectricity, solar power and wind power in the world. The energy policy of China is connected to its industrial policy, where the goals of China's industrial production dictate its energy demand management.

Being a country that depends heavily on foreign petroleum import for both domestic consumption and as raw materials for light industry manufacturing, electrification is a huge component of the Chinese national energy policy.

The Fourteenth Five-Year Plan placed increased emphasis on the green transition as essential to China's pursuit of high-quality and sustainable growth.

==== India ====
India has set renewable energy goals to transition 50% of its total energy consumption into renewable sources in the Paris climate accords. As of 2022 the Central Electricity Authority are well on track of achieving their goals, producing 160 GW electricity from clean sources like solar, wind, hydro power and nuclear power plants, this is 40% of its total capacity. India is ranked third on Ernst and Young's renewable energy country attractive index behind the US and China.

Hydro electric power plants are a major part of India's energy infrastructure since the days of its independence in 1947. Former prime Minister Jawahar Lal Nehru called them the " temples of modern India" and believed them to be key drivers of modernity and industrialism for the nascent republic. Notable examples of hydro power stations include the 2400 MW Tehri hydropower complex, the 1960 MW Koyna hydroelectric project and the 1670 MW Srisailam Dam. Recently, India has given due importance to emerging renewable technologies like solar power plants and wind farms. They house 3 of the world's top 5 solar farms, including world's largest 2255 MW Bhadla Solar Park in and world's second-largest solar park of 2000 MW Pavgada Solar Park and 100 MW Kurnool Ultra mega solar park.

While there has been positive change, air pollution from coal still kills many people and India has to cut down its reliance on traditional coal based power production as it still accounts for around 50% of its energy production. India is also moving towards its goal for electrification of the automotive industry, aiming to have at least 30% EV ownership among private vehicles by 2030.

==== Vietnam ====
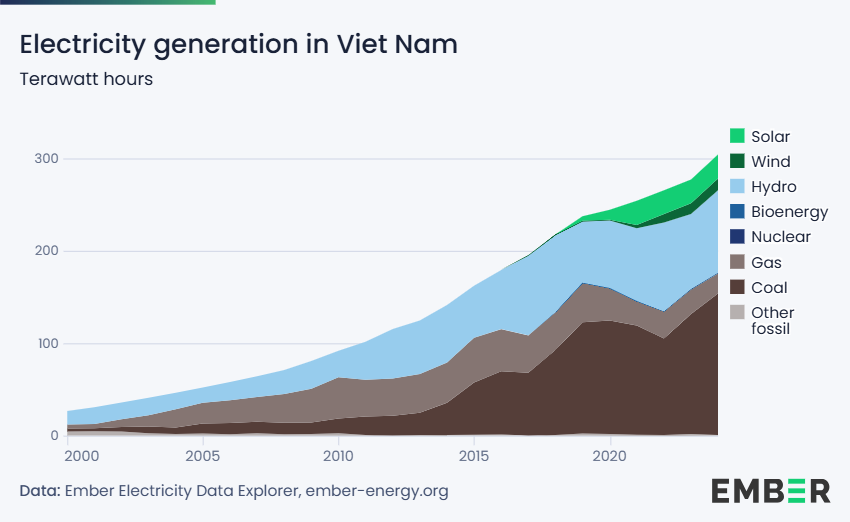
Electricity generation by source in Vietnam in terawatt hours

Vietnam has led the Southeast Asia in solar and wind uptake, achieving about 20 GW in 2022 from almost zero in 2017. Thailand has the highest number of EV registrations, with 218,000 in 2022. The energy transition in Southeast Asia can be summarized as: Challenging, achievable, and interdependent. This implies that while there are obstacles, feasibility largely relies on international support.

Public demand for improved local environmental quality and government's aims to promote a green economy are found to be key drivers in Vietnam.

Governments ambition to attract international support for green growth initiatives and public demand for a clean environment have been found to be drivers of the energy transition in developing countries, such as Vietnam. Thanks to a relatively more conducive investment environment, Vietnam is poised to a faster energy transition than some other ASEAN members

=== Europe ===
==== European Union ====
As a source of electric power in the EU, renewables overtook fossil fuels by 2020, and solar and wind together exceeded fossil fuels by 2025.

The European Green Deal is a set of policy initiatives by the European Commission with the overarching aim of making Europe climate neutral in 2050. An impact assessed plan will also be presented to increase the EU's greenhouse gas emission reductions target for 2030 to at least 50% and towards 55% compared with 1990 levels. The plan is to review each existing law on its climate merits, and also introduce new legislation on the circular economy, building renovation, biodiversity, farming and innovation. The president of the European Commission, Ursula von der Leyen, stated that the European Green Deal would be Europe's "man on the Moon moment", as the plan would make Europe the first climate-neutral continent.

A survey found that digitally advanced companies put more money into energy-saving strategies. In the European Union, 59% of companies that have made investments in both basic and advanced technologies have also invested in energy efficiency measures, compared to only 50% of US firms in the same category. Overall, there is a significant disparity between businesses' digital profiles and investments in energy efficiency.

==== Germany ====
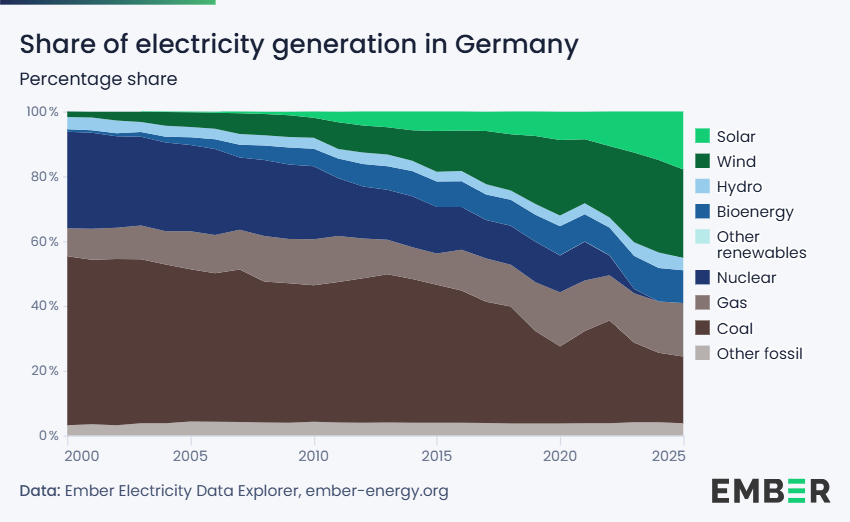
Share of electricity generation in Germany - percentage share

Germany has played an outsized role in the transition away from fossil fuels and nuclear power to renewables. The energy transition in Germany is known as die Energiewende (literally, "the energy turn") indicating a turn away from old fuels and technologies to new one. The key policy document outlining the Energiewende was published by the German government in September 2010, some six months before the Fukushima nuclear accident; legislative support was passed in September 2010.

The policy has been embraced by the German federal government and has resulted in a huge expansion of renewables, particularly wind power. Germany's share of renewables has increased from around 5% in 1999 to 17% in 2010, reaching close to the OECD average of 18% usage of renewables. In 2022 Germany has a share of 46,2 % and surpassed the OECD average. A large driver for this increase in the shares of renewables energy are decreases in cost of capital. Germany boasts some of the lowest cost of capitals for renewable solar and wind onshore energy worldwide. In 2021 the International Renewable Energy Agency reported capital costs of around 1.1% and 2.4% for solar and wind onshore. This constitutes a significant decrease from previous numbers in the early 2000s, where capital costs hovered around 5.1% and 4.5% respectively. This decrease in capital costs was influenced by a variety of economic and political drivers. Following the 2008 financial crisis, Germany eased the refinancing regulations on banks by giving out cheap loans with low interest rates in order to stimulate the economy again.

During this period, the industry around renewable energies also started to experience learning effects in manufacturing, project organisation as well as financing thanks to rising investment and order volumes. This coupled with various forms of subsidies contributed to a large reduction of the capital cost and the levelized cost of electricity (LCOE) for solar and onshore wind power. As the technologies have matured and become integral parts of the existing sociotechnical systems it is to be expected that in the future, experience effects and general interest rates will be key determinants for the cost-competitiveness of these technologies.

Producers have been guaranteed a fixed feed-in tariff for 20 years, guaranteeing a fixed income. Energy co-operatives have been created, and efforts were made to decentralize control and profits. The large energy companies have a disproportionately small share of the renewables market. Nuclear power stations were closed, and the existing nine stations will close earlier than necessary, in 2022.

The reduction of reliance on nuclear stations has had the consequence of increased reliance on fossil fuels. One factor that has inhibited efficient employment of new renewable energy has been the lack of an accompanying investment in power infrastructure to bring the power to market. It is believed 8300 km of power lines must be built or upgraded.

Different Länder have varying attitudes to the construction of new power lines. Industry has had their rates frozen and so the increased costs of the Energiewende have been passed on to consumers, who have had rising electricity bills. Germans in 2013 had some of the highest electricity costs in Europe. Nonetheless, for the first time in more than ten years, electricity prices for household customers fell at the beginning of 2015.

==== Switzerland ====
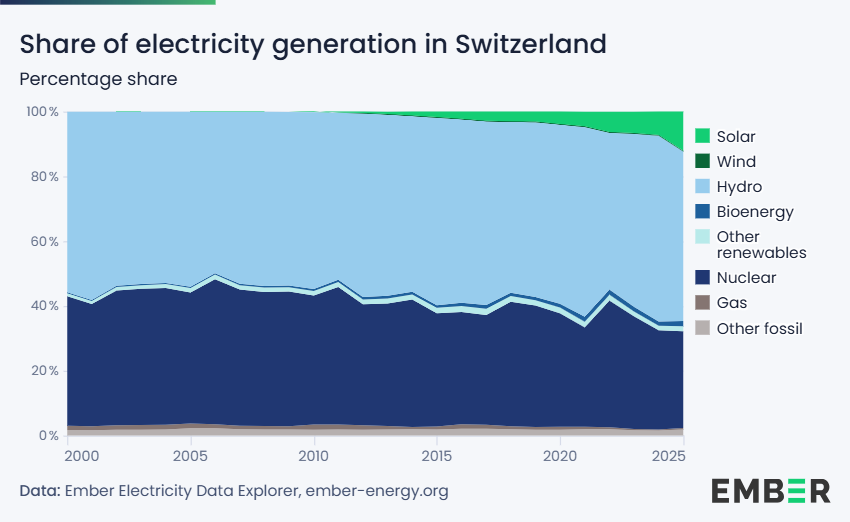
Switzerland electricity generation by source - percentage share

Due to the high share of hydroelectricity (59.6%) and nuclear power (31.7%) in electricity production, Switzerland's per capita energy-related CO_{2} emissions are 28% lower than the European Union average and roughly equal to those of France. On 21 May 2017, Swiss voters accepted the new Energy Act establishing the 'energy strategy 2050'. The aims of the energy strategy 2050 are: to reduce energy consumption; to increase energy efficiency; and to promote renewable energies (such as water, solar, wind and geothermal power as well as biomass fuels). The Energy Act of 2006 forbids the construction of new nuclear power plants in Switzerland.

==== United Kingdom ====
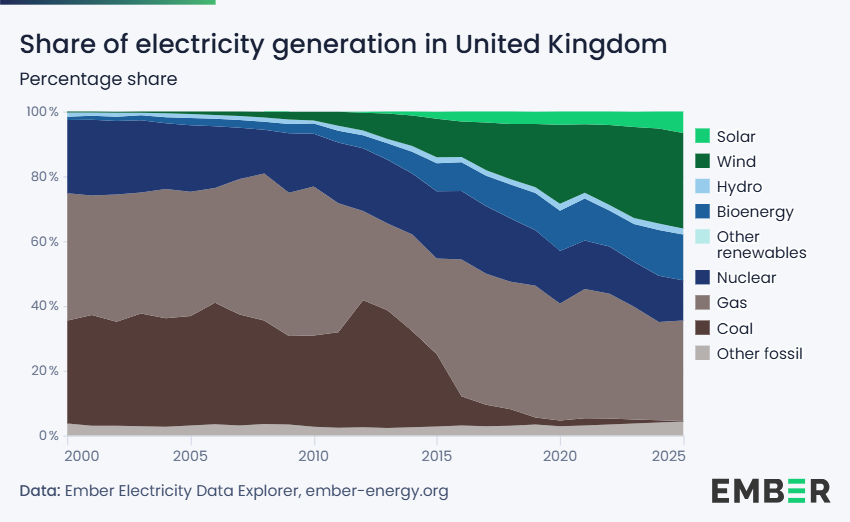
United Kingdom electricity generation by source - percentage share

By law production of greenhouse gas emissions by the United Kingdom will be reduced to net zero by 2050. To help in reaching this statutory goal national energy policy is mainly focusing on the country's off-shore wind power and delivering new and advanced nuclear power. The increase in national renewable power – particularly from biomass – together with the 20% of electricity generated by nuclear power in the United Kingdom meant that by 2019 low carbon British electricity had overtaken that generated by fossil fuels.

In order to meet the net zero target energy networks must be strengthened. Electricity is only a part of energy in the United Kingdom, so natural gas used for industrial and residential heat and petroleum used for transport in the United Kingdom must also be replaced by either electricity or another form of low-carbon energy, such as sustainable bioenergy crops or green hydrogen.

Although the need for the energy transition is not disputed by any major political party, in 2020 there is debate about how much of the funding to try and escape the COVID-19 recession should be spent on the transition, and how many jobs could be created, for example in improving energy efficiency in British housing. Some believe that due to post-covid government debt that funding for the transition will be insufficient. Brexit may significantly affect the energy transition, but this is unclear as of 2020. The government is urging UK business to sponsor the climate change conference in 2021, possibly including energy companies but only if they have a credible short-term plan for the energy transition.

== See also ==
- Hydrogen economy – Using hydrogen to decarbonize more sectors
- List of countries by renewable electricity production
- List of energy storage power plants
- List of renewable energy topics by country and territory
- Low carbon economy – Climate-friendly economy
- Methanol economy – Using methanol in the energy transition
- Mobility transition – Change in transport planning and policy
