= Energy democracy =

Concept in environmental justice movement

Energy democracy is a concept developed within the environmental justice movement that pairs the renewable energy transition with efforts to democratize the production and management of energy resources— including the social ownership of energy infrastructure, decentralization of energy systems, and expansion of public participation in energy-related policymaking. Energy democracy calls for greater participation in energy transitions and is being used in literature to describe an overall ongoing democratic transition. Energy democracy and climate justice are increasingly associated. Energy democracy is also referenced alongside the concept of energy justice, albeit with its own distinct implications. Rather than view decarbonization as a purely technological challenge, energy democracy identifies the renewable energy transition as an opportunity to redistribute political and economic power toward egalitarian ends.

Energy democracy has been endorsed by community organizations, think tanks, labor unions, and NGOs as a framework for decarbonization. Energy Democracy began in western Europe between 2000 and 2010 and has become a worldwide practice and point of reference except Asia. The concept is also associated with a number of campaigns in Europe and North America calling for the municipalization of energy companies and democratization of their governance structures.

In the United States, the term "energy democracy" has become more widespread as calls for it greatly increased in the 2010s. In 2017 a NSF-funded Energy Democracy Symposium at the University of Utah assembled scholars and practitioners to formalize an interdisciplinary research agenda for the field, helping to consolidate energy democracy as a distinct area of scholarly research. The number of publications on energy democracy peaked in the U.S. in 2018, which can be correlated to growing social demand. This social demand was driven by the expanding environmental justice movement, and grassroots organizing by frontline communities. Despite growing awareness of the term, the United States has been seen as lagging behind many European countries in establishing more democratic energy structures due to its often top-down strategies. As of 2017 investor owned utilities served approximately 72 percent of U.S. electricity holders, leaving limited space for community and municipal ownership that is central to energy democracy.

== Principles ==
The exact definition of energy democracy is contested and the term is used to refer to a diverse set of proposals, practices, and ideas. However, advocates most often define energy democracy as embodying progressive principles they believe should guide contemporary energy policy and governance— namely social ownership, public participation, decentralization, and source information.

=== Social ownership ===
Advocates of energy democracy support a transition toward social ownership of energy companies and infrastructure, arguing that existing privately owned utilities are poorly suited to undertake rapid decarbonization and address concerns of environmental justice. The call for social ownership encompasses both expansions of public ownership (i.e. municipalization and nationalization) and the promotion of forms of collective ownership (e.g. energy cooperatives, energy community).

=== Public participation ===
Energy democracy calls for expanding public participation in the renewable energy transition and the broader functionings of the energy sector. In doing so, advocates argue that energy policy and decision-making will better incorporate local knowledge and the environmental justice concerns of local communities. Various mechanisms for public participation have been suggested, including the creation of democratically elected energy oversight boards and the incorporation of public deliberation into the policymaking process. Globally, end user communities of community renewable energy projects are expressing a desire for increased participation and ownership, while engineers and project managers outside of a community tend to want to preserve the status quo. The need for a democratic transition in energy ownership arises from this discrepancy, as end users—"energy citizens"—of energy transitions are often underrepresented.

=== Decentralization ===
Solar panels, wind turbines, and other renewable energy technologies allow for energy generation to be physically decentralized; advocates of energy democracy believe this energy decentralization could be a tool for empowering local communities and deconcentrating wealth and power. By building and managing energy infrastructure at the community-scale (e.g. community wind and solar farms), communities avoid having to outsource energy generation to privately owned utilities with regional monopolies. Additionally, advocates argue that decentralization can change community-wide relationships with energy consumption by turning community members into prosumers with a direct stake in questions of production.

== Campaigns and initiatives ==
In the early 2000s, the city of Hamburg Germany privatized its electricity, gas, and district heating distribution grid to multinational energy companies Vattenfall and E.ON. In response, a broad coalition of environmental, civil society and religious organizations formed the initiative Unser Hamburg - Unser Netz (Our Hamburg - Our Grid). The coalition campaigned for a referendum to return the grid to public ownership, and in 2013 50.9 percent of Hamburg voters were in favor of remunicipalization of all three grids.

In 2012, a global coalition of trade unionists founded Trade Unions for Energy Democracy to organize workers in support of climate action and a just transition to renewable energy. As of 2021, the network claims a membership of 89 trade union bodies in 26 countries.

The Energy Democracy Project was formed in 2020, bringing together over 30 diverse frontline organizations within the United States to build both community-level ownership of clean energy resources whilst promoting racial and economic equity of the energy transition.

In 2021, the New York Energy Democracy Alliance joined other state advocacy organizations in forming the Public Power NY Coalition. The coalition is currently advocating for the passage of the New York Utility Democracy Act (S.B. S7243), which would municipalize the New York's private utility companies and create democratically elected utility boards to oversee their operations.

== Critiques ==
Central critiques to the concept of energy justice center around equitable citizen participation and involvement when other more broad structural barriers to participation are left unaddressed. While many conceptualizations of energy democracy incorporate themes of social inclusion, this inclusion is often left undefined and becomes problematized in conceptualizations of energy democracy. Additionally, energy democracy literature has been criticized for its failure to address consideration of energy poverty and distributional injustices.

Energy democracy theorists are also often skeptical about the true democratic potential of traditional forms of governance, with many believing that new forms of ownership beyond enhanced voice are needed for the achievement of both energy democracy and energy justice.

== See also ==
- Community solar farm
- Community wind energy
- Economic democracy
- RAPS
- Soft energy path
- Wadebridge Renewable Energy Network
