= Low-carbon economy =

Climate-friendly economy

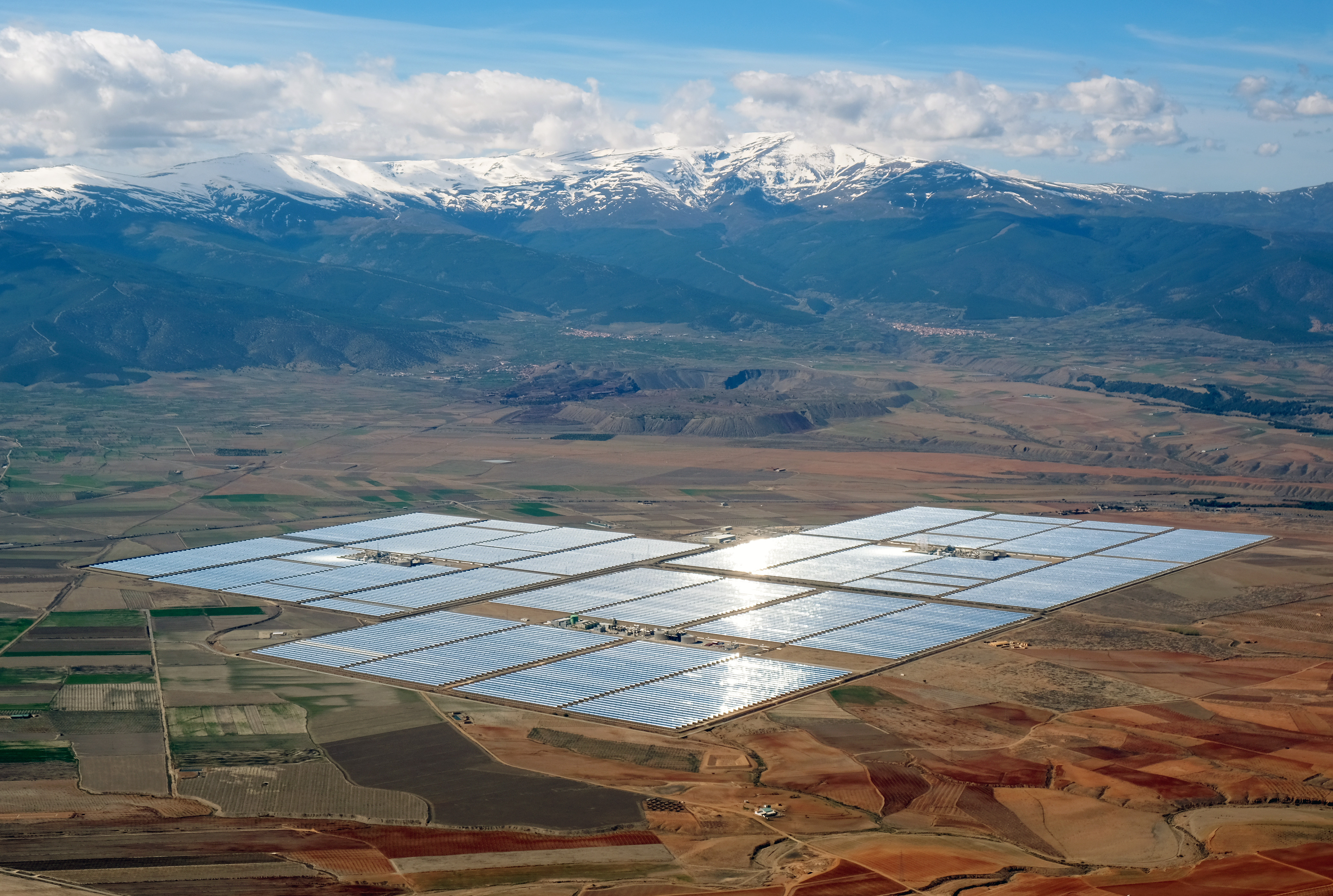
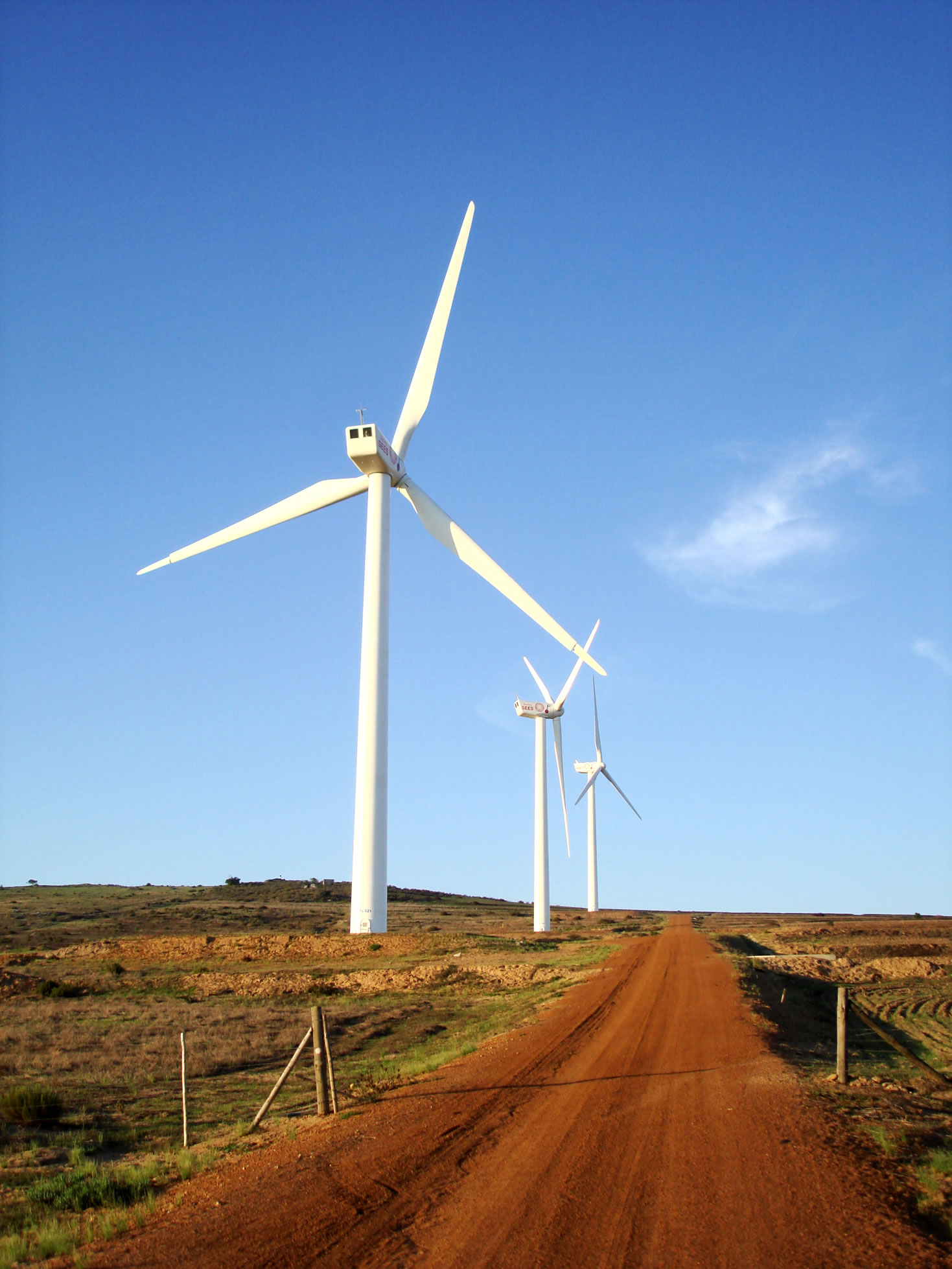
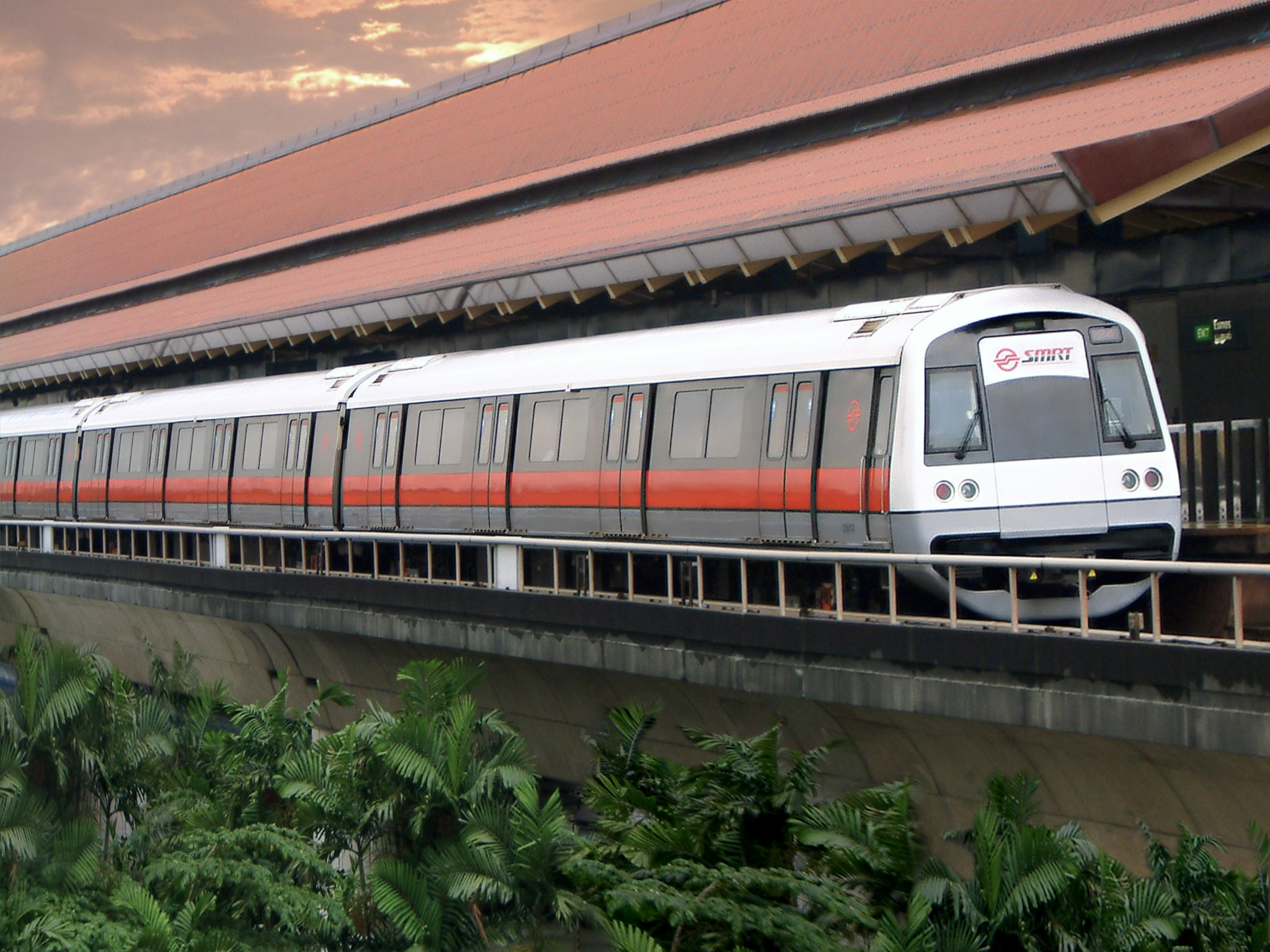
Examples for methods to transition towards a low-carbon economy: Concentrated solar power with molten salt heat storage in Spain; wind energy in South Africa; electrified public transport in Singapore; and renewable energy sources, especially solar photovoltaic and wind, are providing an increasing share of electricity production.

A low-carbon economy is an economy which absorbs as much greenhouse gas as it emits. Greenhouse gas (GHG) emissions due to human activity are the dominant cause of observed climate change since the mid-20th century. There are many proven approaches for moving to a low-carbon economy, such as encouraging renewable energy transition, energy conservation, and electrification of transportation (e.g. electric vehicles). An example are zero-carbon cities.

Shifting from high-carbon economies to low-carbon economies on a global scale could bring substantial benefits for all countries. It would also contribute to climate change mitigation.

== Definition and terminology ==
There are many synonyms or similar terms in use for low-carbon economy which stress different aspects of the concept, for example: green economy, sustainable economy, carbon-neutral economy, low-emissions economy, climate-friendly economy, decarbonised economy.

The term carbon in low-carbon economy is short hand for all greenhouse gases.

The UK Office for National Statistics published the following definition in 2017: "The low carbon economy is defined as economic activities that deliver goods and services that generate significantly lower emissions of greenhouse gases; predominantly carbon dioxide."

== Rationale and aims ==
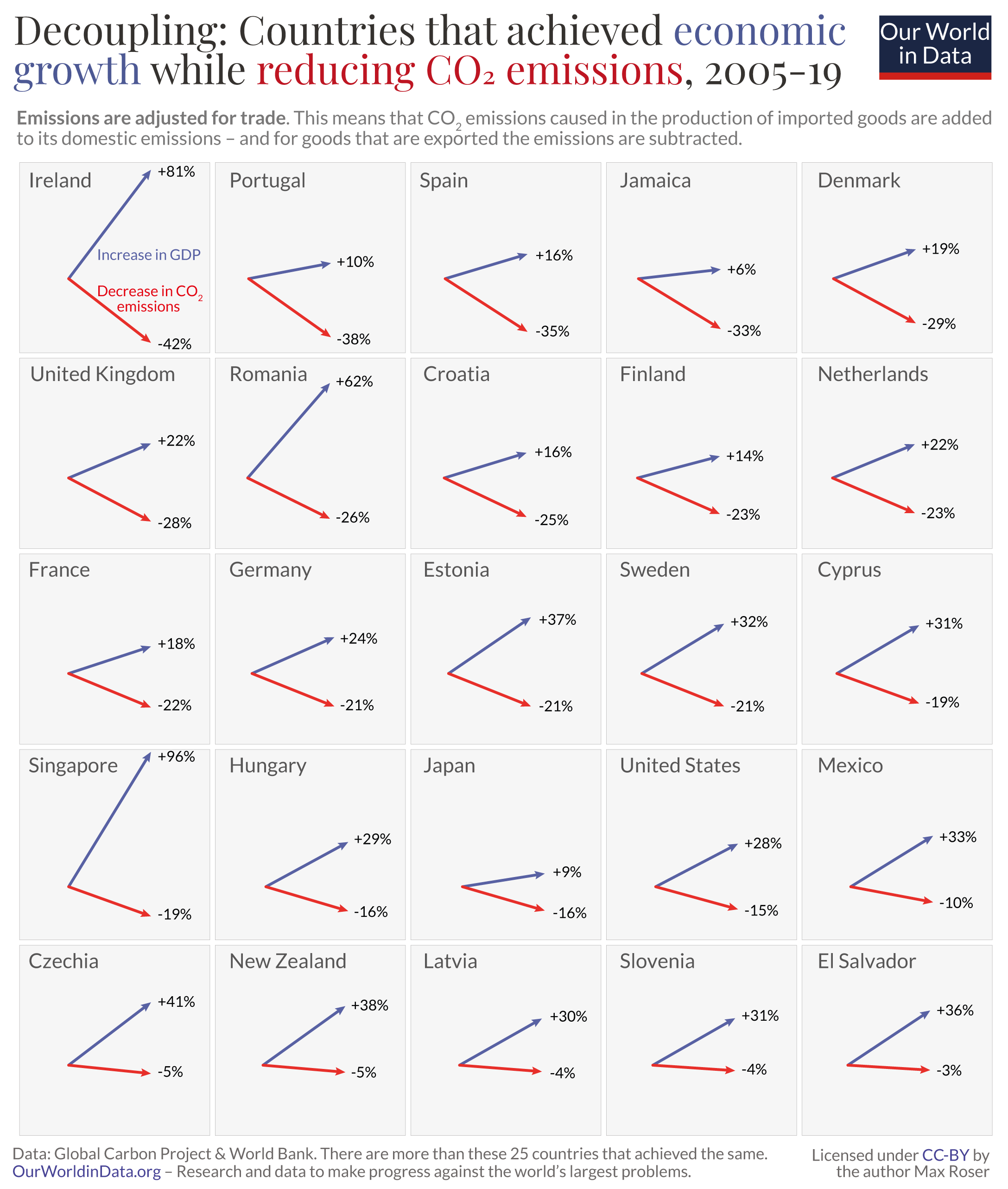
Countries that managed to reduce their greenhouse gas emissions (working towards a low-carbon economy) while still growing their economy. This is called eco-economic decoupling.

GHG emissions due to human activity are the dominant cause of observed climate change since the mid-20th century. Continued emission of greenhouse gases will cause long-lasting changes around the world, increasing the likelihood of severe, pervasive, and irreversible effects for people and ecosystems.

Nations may seek to become low-carbon or decarbonised economies as a part of a national climate change mitigation strategy. A comprehensive strategy to mitigate climate change is through carbon neutrality.

== Methods ==
Achieving a low-carbon economy involves reducing greenhouse gas emissions in all sectors that produce greenhouse gases, for example energy, transportation, industry, and agriculture. The literature often speaks of a transition from a high-carbon economy to a low-carbon economy. This transition should take place in a just manner (this is termed just transition).

There are many strategies and approaches for moving to a low-carbon economy, such as encouraging renewable energy transition, efficient energy use, energy conservation, electric vehicles, heat pumps, and climate-smart agriculture. This requires for example suitable energy policies, financial incentives (e.g. emissions trading, carbon tax), individual action on climate change, business action on climate change.

=== Actions taken by countries ===
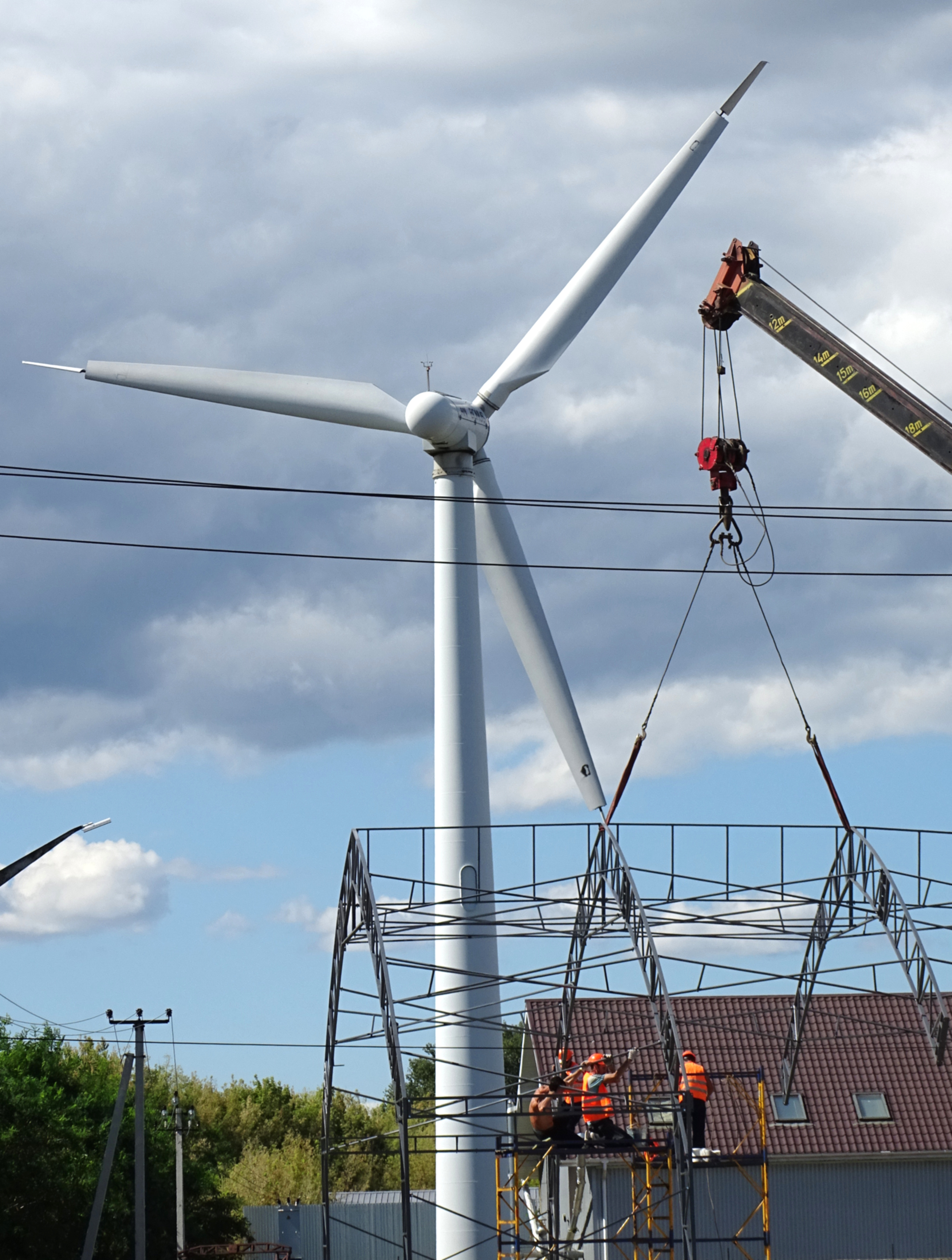
Wind Turbine with workers in Boryspil, Ukraine

On the international scene, the most prominent early step in the direction of a low-carbon economy was the signing of the Kyoto Protocol, which came into force in 2005, under which most industrialized countries committed to reduce their carbon emissions.

OECD countries could learn from each other and follow the examples of these countries in these sectors: Switzerland for their energy sector, UK for their industry, Netherlands for their transport sector, South Korea for their agriculture, and Sweden for their building sector.

== Co-benefits ==
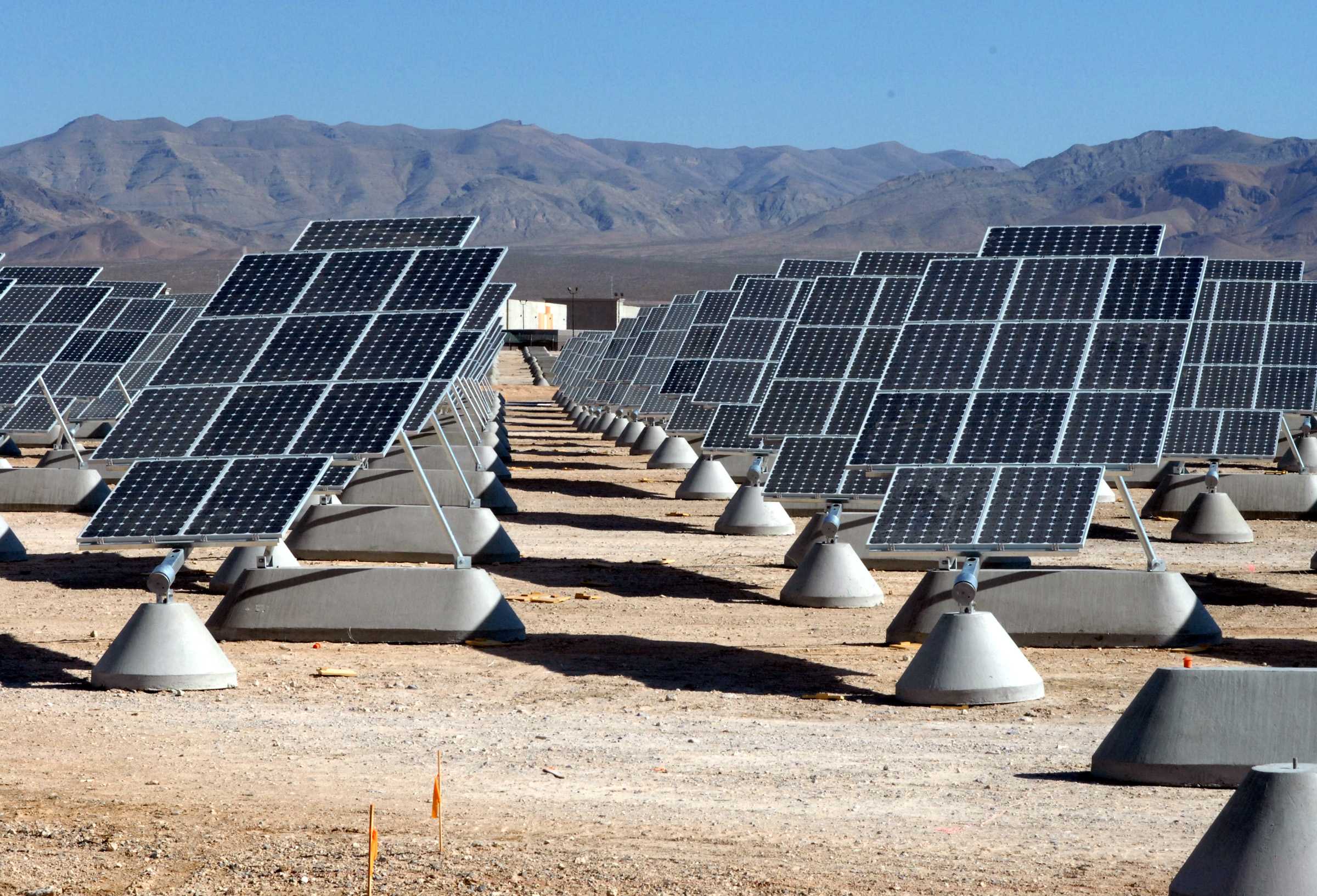
Solar array at Nellis Solar Power Plant. These panels track the sun in one axis.

The main benefit of a transition to low-carbon economies is that it would contribute towards climate change mitigation. Apart from that, other co-benefits can also be identified: Low-carbon economies present multiple benefits to ecosystem resilience, trade, employment, health, energy security, and industrial competitiveness.

During the green transition, workers in carbon-intensive industries are more likely to lose their jobs. The transition to a carbon-neutral economy will put more jobs at danger in regions with higher percentages of employment in carbon-intensive industries. Employment opportunities by the green transition are associated with the use of renewable energy sources or building activity for infrastructure improvements and renovations.

Low emission industrial development and resource efficiency can offer many opportunities to increase the competitiveness of economies and companies. According to the Low Emission Development Strategies Global Partnership (LEDS GP), there is often a clear business case for switching to lower emission technologies, with payback periods ranging largely from 0.5–5 years, leveraging financial investment.

== Energy aspects ==
=== Low-carbon electricity ===
Share of primary energy from low-carbon sources, 2018

Low-carbon electricity or low-carbon power is electricity produced with substantially lower greenhouse gas emissions over the entire lifecycle than power generation using fossil fuels. The energy transition to low-carbon power is one of the most important actions required to limit climate change.

Low carbon power generation sources include wind power, solar power, nuclear power and most hydropower. The term largely excludes conventional fossil fuel plant sources, and is only used to describe a particular subset of operating fossil fuel power systems, specifically, those that are successfully coupled with a flue gas carbon capture and storage (CCS) system. Globally almost 40% of electricity generation came from low-carbon sources in 2020: about 10% being nuclear power, almost 10% wind and solar, and around 20% hydropower and other renewables. Very little low-carbon power comes from fossil sources, mostly due to the cost of CCS technology.

==== Nuclear power ====
As of 2021, the expansion of nuclear energy as a method of achieving a low-carbon economy has varying degrees of support. Agencies and organizations that believe decarbonization is not possible without some nuclear power expansion include the United Nations Economic Commission for Europe, the International Energy Agency (IEA), and the International Atomic Energy Agency. The IEA believes that widespread decarbonization must occur by 2040 in order mitigate the adverse effects of climate change and that nuclear power must play a role.

=== Energy transition ===
Progress of current energy transition to renewable energy: Fossil fuels such as coal, oil, and natural gas still remain the world's primary energy sources, even as renewables are increasing in use.

An energy transition (or energy system transformation) is a major structural change to energy supply and consumption in an energy system. Currently, a transition to sustainable energy is underway to limit climate change. Most of the sustainable energy is renewable energy. Therefore, another term for energy transition is renewable energy transition. The current transition aims to reduce greenhouse gas emissions from energy quickly and sustainably, mostly by phasing-down fossil fuels and changing as many processes as possible to operate on low carbon electricity. A previous energy transition perhaps took place during the Industrial Revolution from 1760 onwards, from wood and other biomass to coal, followed by oil and later natural gas.

Over three-quarters of the world's energy needs are met by burning fossil fuels, but this usage emits greenhouse gases. Energy production and consumption are responsible for most human-caused greenhouse gas emissions. To meet the goals of the 2015 Paris Agreement on climate change, emissions must be reduced as soon as possible and reach net-zero by mid-century. Since the late 2010s, the renewable energy transition has also been driven by the rapidly falling cost of both solar and wind power. After 2024, clean energy is cheaper than ever. Global solar module prices fell 35 percent to less than 9 cents/kWh. EV batteries saw their best price decline in seven years. Another benefit of the energy transition is its potential to reduce the health and environmental impacts of the energy industry.

Heating of buildings is being electrified, with heat pumps being the most efficient technology by far. To improve the flexibility of electrical grids, the installation of energy storage and super grids are vital to enable the use of variable, weather-dependent technologies. However fossil-fuel subsidies are slowing the energy transition.

Energy transitions have varied environmental and social effects, as they can create both burdens and benefits for different communities. Concepts such as energy justice and energy democracy emphasise the importance of equitable distribution of energy costs and benefits, inclusive decision-making processes, and the recognition of historically marginalised groups in energy transitions.

=== Indices for comparison ===
The GeGaLo index of geopolitical gains and losses assesses how the geopolitical position of 156 countries may change if the world fully transitions to renewable energy resources. Former fossil fuel exporters are expected to lose power, while the positions of former fossil fuel importers and countries rich in renewable energy resources is expected to strengthen.

== See also ==
- Carbon footprint – Concept for greenhouse gas emissions analysis
- Eco-economic decoupling – Concept for economic growth without environmental damage
- Emission intensity – Emission rate of a pollutant
- Fossil fuel phase-out – Gradual reduction of the use and production of fossil fuels
- Low-carbon diet – Diet to reduce greenhouse gas emissions
- Low-carbon electricity – Power produced with lower carbon dioxide emissions
