= Susan Krumdieck =

New Zealand engineering academic

Susan Krumdieck MNZM
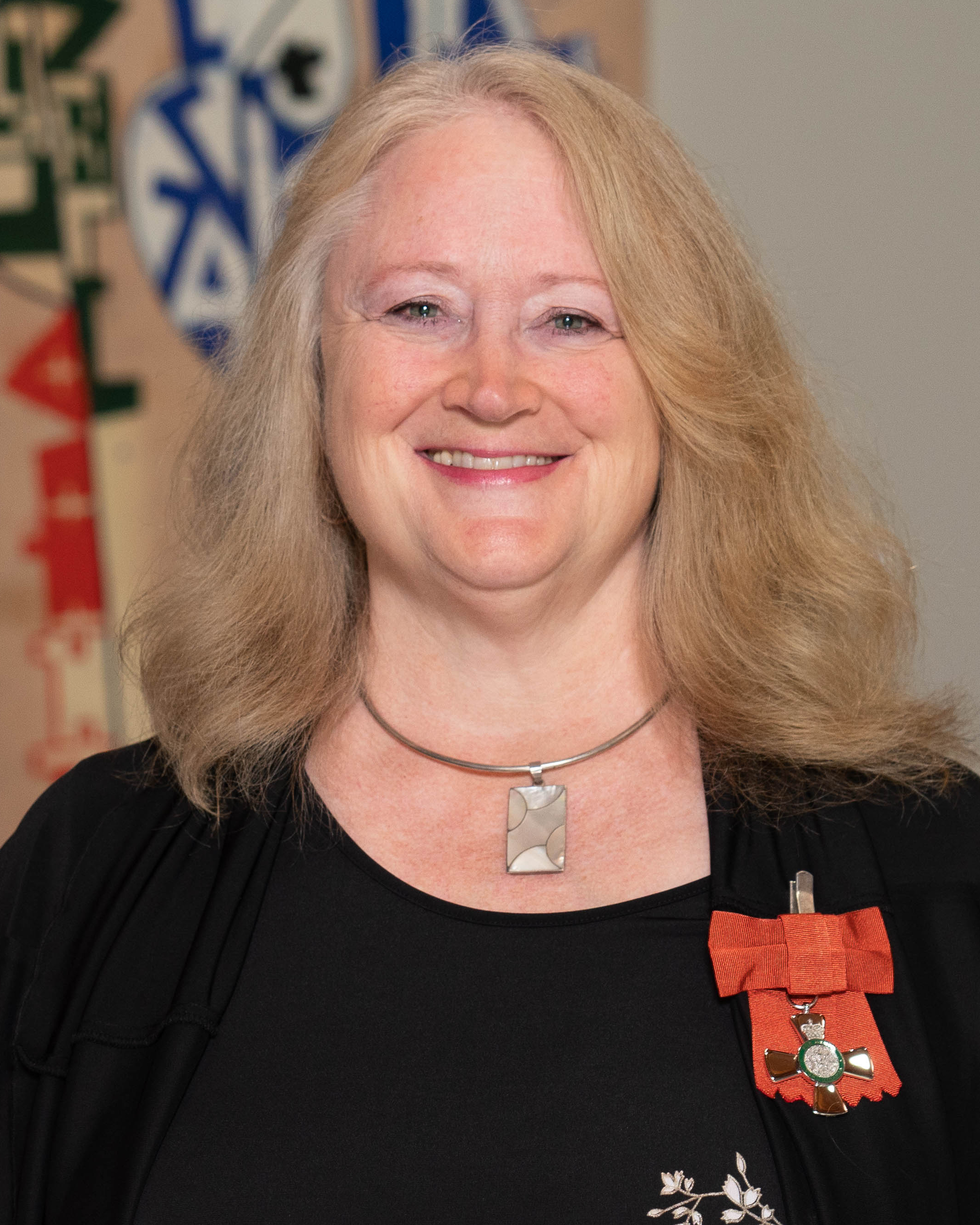
- Krumdieck in 2021
- Education: University of Colorado Boulder
- Scientific career
- Fields: Transition Engineering, Energy Transition, anti-microbial coatings
- Workplaces: University of Canterbury
- Thesis: Experimental characterization and modeling for the growth rate of oxide coatings from liquid solutions of metalorganic precursors by ultrasonic pulsed injection in a cold wall low pressure reactor (1999)

Susan Pran Krumdieck MNZM is a New Zealand engineering academic. She was an academic from 2000 to 2020, and the first woman appointed to full professor in engineering in 2014 at the University of Canterbury. She is currently Professor and Chair in Energy Transition at Heriot-Watt University.

== Academic career ==
After a PhD titled 'Experimental characterization and modeling for the growth rate of oxide coatings from liquid solutions of metalorganic precursors by ultrasonic pulsed injection in a cold wall low pressure reactor' at the University of Colorado, she moved to the University of Canterbury, rising to full professor. She continues her research work on titanium dioxide (TiO_{2}). One of her PhD students, when experimenting with TiO_{2}, created a black TiO_{2} coating. Initially regarded as an undesirable outcome, it was later discovered that this new coating had anti-microbial properties under normal light.

She teaches and researches in the field of energy transition engineering.

In the 2021 New Year Honours, Krumdieck was appointed an honorary Member of the New Zealand Order of Merit, for services to sustainability research and engineering.

== Other ==
From 2018 onwards, Krumdieck has been a member of the Upper North Island Supply Chain Strategy (UNISCS) working group. The group has been investigating ports in the upper half of the North Island, coastal shipping and port supply chains. One of the issues they consider is whether to reopen part of the North Auckland Line and build a new branch line, Marsden Point Branch, to connect to Northport.

== Selected works ==
- Blair, Niebert, Pons, Dirk, and Krumdieck, Susan (2019). Electrification in remote communities: Assessing the value of electricity using a community action research approach in Kabakaburi, Guyana. Sustainability, 11(9), page 2566.
- Gyamfi, Samuel, Susan Krumdieck, and Tania Urmee. "Residential peak electricity demand response—Highlights of some behavioural issues." Renewable and Sustainable Energy Reviews 25 (2013): pages 71–77.
- Kreith, Frank, and Susan Krumdieck. Principles of sustainable energy systems. Crc Press, 2013.
- Krumdieck, Susan; Boichot, Raphaël; Gorthy, Rukmini (2019). "Nanostructured TiO2 anatase-rutile-carbon solid coating with visible light antimicrobial activity". Scientific Reports. 9 (1): 1883. Bibcode:2019NatSR...9.1883K. doi:10.1038/s41598-018-38291-y. PMC 6374394. PMID 30760788.
- Gyamfi, Samuel, and Susan Krumdieck. "Price, environment and security: Exploring multi-modal motivation in voluntary residential peak demand response." Energy Policy 39, no. 5 (2011): pages 2993–3004.
- Krumdieck, Susan, Shannon Page, and André Dantas. "Urban form and long-term fuel supply decline: A method to investigate the peak oil risks to essential activities." Transportation Research Part A: Policy and Practice 44, no. 5 (2010): pages 306–322.
- Gyamfi, Samuel, and Susan Krumdieck. "Scenario analysis of residential demand response at network peak periods." Electric Power Systems Research 93 (2012): pages 32–38.
- Krumdieck, S. Transition engineering: Building a sustainable future. CRC Press, 2020.
