= Learning effect (economics) =

In economics, the learning effect is the process by which education increases productivity and results in higher wages.
