= Energy justice =

Energy justice is an interdisciplinary concept within the fields of energy policy, environmental justice, and sustainable development that examines the ethical dimensions of energy production, distribution, and consumption. It seeks to ensure the equitable distribution of the benefits and burdens associated with energy systems across different social groups, geographic regions, and generations.

Energy justice frameworks are increasingly applied in the context of global energy transition and climate change mitigation to address inequalities in access to affordable, reliable, and clean energy services. The concept integrates principles of social and economic justice, environmental justice and the just transition into energy decision-making processes and highlights the need for inclusive governance in energy infrastructure development.

== Energy justice cycle ==
Researchers have outlined an energy justice cycle with three concentric rings. The outer ring that represents energy activities, the middle ring represents the rights of humans that are suggested to be protected from energy activities, and the final ring focus on the 5 key forms of justice across the energy sector. The outer ring demonstrates a life cycle of the energy system with starting with extraction of resources necessary for supply, the production of energy, operation and supply which refers to the disbursement of energy, consumption and then finally decommissioning and waste management.

The human rights element reference in the energy justice circle refers to essential concepts such as clean water or air, health, subsistence, a safe environment, culture, dignity, property, fair trails, security and culture. The innermost circle looks at key forms of justice tied energy systems suggesting principles such as distributive, procedural, restorative, recognition and cosmopolitan justice.

This cycle aims to demonstrate how legal systems and courts can apply these elements of justice as a potential way to protect human rights as disputes arise across the different stages of the energy life cycle.

== Environmental justice ==
Some researchers have suggested that integrating energy justice with climate justice and environmental justice under a common framework can improve policy outcomes during low-carbon transitions by addressing social, environmental and economic impacts simultaneously.

== Conceptual framework ==
Energy justice comprises three main tenets: distributive, recognition, and procedural justice. Distributive justice addresses where injustices emerge, recognition justice evaluates who is ignored in the transition, and procedural justice assesses the fairness of the processes involved in the transition.

In addition to procedural, distributive and recognition justice, some scholars have proposed that restorative justice and cosmopolitan justice should also be incorporated into energy justice frameworks to better account for international inequalities and environmental harms associated with fossil fuel-based energy systems. Other work suggests further integration of five categories of normative assumptions: principles of justice, the scale of justice considered, the subjects to whom the principles apply, the body of knowledge assumed, and the time frame. Their integration into the conceptual framework aims to address the normative uncertainty.

== Applications ==
Energy justice considerations may be particularly significant in petrostates, where national economies are strongly dependent on fossil fuel revenues and where energy transitions may generate macroeconomic risks and distributional inequalities at the national level.

== Criticism and limitations ==
Critics argue that energy justice may lack conceptual clarity due to its interdisciplinary nature and normative foundations. Others contend that operationalizing justice-based frameworks in energy policymaking remains challenging due to competing policy objectives and institutional constraints.
