= Transition engineering =

Transition engineering is the professional-engineering discipline that deals with the application of the principles of science to the design, innovation and adaptation of engineered systems that meet the needs of today without compromising the ecological, societal and economic systems on which future generations will depend to meet their own needs. Today safety is an expected consideration in design, operation and end use. Transition Engineering aims for a similar consideration of sustainability. Transition engineering is a trans-disciplinary field that addresses wicked problems while creating opportunities to increase resilience and adaptation through change projects.

== Overview ==
Engineering professions emerge when new technologies, new problems or new opportunities arise. This was the case when safety engineering grew in the early 1900s to combat the high workplace injury and fatality rates. In the 1960s, Environmental engineering emerged as a discipline to reduce industrial pollution and mitigate impacts on environmental health and water quality. Quality engineering came about with the increase in mass production techniques during WWII and the need to confirm the quality of the products. When engineered systems must change, either due to failure risks, obsolescence or modernisation, change management is a well-known process. Transition Engineering is focused on identifying the unsustainable aspects of currently operational engineered systems, innovating the projects that down-shift the unsustainable energy, material, environmental and social aspects, and then carrying out an inclusive change management process.

There are two serious problems driving the emergence of Transition Engineering; the exponential growth in the concentration of carbon dioxide in Earth’s atmosphere and the lack of growth and imminent decline of conventional oil production sometimes characterised as peak oil. The concentration of carbon dioxide in the atmosphere ran past the "climate safe" 350 ppm range in the 1990s, and has now exceeded 420ppm, a level that Earth has not known for 800,000 years. Transition engineering aims to take advantage of the current access to the remaining lower cost and higher EROI energy resources to re-develop all aspects of urban and industrial engineered systems to adapt as fossil fuel use is dramatically reduced.

== Emerging Pan-Disciplinary Field ==
Recognition of the field of Transition Engineering and Energy Transition Engineering started in 2010 when the Institution of Engineering and Technology (IET) Prestige Lecture in NZ was given by Associate Professor Susan Krumdieck, University of Canterbury.

In 2014 the engineering text book, "Principles of Sustainable Energy Systems" by Professor Frank Kreith, featured Chapter 13 on Transition Engineering. In 2017, Transition Engineering was invited for Chapter 32 the book "Energy Solutions to Combat Global Warming". In 2019, a full text on the methodologies and principles of transition engineering was published, "Transition Engineering, Building a Sustainable Future".

Since 2015, Transition Engineering has been taught at the university level in a range of full courses, workshops, guest lectures and seminars. Courses have been held in Grenoble INP, France; Munich University of Applied Sciences, Germany; University of Duisburg-Essen, Germany; University of Bristol, UK; at University of Canterbury, New Zealand, and Heriot-Watt University, Scotland. In 2020 the first on-line courses were offered continuing professional development for engineers and other professionals.

== Origins ==
The idea behind transition engineering originated from many different roots, both technical and non-technical. The concept of sustainable development has been around since 1987 and the problem of sustainability was a driving force in the development of transition engineering. The Transition Town movement provided further inspiration as it showed that there were many groups of people around the world motivated to prepare for peak oil and climate change. Transition towns and ecovillages demonstrate the need for engineers to build systems that manage un-sustainable risks and provide people with sustainable options. Engineers are ethically required to "hold paramount the safety, health and welfare of the public" and answer society's need for sustainable development

The origins of safety engineering provided much of the inspiration for transition engineering. At the beginning of the 1900s, business owners viewed workplace safety as a wasted investment and politicians were slow to change. After the Triangle Shirtwaist Factory fire in New York City killed 156 trapped workers, 62 engineers came together to investigate how to make the workplace a safer place to be. This eventually lead to the formation of the American Society of Safety Engineers.

As safety engineering manages the risks of unsafe conditions, transition engineering manages the risks of unsustainable conditions. To give engineers a better grasp of sustainability, transition engineering defines the problem as UN-sustainability. This is similar to the problem of un-safe conditions that is the purpose of safety engineering. We do not necessarily know what a perfectly safe system looks like, but we do know what unsafe systems look like and how to improve them; the same applies to unsustainability of systems. By reducing unsustainability issues we take steps in the right direction

== The Seven Step Method ==
The Transition Engineering method involves seven steps to help engineers develop projects to deal with changing unsustainable activities. As a discipline, Transition Engineering recognizes that "Business as Usual" projections of future scenarios from past trends are not valid because the underlying conditions have changed sufficiently from the conditions of the past. For example, the projection of future oil supply in 2050 from data prior to 2005 would give an expectation of a 50% increase in demand over that time-frame. However, the actual production rate of conventional oil has not increased since 2005 and is projected to decline by more than 50% by 2050.

1. History: First, historical data are gathered and historical trends understood in cultural and political contexts. All historical aspects of the system are considered. Transition Engineering investigates the effects that technology and social developments have on energy and resource demand. How did we get to where we are now? Why are we here? What factors put us here?
2. Present: This step assesses the current situation. All current capabilities, investments, assets and condition/age of the assets, and liabilities are considered. Energy use is audited and its end-use behavior is assessed
3. Future: Scenarios from all areas of study are considered to get a consensus view of both inertial trajectories of current trends, and limitations of carrying capacity and resource scarcity. Transition Engineers apply the science of climate change, petroleum geology, ecology, hydrology etc. to describe the "forward operating environment". Determining the probability of each future outcome creates a future operating environment envelope. This gives engineers and decision makers constraints with varying levels of risk.
4. Path Break Concepts: Innovation takes place in this step when current assumptions about behavior and economics are set aside in favor of consideration of the forward operating environment at the end-point of the time-frame of study. The TE innovator places him/herself in the future and uses the future design constraints to come up with realistic and workable concepts. The path-break concept is not futuring.
5. Backcasting: The path break concepts are analysed to see how they differ from the current situation. In this step, the barriers and strategies to change existing systems are also analysed
6. Trigger Events: Although existing systems carry a large amount of inertia, if the right trigger is applied at the right time, a great amount of change is possible. Triggers can be either disastrous events such as economic collapse, or external changes such as a corporate merger, new law, or new staff. They can also be engineered change projects. The trigger event for safety engineering was the “Triangle shirtwaist factory fire.” (reference) The challenge is to communicate the advantages and benefits of adaptive change, and to initiate a disruptive event that enables an organization to get out of the rut. See Change Management
7. Shift Projects: Finally, by planning for future supply and demand, change projects are realized to make best use of the current available resources. Through these projects, society will be more resilient to peak oil and climate change events.

== Global Association for Transition Engineering (GATE) ==
GATE opened the first group in the UK in Feb 2014. GATE is a Professional Engineering Institution; a membership association and learned society, and comprises an emerging network of engineers and non-engineers that share the idea that engineers are responsible for changing engineered systems in order to adapt to reducing fossil fuel and other unsustainable resources. Transition Engineering is a change management discipline. Like Safety Engineering, Transition Engineering uses and audit and stock-take of current system design and operation to quantify the risks to essential activities and resources over a time-frame of study. The time-frame of study should be commensurate with the lifetime of the assets involved in the activity. An activity is anything that the engineered system supports, for example manufacturing, sewage treatment, mobility, or food preservation. Transition Engineering recognizes that the analytical methods of strategic analysis over a life-cycle time-frame are at odds with most economic analyses that discount values with time. The strategic analysis carried out by Transition Engineers seeks to avoid stranded investment by recognizing resource risks. A classic example of stranded investments is the North Atlantic Cod Fishery – where the largest number of bottom trawling ships (e.g. those ships responsible for destroying the Cod spawning beds) were manufactured in the year that the fish stocks collapsed. The Global Association for Transition Engineering is registered charity number 1166048, registered with the UK Charity Commission on 14 March 2016. It is a "Charitable Incorporated Organisation" or CIO.

== Textbook: Transition Engineering, Building a Sustainable Future ==
Published in Nov 2019 by CRC Press, Taylor & Francis The textbook sets out the premise, processes, methods and tools of Transition Engineering. The book includes the perspective stories that Professor Susan Krumdieck has used for sensemaking around wicked problems of change to downshift fossil fuels. Professor Krumdieck was awarded Queens New Years Honours in 2021 with New Zealand Order of Merit for her research, teaching and publication of the book. The book is also popular with non-technical readers.

Transition Engineering, Building a Sustainable Future, Susan Krumdieck (2019) CRC Press, Taylor & Francis, Boca Raton

== See also ==
- Engineering design process
- Safety Engineering
- Sustainable transport
- Systems engineering
