= Just transition =

Labor movement idea emphasizing aid and green-collar jobs for fossil fuel workers

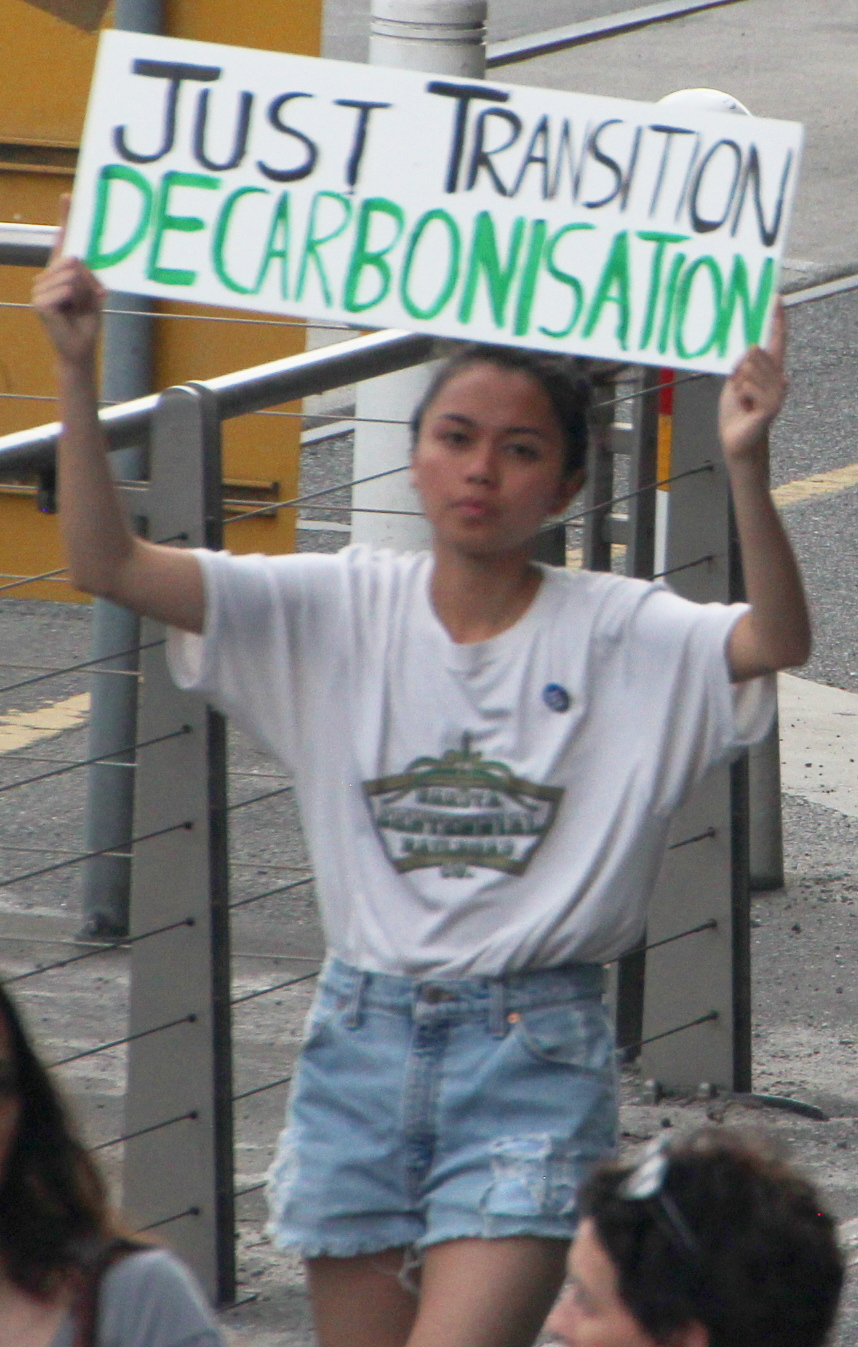
Protester in Melbourne calling for a just transition and decarbonisation

Just transition is a concept that emerged in the 1980s through efforts by U.S. trade unions to protect workers' rights and livelihoods as economies shift to sustainable production, primarily protecting workers affected by environmental regulations. Since then, it has evolved and gained global recognition, including having a place in the Paris Agreement in 2015. A just transition focuses on the connection between energy transition and equitable approaches to decarbonization that support broader development goals. A growing number of countries are incorporating just transition strategies to achieve ambitious climate goals, with 38% of 170 countries referring to just transition in their short-term climate plans as of 2022.

== Definition ==
While there is no universally accepted definition, a just transition generally requires the equitable treatment of people in the move to environmental sustainability and a post-carbon society. This concept involves moving towards a greener economy in a fair and equitable way, without placing countries or communities at disproportionate risks. The Intergovernmental Panel on Climate Change (IPCC) defines just transition as follows: "A set of principles, processes and practices that aim to ensure that no people, workers, places, sectors, countries or regions are left behind in the transition from a high-carbon to a low carbon economy". The IPCC outlines elements essential for a just transition focusing on equitable social and economic shifts to respond to climate change. These include investing in low-emission industries, evaluating social impacts, and creating fair and secure jobs in a greener world. The IPCC emphasizes equitable energy access, low-carbon economic diversification, gender equity, and international cooperation.

The United Nations Committee for Development Policy recommends recognizing historical responsibility and ensuring developed countries support developing nations in the shift to low-carbon economies to achieve a just transition. Key recommendations from the 2023 Committee for Development Policy Report include promoting developing countries' participation in clean technology value chains, co-developing technology with shared ownership, and securing affordable financing for sustainable infrastructure. A just transition requires increased funding for climate resilience, ecosystem services, and equitable transitions, as well as international cooperation to prevent the burden of climate action from falling on developing countries.

== History ==
In the 1980s, "in the United States, Tony Mazzocchi of the Oil, Chemical and Atomic Workers Union proposed a "Superfund for Workers", which would compensate and retrain those who moved out of environmentally hazardous jobs. It's widely believed that Mazzocchi was the first to use the term "just transition," and this superfund was meant to parallel the U.S. Superfund Act of 1980 – national legislation to tax corporations to clean up hazardous waste sites across the country".

== In policy ==
=== International policy ===
At the 2015 United Nations Climate Change Conference in Paris, France, or COP 21, unions and just transition advocates convinced the Parties to include language regarding just transition and the creation of decent work in the Paris Agreement's preamble.

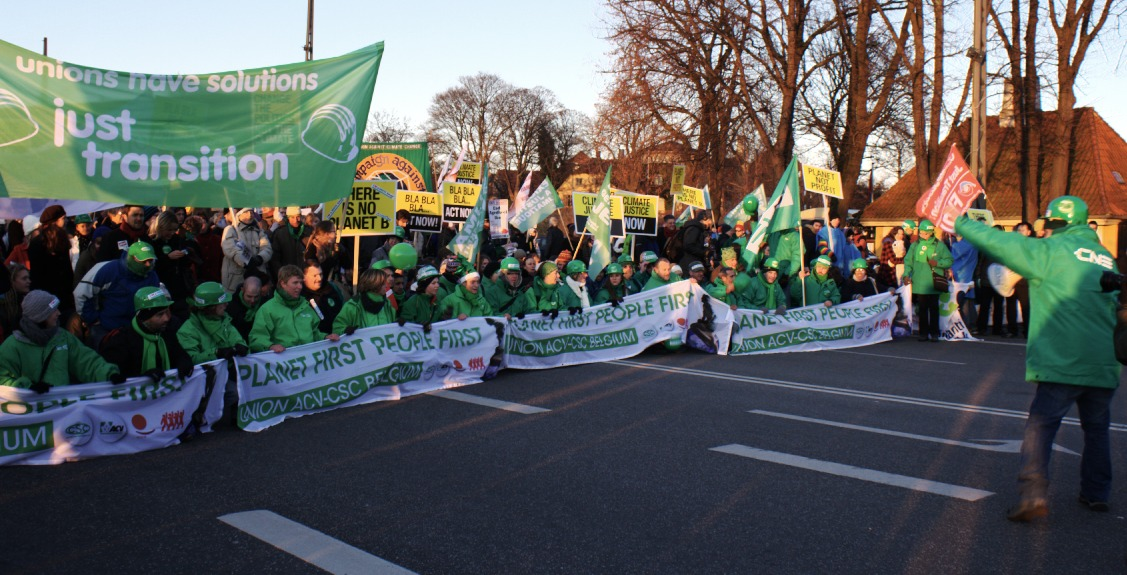
Copenhagen Climate Summit (2009) protesters advocating for unions in a just transition

At the 2018 United Nations Climate Change Conference in Katowice, Poland, or COP 24, the Heads of State and Government adopted the Solidarity and Just Transition Silesia Declaration, highlighting the importance of just transition as mentioned in the Paris Agreement, the ILO's Guidelines, and the United Nations 2030 Agenda for Sustainable Development. The Declaration encourages all relevant United Nations agencies to proceed with its implementation and consider the issue of just transition when drafting and implementing parties' nationally determined contributions, or NDCs.

At COP26, the European Investment Bank announced a set of Just Transition common principles agreed upon with multilateral development banks, which also align with the Paris Agreement. The principles refer to focusing financing on the transition to net zero carbon economies, while keeping socioeconomic effects in mind, along with policy engagement and plans for inclusion and gender equality, all aiming to deliver long-term economic transformation.

The African Development Bank, Asian Development Bank, Islamic Development Bank, Council of Europe Development Bank, Asian Infrastructure Investment Bank, European Bank for Reconstruction and Development, New Development Bank, and Inter-American Development Bank are among the multilateral development banks that have vowed to uphold the principles of climate change mitigation and a Just Transition. The World Bank Group also contributed.

In 2021, South Africa signed at COP26 the South Africa Just Energy Transition Investment Plan (JET-IP), a $8.5bn deal to help South Africa decarbonise its economy.

In 2022, two countries - Indonesia and Vietnam - were invited to take part in a Just Energy Transition Partnership (JETP) framework which aims at mobilizing more than USD 35 billion of public and private financing to support a just energy transition in the two countries.

Nationally determined contributions (NDCs) are climate action plans that countries develop and submit under the Paris Agreement, outlining how they plan to adapt to climate change and reduce their greenhouse gas emissions. As of 31 October 2022, 65 countries and territories refer to "just transition" in their NDCs, 29 countries refer to "just transition" in their Long-Term (mitigation) Strategies (LTS), and 24 countries refer to "just transition" in both their NDCs and LTS. Just transition principles are mentioned in 38% of nationally determined contributions and 56% of long-term strategies. Of the NDCs that reference a just transition, there is no significant difference between whether the country is developed or developing.

=== Paris Agreement ===
The Paris Agreement represents 194 countries (as of 2022) commitment to a global framework to prevent the global temperature from exceeding 1.5 degrees Celsius. In the transitional state to a net-zero future, the United Nations Development Programme (UNDP) recommends countries use this opportunity to mitigate social inequality and civil unrest through a just transition.

The United Nations Development Programme establishes five ways a just transition can support the Paris Agreement: Including the public in decision-making processes, supporting a green jobs revolution, creating a resilient net-zero economy, developing local solutions, and concentrating efforts and manpower. The Paris Agreement focuses on a justice dimension to climate action within countries rather than on justice between nations.

==== Nationally Determined Contributions ====
Under the Paris Agreement, each country commits to a mechanism for implementing reductions in emissions, and other actions under the UNFCCC, called Nationally determined contribution. A review of NDCs by the World Resource Institute in April 2025 found that the number of NDCs with the "just transition" commitment increased from 1 in 2015 (South Africa) to 66 in April 2025. For example, in the Nationally Determined Contribution for Chile, the "social" pillar of action includes multiple elements of a just transition, including a focus on minimizing impact of the economic changes on marginalized groups, including a governance mechanism that includes trade unions and community members alongside government and companies.

=== European Union mechanism ===
In Europe, advocates for a just transition want to unite social and climate justice, for example, for coal workers in coal-dependent developing regions who lack employment opportunities beyond coal. In the European Union, the concerns facing workers in fossil fuel industries are addressed by the Just Transition mechanism in the European Green Deal. The funding and mechanism helps fossil fuel-dependent regions within the European Union to transition to a greener economy.

A just transition from coal is supported by the European Bank for Reconstruction and Development.

=== Climate litigation ===
A 2021 review of legal theories for climate litigation and a just transition, recommended using accountability litigation against companies in industries that would lose work.

== See also ==
- Low-carbon economy – Climate-friendly economy
