= Carbon Tracker =

UK Climate Change think tank

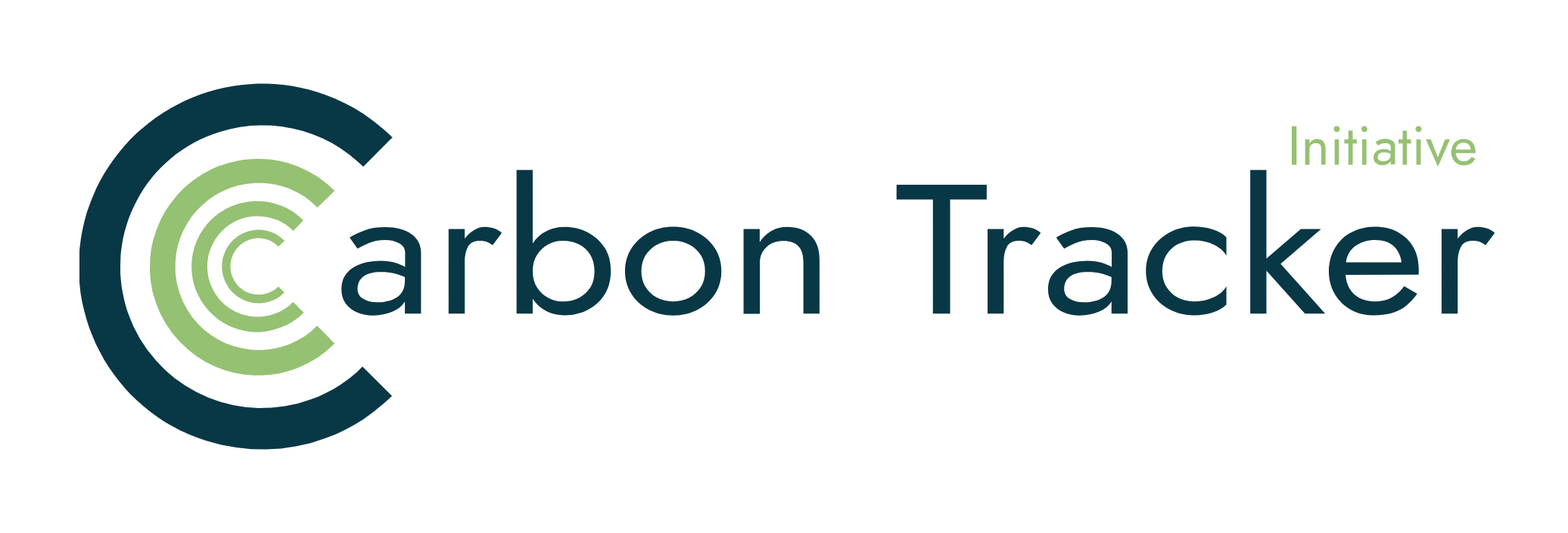
- Type: Non-profit financial think tank
- Headquarters: London, United Kingdom
- Website: carbontracker.org
- Formerly called: Carbon Tracker Initiative

Carbon Tracker is a London-based not-for-profit think tank researching the impact of climate change on financial markets.

Carbon Tracker popularized the notion of a carbon bubble, which describes the incompatibility between the continued development of fossil fuel projects and combating climate change.

Carbon Tracker's pioneering analysis laid the foundation for a broader understanding of how environmental overshoot creates systemic financial risks and where finance-aligned solutions are most needed. Building on this framework a sister organisation, Planet Tracker, was established in 2018 to apply similar principles to the world of nature and biodiversity focusing on “irreplaceable nature” - resources and production systems that cannot be exploited without breaching ecological limits.

== History and work ==
Carbon Tracker was founded by UK fund manager Mark Campanale, with Jeremy Leggett serving as chairman. The organisation's first two reports – Unburnable Carbon (2011) and Unburnable Carbon (2013) – argued that up to two-thirds of the world's known reserves and resources of oil, coal and gas could not be burned while avoiding dangerous levels of climate change. As summarized by Financial Times columnist Martin Wolf: "The conclusion is quite simple: burning known reserves of fossil fuels is incompatible with meeting the climate targets governments have set themselves."

The Paris Agreement, adopted internationally in December 2015, aims to keep the global average temperature rise below 2 °C of warming, to avoid and reduce some of the most severe risks and impacts of climate change. But this requires carbon dioxide levels emitted in the atmosphere by 2050 to not exceed a "carbon budget" of up to 900 gigatonnes. Drawing on research from the Potsdam Institute for Climate Impact Research, Carbon Tracker's reports showed that the world's reserves and resources of coal, oil and gas, if burned, would emit more than three times this amount: approximately 2800 gigatonnes. This raises the possibility that, by financing the development and production of fossil fuels that might never be consumed, investors are exposed to the risk of "stranded assets", rendered unprofitable by climate regulations and technological alternatives such as renewable energy. Reuters described this idea – that investors were financing a "carbon bubble" – as having become 'part of "the climate change lexicon"; it has formed the basis for warnings about "stranded assets" by Bank of England Governor Mark Carney and inspired groups like Norway's sovereign wealth fund to divest billions in fossil fuel holdings'.

Carbon Tracker's subsequent research investigated the implications of lower demand and low-carbon scenarios for the different fossil fuels of fossil fuels against lower demand, price and carbon emissions scenarios.

Mark Carney echoed Carbon Tracker's warning on stranded assets in a 2015 speech to London insurers. followed by the launch of a task force on climate-related financial disclosures under the auspices of the Financial Stability Board.

=== Reports ===
Carbon Tracker's reports include:

- Unburnable carbon – Are the world's financial markets carrying a bubble? (2011)
- Unburnable carbon 2013: Wasted capital and stranded assets (2013) (joint research with the Grantham Research Institute on Climate Change and the Environment at the London School of Economics)
- Carbon Supply Cost Curves series:
  - Carbon Supply Cost Curves: Evaluating Financial Risk to Oil Capital Expenditures (2014)
  - Carbon Supply Cost Curves: Evaluating Financial Risk to Coal Capital Expenditures (2014)
  - Carbon Supply Cost Curves: Evaluating Financial Risk to Gas Capital Expenditures (2015)
- Lost in Transition: How the energy sector is missing potential demand destruction (2015)
- The $2 Trillion Stranded Asset Danger Zone: How fossil fuel firms risk destroying investor returns (2015)
- Sense and Sensitivity: Maximising Value with a 2D Portfolio (2016)
- Expect the Unexpected: The Disruptive Power of Low-carbon Technology (2017) (joint research with the Grantham Institute - Climate Change and Environment at Imperial College)
- Apocoalypse now (2019)
- How to waste over half a trillion dollars (2020)
- Poland's energy dilemma: new gas power traps taxpayers in a costly future (2022)

== In the media ==
In 2012, a Rolling Stone article by writer and campaigner Bill McKibben presented Carbon Tracker's research on the carbon bubble to a wider audience The article led McKibben to start a campaign calling for fossil fuel divestment which, as of December 2015, saw organisations managing over $5.46 trillion committing to partial or total divestment.

Carbon Tracker's analysis has been cited by investment banks HSBC, Citi and JP Morgan, consultancies such as Accenture, and the Dutch Central Bank. It has also provoked a range of responses from major oil companies: ExxonMobil has stated it is 'confident that none of our hydrocarbon reserves are now or will become "stranded."' Chevron, while admitting that "certain high-cost assets around the world could be impacted by a hypothetical GHG-constrained case", has similarly argued that the risk of stranded assets is "manageable". Different positions have also been expressed by BP and Statoil.

According to the Carbon Tracker Initiative report in March 2020 wind farms and solar plants will soon be cheaper than running existing coal-fired power stations and coal power would struggle if markets were priced fairly.
