= Local government in Australia =

Third-level government in Australia

Local government is the third level of government in Australia, administered with limited autonomy under the states and territories, and in turn beneath the federal government. Local government is not mentioned in the Constitution of Australia, and two referendums in 1974 and 1988 to alter the Constitution relating to local government were unsuccessful. Every state and territory government recognises local government in its own respective constitution. Unlike the two-tier local government system in Canada or the United States, there is (largely) only one tier of local government in each Australian state/territory, with no distinction between cities or counties.

Local government in Australia is generally run by an elected council, and the area it administers is referred to by the Australian Bureau of Statistics as a local government area or LGA, each of which encompasses multiple suburbs and/or localities (roughly equivalent to neighbourhoods), often of different postcodes. LGAs are variously styled using terms such as "city", "town", "district", "municipality", "borough", "region" or "shire". These usually have geographic or historical significance, and there is rarely any legal distinction between them. For instance, cities and municipalities tend to apply to councils in urban and metropolitan areas, whereas districts and shires are found primarily in rural and regional areas. A local government area is also commonly known as a "city council", "local council", or simply a "council". Council members are generally known as councillors, and the head of a council is called the mayor, chairman or shire president. Some of Australia's largest cities, such as Sydney, Melbourne, Brisbane, Perth and Adelaide, use the historical title of lord mayor. Councillors are usually elected from single-member districts known as divisions or wards, whilst the mayor or president is directly elected by all the voters within that council area. However, the mayor is often entitled to style themselves as a councillor, and is considered an ex officio member of the council. As of August 2016, there were 547 local councils in Australia.

Despite the (largely) single tier of local governance in Australia, there are a number of vast, sparsely populated regions that are not part of any established LGA. Functions of local government in these unincorporated areas may be exercised by special-purpose governing bodies established outside of local legislation, as with Victoria's alpine resorts, or directly administered by state or territory governments, such as the entirety of the Australian Capital Territory. The administrative areas covered by local government bodies in Australia range from as small as 1.5 km^{2} (0.58 sq mi) for the Shire of Peppermint Grove in the Perth metropolitan region, to as large as 372,571 km^{2} (143,850 sq mi) for the Shire of East Pilbara in Western Australia's Pilbara region.

As an exception to the generalisation that Australian local government has only a single tier, New South Wales has county councils, which are special-purpose local authorities governing county districts composed of two or more LGAs, and are variously responsible for water supply, flood mitigation and weed management. Formerly, they also played a significant role in urban planning, electricity distribution, and some also operated abattoirs. By the 21st century, only a handful remain, with the majority of New South Wales LGAs no longer belonging to any county council. These councils are not to be confused with cadastral divisions also known as counties, which are largely obsolete but continue to exist by statute.

== Types of local government ==
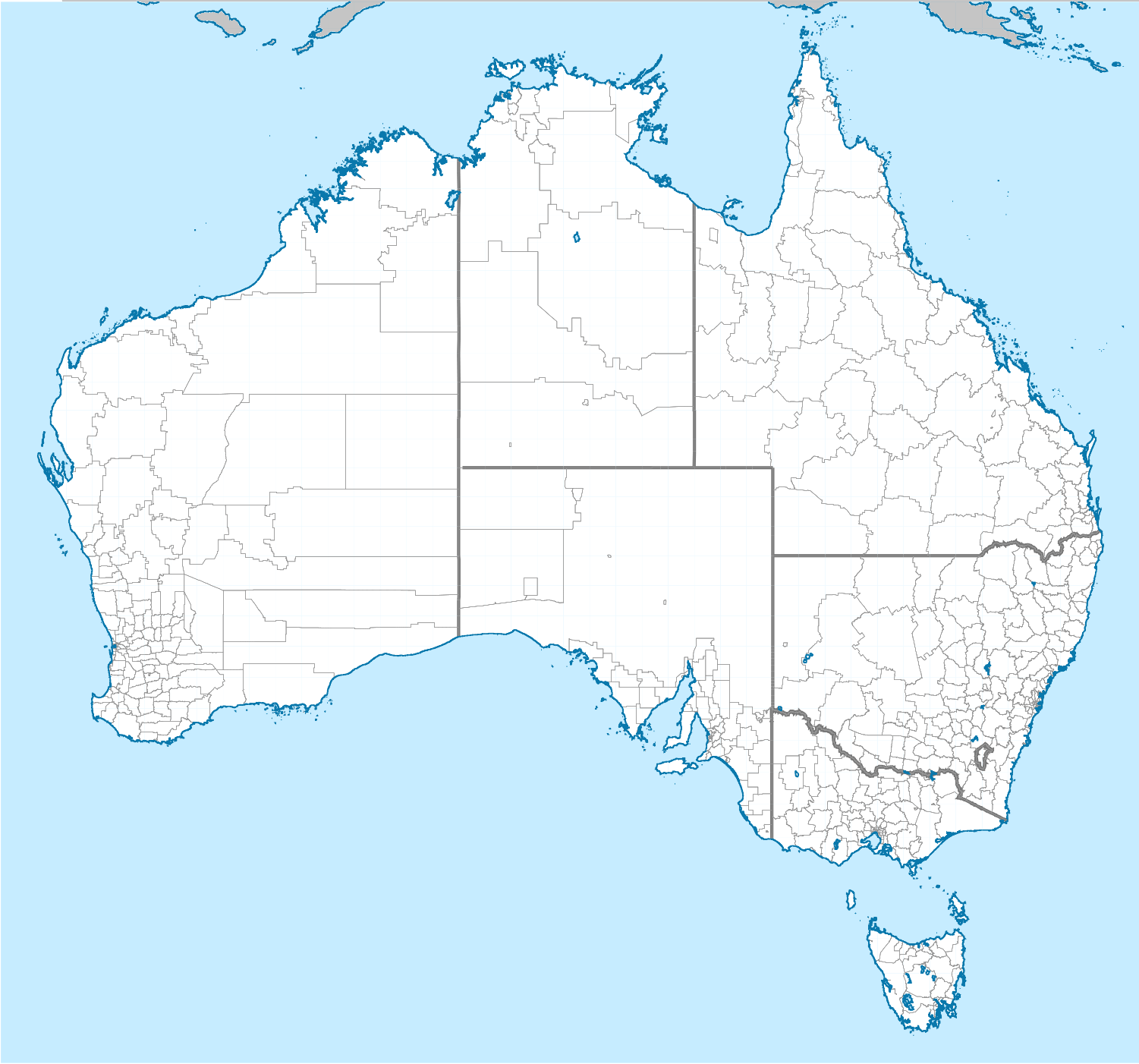
Local government areas in Australia

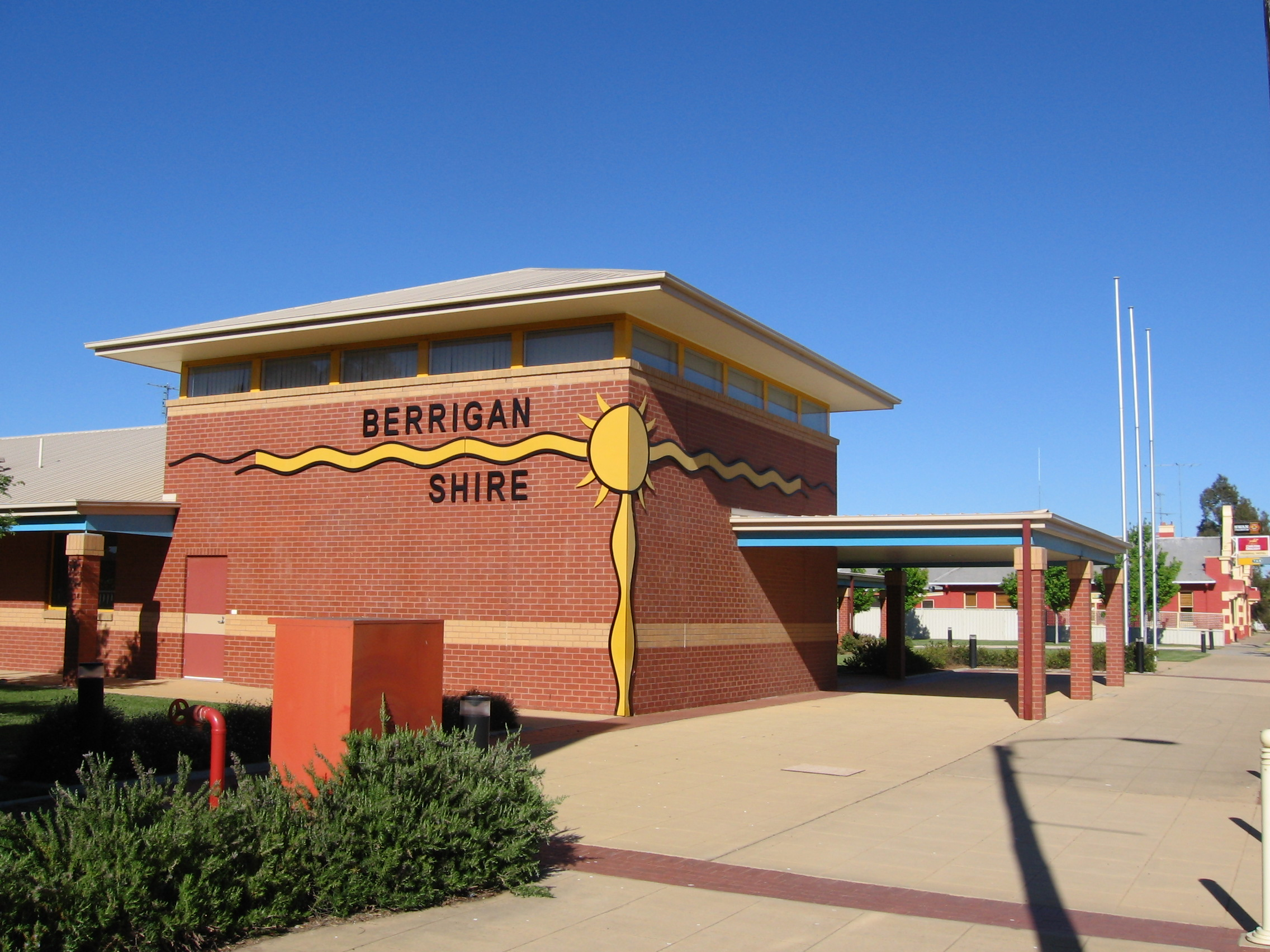
Offices of the Berrigan Shire Council in Berrigan, New South Wales

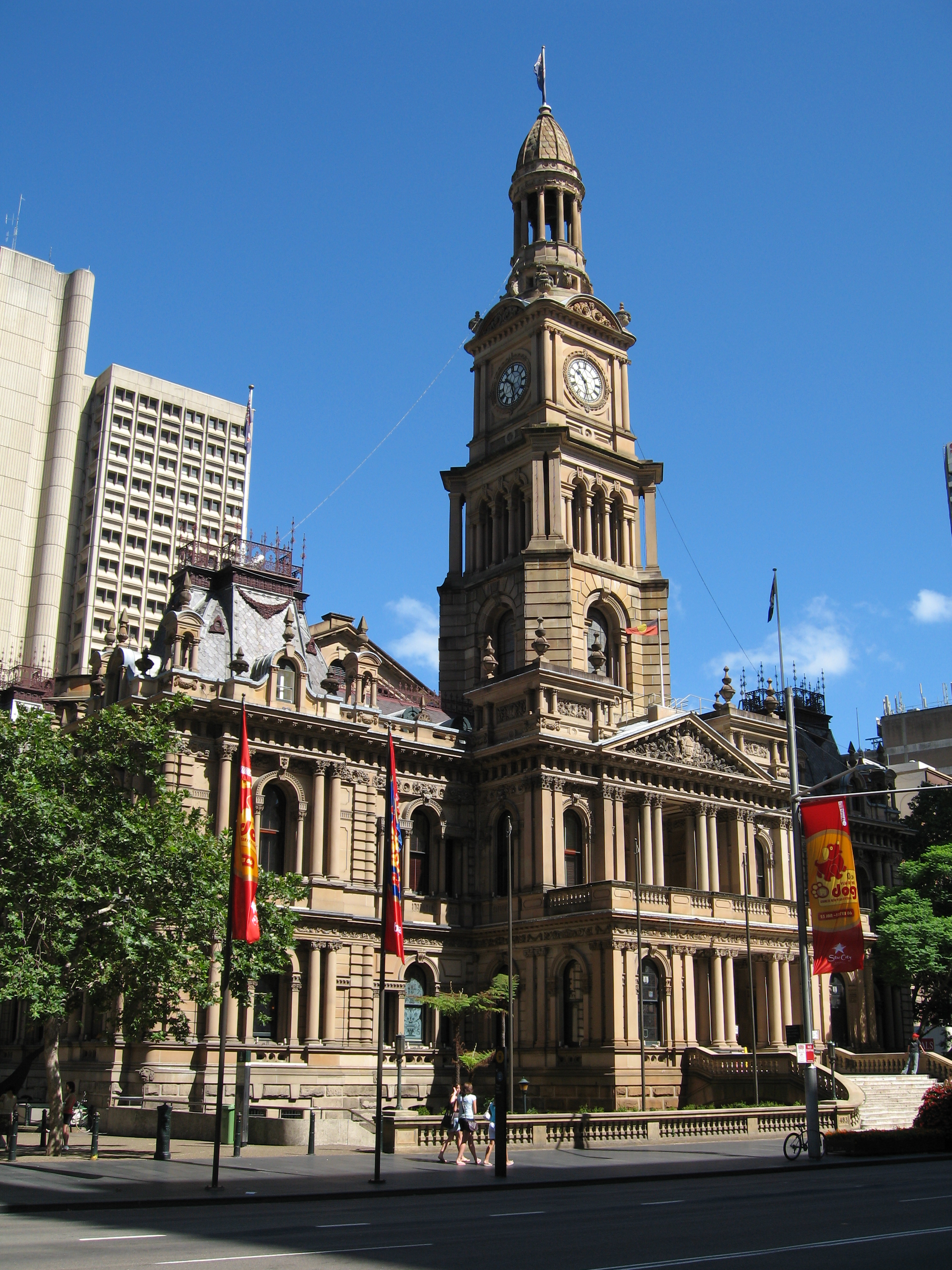
Offices of the City of Sydney council, a local government area within Sydney

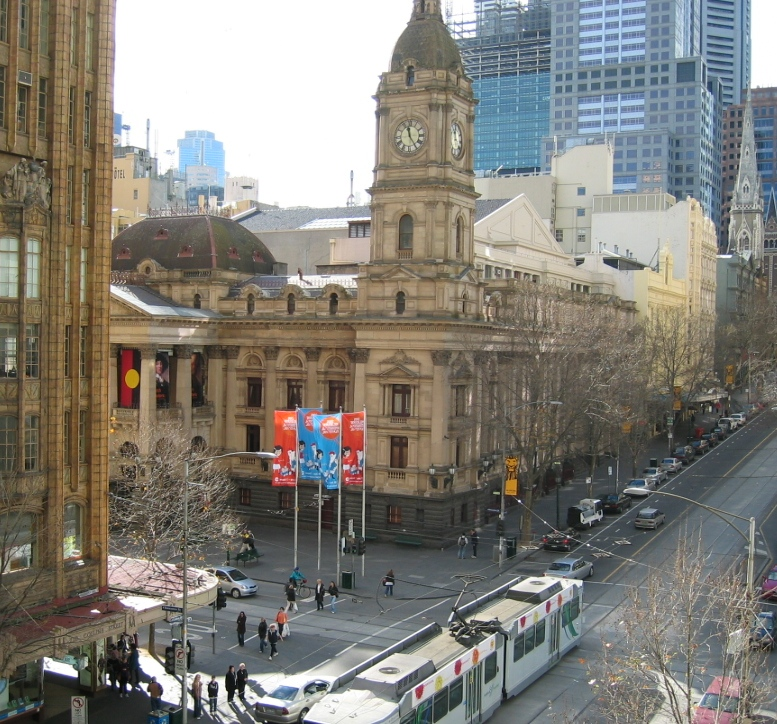
Melbourne Town Hall, the offices of the City of Melbourne council

Local governments are subdivisions of the six federated states as well as the Northern Territory. The term "local government area" (LGA) is used by the ABS to collectively refer to all local government administrative zones regardless of the varying designations.The Australian Capital Territory has no separate local government, and municipal functions in Canberra and the surrounding regions (normally performed by local governments in other states) are performed by the ACT territorial government.

Local government authorities across the country have similar functions and powers, but have different official designations in different states, which may vary based on whether the LGA is regional or for historical reasons. Below is a table that lists the various designations per state.

Australian LGA status by state/territory
State/territory	LGA status
New South Wales	Cities Areas
Northern Territory	Cities Towns Municipalities Shires
Queensland	Cities Shires Towns Regional councils Aboriginal shires
South Australia	Cities Rural cities Municipalities/municipal councils District councils Regional councils Towns Aboriginal councils
Tasmania	Cities Municipalities
Victoria	Cities Rural cities Boroughs Shires
Western Australia	Cities Towns Shires

Most urban municipalities in all states are "cities". Many in Western Australia are officially "towns", even within the Perth metropolitan area. Many rural areas in Queensland, New South Wales, Victoria and Western Australia are "shires", while rural areas in South Australia have "district councils", and those in Tasmania officially use the title "municipality". Due to the Australian Capital Territory's small size it has no local government and is instead overseen by the ACT Legislative Assembly.

Sometimes designations other than "city" or "shire" are used in the names of LGAs, and today the stylised titles of "town", "borough", "municipality", "district", "region", "community government", "Aboriginal council/shire" and "island" are used in addition. The word "municipality" occurs in some states with differing meanings: in New South Wales it is typically used for older urban areas, and the word is used for some rural towns in South Australia. Larger towns and small metropolitan exurban centres in Queensland and Western Australia simply use the term "town", while in Victoria they are designated as "rural city". Historically, the word "borough" was common for small towns and suburban centres in Victoria, but nowadays only the Borough of Queenscliffe remains as the one and only borough in the entire country. New South Wales and Queensland have also introduced a new term "region" for outback LGAs formed by the amalgamation of smaller shires and rural cities. In New South Wales, where the Local Government Act does not mandate adopting a designation, some local government areas are legally known simply as "council", such as Port Macquarie-Hastings Council, Inner West Council and Federation Council. Some rural areas in South Australia are known as "district council", and all the LGAs in Tasmania that were previously municipalities have been renamed "council".

Almost all local councils have the same administrative functions and similar political structures, regardless of their naming, and retain a particular designation ("shire", "borough", "town", "city") for historical reasons only. They will typically have an elected council and usually a mayor or shire president responsible for chairing meetings of the council. In some councils, the mayor is a directly elected figure, but in most cases the mayor is elected by the board of fellow councillors. The powers of mayors vary as well; for example, mayors in Queensland have broad executive functions, whereas mayors in New South Wales are essentially ceremonial figureheads who can only exercise power at the discretion of the council.

Most of the capital city LGAs administer only the central business districts and nearby central suburbs. A notable exception is the City of Brisbane, the most populous LGA in the country, which administers a significant part of the Brisbane metropolitan area. In most cases, when a city's population statistics are used, it is the statistical division population rather than the local government area.

=== Local governments by type and state ===
The following table provides a summary of local government areas by states and territories by local government area types as of December 2023:

Local government area types	NSW	Vic	Qld	WA	SA	Tas	NT	ACT	Total
Aboriginal councils					2				2
Aboriginal shires			12						12
Boroughs		1							1
Cities	30	34	8	27	21	6	2		128
Councils	32				17	23	2		74
District councils					23				23
Municipalities	2								2
Regional councils	9		29		4		9		51
Rural cities		6			1				7
Shires	55	38	28	104			2		227
Towns			1	8	2		2		13
Sub-total	128	79	78	139	70	29	17	0	540
Unincorporated	2	9		2	1		7	1	22
Total	130	88	78	141	71	29	24	1	562

Note the above table does not include the county councils of New South Wales, which while a form of local government are not classified as being local government areas.

=== Classification ===
The Australian Classification of Local Governments (ACLG) categorises local governing authorities using the population, the population density and the proportion of the population that is classified as being urban for the council. The classification, at the two-digit level, is:

- RA – Rural Agricultural
- RS – Rural Significant
- RT – Rural Remote
- UC – Urban Capital
- UD – Urban Developed
- UF – Urban Fringe
- UR – Urban Regional

== Powers and functions ==
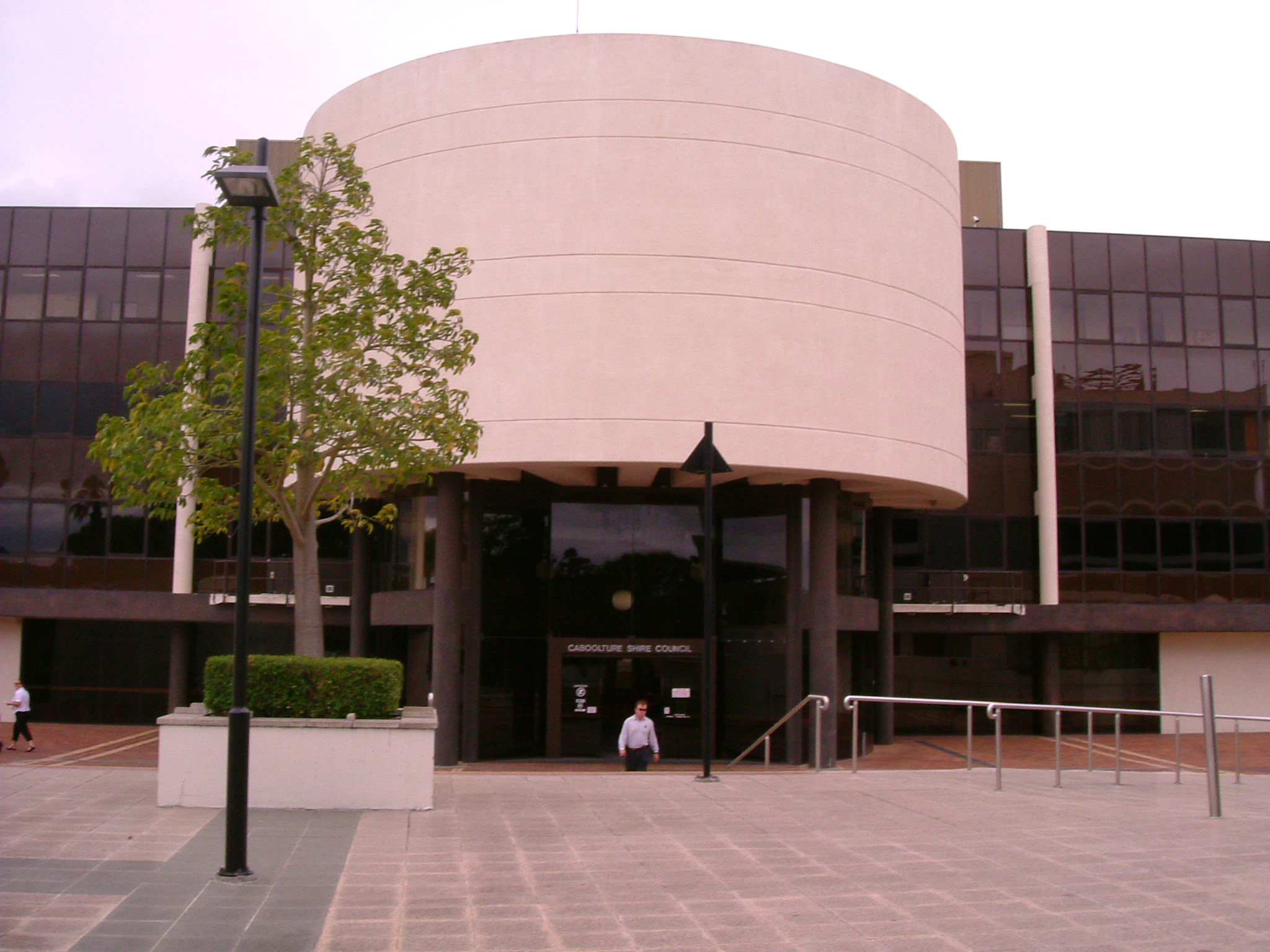
Offices of the Moreton Bay Regional Council in Caboolture, Queensland

All local governments are approximately equal in their theoretical powers, although LGAs that encompass large cities such as Brisbane and the Gold Coast command more resources due to their larger population base. Unlike local governments in many other countries, services such as police, fire protection and schools are provided by respective state or territory governments rather than by local councils. However, local governments still maintain some responsibility for fire service functions within Queensland and Western Australia.

The councils' chief responsibility in the first half of the 20th century was the provision of physical infrastructure such as roads, bridges and sewerage. From the 1970s the emphasis changed to community facilities such as libraries and parks, maintenance of local roads, town planning and development approvals, and local services such as waste disposal. Child care, tourism and urban renewal were also beginning to be part of local governments' role. These are financed by collection of local land taxes known as "rates", and grants from the state and Commonwealth governments. They are caricatured as being concerned only with the "three Rs": Rates, Roads and Rubbish.

However, the roles of local government areas in Australia have recently expanded as higher levels of government have devolved activities to the third tier. Examples include the provision of community health services, regional airports and pollution control as well as community safety and accessible transport. The changes in services has been described as a shift from 'services to property' towards 'services to people'. Community expectations of local government in Australia have risen in the 21st century partly as a result of wider participation in decision-making and transparent management practices.

Recent years have seen some State governments devolving additional powers onto LGAs. In Queensland and Western Australia LGAs have been granted the power to independently enact their own local subsidiary legislation, in contrast to the previous system of by-laws. Councils also have organised their own representative structures such as Local Government Associations and Regional Organisations of Councils.

Doctrines of New Public Management have shaped state government legislation towards increased freedoms aiming to allow greater flexibility on the part of local governments.

== History ==
There is no mention of local government in the Constitution of Australia, though it is mentioned several times in the Annotated Constitution of Australia. "Municipal institutions and local government" appears in Annotation 447, and "Power of the Parliament of a Colony" appears under "Residuary Legislative Powers" on pages 935 and 936.

The first official local government in Australia was the Perth Town Trust, established in 1838, only three years after British colonisation of Western Australia. The Adelaide Corporation followed, created by the province of South Australia in October 1840. The City of Melbourne and the Sydney Corporation followed, both in 1842. All of these early forms failed; it was not until the 1860s and 1870s that the various colonies established widespread stable forms of local government, mainly for the purpose of raising money to build roads in rural and outer-urban regions. Council representatives attended conventions before Federation, however local government was unquestionably regarded as outside the Constitutional realm.

In the 1970s, the Whitlam government expanded the level of funding to local governments in Australia beyond grants for road construction. General purpose grants become available for the first time.

=== Reforms ===
Significant reforms took place in the 1980s and 1990s in which state governments used metrics and efficiency analysis developed within the private sector in the local government arena. Each state conducted an inquiry into the benefits of council amalgamations during the 1990s. In the early 1990s, Victoria saw the number of local councils reduced from 210 to 78. South Australia, Tasmania and Queensland saw some reductions in the number of local governments while Western Australia and New South Wales rejected compulsory mergers. New South Wales eventually forced the merging of some councils. The main purpose of amalgamating councils was for greater efficiency and to improve operations, but forced amalgamation of councils is sometimes seen as a dilution of representative democracy.

An increase in the range of services offered by councils, but only minor cost savings of less than 10% have been noted by academics as outcomes after mergers. The council mergers have resulted in widespread job losses and lingering resentment from some whose roles have experienced a larger workload.

The growth of the Regional Organisations of Councils has also been a factor in local government reform in Australia. In 1995, there were 50 such agreements across the country. A 2002 study identified 55 ROCs with the largest involving 18 councils.

== Constitutional position ==
Local government powers are determined by state governments, and states have primary responsibility for funding and exclusive responsibility for supervision of local councils.

Local government is mentioned in the annotated Australian constitution, as a department of the State Governments, and they are mentioned in the constitutions of each of the six states.

Under the Constitution, the federal government cannot provide funding directly to local governments; a 1974 referendum sought to amend the Constitution to authorise the federal government to directly fund local governments, but it was defeated.

A 1988 referendum sought to explicitly insert mention of local government in the federal constitution but this was comprehensively defeated. A further referendum was proposed in 2013, but was cancelled due to the change in the election date.

Federal government interaction with local councils happens regularly through the provision of federal grants to help fund local government managed projects.

=== State/territory control ===
Victoria LGAs by largest council faction as of December 2022

New South Wales LGAs by largest council faction as of December 2022

Local government in Australia has very limited legislative powers and no judicial powers, and executive-wise is subject to the exclusive jurisdiction of the state/territory it belongs to. The functions and practices of local councils are mostly centred around managing public services and land uses at the community level, and are similar throughout Australia, but can vary to some degree between jurisdictions. State departments oversee the activities of local councils and may intervene in their affairs when needed, subject to relevant legislation.

For more details in each state and territory, see the following:

- Local government areas of New South Wales
- Local government areas of the Northern Territory
- Local government in Queensland and Local government areas of Queensland (list)
- Local government areas of South Australia
- Local government areas of Tasmania
- Local government in Victoria and Local government areas of Victoria (list)
- Local government areas of Western Australia

The Australian Capital Territory is not divided into local government areas, so it is regarded as a single "unincorporated" local government area during censusing.

== Unincorporated areas ==
Unlike many other countries, Australia has only one level of local government immediately beneath state and territorial governments. Aside from very sparsely populated areas and a few other special cases, almost all of Australia is part of a local government area. Unincorporated areas are often in remote locations, cover vast areas, or have very small populations.

Queensland and Tasmania are entirely partitioned into LGAs and have no unincorporated areas.

=== Australian Capital Territory ===
The Australian Capital Territory (ACT) has no municipalities. The ACT government is responsible for both state-level and local-level matters. In some countries, such an arrangement would be referred to as a unitary authority, but the Australian Bureau of Statistics refers to the whole of the ACT as an unincorporated area.

The ACT Government directorate Transport Canberra & City Services handles responsibilities that are under the purview of local government in other parts of Australia, such as local road maintenance, libraries and waste collection.

Many Canberra districts have community organisations called "community councils", but these are not part of the government (though they generally receive government funding). They do not have the power to change laws or policies, and their role is limited to advising government. They are effectively residents' associations.

=== New South Wales ===
New South Wales has three unincorporated areas:

- Lord Howe Island is managed by the Lord Howe Island Board, a State Government agency.
- The Unincorporated Far West Region covers the western third of the state (other than the City of Broken Hill). This area is sparsely populated. Local government functions in this area are managed directly by the state government and its agencies.
- Sydney Harbour, managed by the Sydney Harbour Federation Trust.

=== Northern Territory ===
In the Northern Territory, 1.47% of the total area and 3.0% of the population are in unincorporated areas. These include the Cox-Daly and Marrakai-Douglas Daly areas in the Top End region, the Northern Territory Rates Act Area and Darwin Waterfront Precinct within Darwin, Nhulunbuy on the Gove Peninsula, Alyangula on Groote Eylandt, and Yulara in Central Australia.

=== South Australia ===
In South Australia, 63% of the state's area is unincorporated. Residents in this area – less than 0.2% of the state's population – receive municipal services provided by a state agency, the Outback Communities Authority.

=== Victoria ===
Victoria has a number of unincorporated areas which are not part of any LGA, including French Island, the six alpine resorts (Falls Creek Alpine Resort, Lake Mountain Alpine Resort, Mount Baw Baw Alpine Resort, Mount Buller Alpine Resort, Mount Hotham Alpine Resort, and Mount Stirling Alpine Resort) and Gabo Island.

The Australian Bureau of Statistics includes numerous other uninhabited offshore islands, including Lady Julia Percy Island, in its definition of unincorporated areas of Victoria.

=== Western Australia ===
Western Australia has two unincorporated areas:

- Abrolhos Islands, which are officially uninhabited and controlled by the WA Department of Primary Industries and Regional Development.
- Kings Park in central Perth, which is administered by the Botanic Gardens and Parks Authority.

== See also ==
- Australian Government
- Australian Local Government Association
- Australian Local Government Fossil Fuel Divestment
- List of local government areas by population
- List of local government areas of Australia
- Undivided council

== Citations ==
- "Table 1: Population growth and turnover in Local Government Areas (LGAs), 2006 to 2011". Australian Bureau of Statistics. 25 November 2009. – Spreadsheet of population data for local government areas in the 2006 and 2011 Australian census
