= Carbon bubble =

Hypothesized economic bubble involving fossil-fuel energy producers

Carbon bubble according to data by the Carbon Tracker Initiative (2013)

The carbon bubble is a hypothesized bubble in the valuation of companies dependent on fossil-fuel-based energy production, resulting from future decreases in value of fossil fuel reserves as they become unusable in order to meet carbon budgets and recognition of negative externalities of carbon fuels which are not yet taken into account in a company's stock market valuation.

While most campaigns to reduce the investment, production, and use of fossil fuels has been based on ethical reasons, financial analysts, economists, and financial institutions have increasingly argued in favor of doing so for financial reasons. Thus, properly pricing fossil fuels based on the carbon bubble theory would mean renewable energy would be significantly more attractive to invest in, and therefore speed up the transition towards sustainable energy.

Many investors throughout the world are raising capital for fossil fuel exploration. However, as the current reserves already exceed the carbon budget these new reserves are unlikely to be exploited, meaning the value of those investments will suffer serious decreases. However, investors are currently encouraged by quarterly result cycles and current accounting standards to ignore these long-term issues in favor of higher short-term gains. The biggest problem for governments and investors is re-balancing the value of these investments with as little damage to the economy or market as possible. An estimate made by Kepler Cheuvreux puts the loss in value of the fossil fuel companies due to the impact of the growing renewables industry at US$28 trillion over the next two decades. A more recent analysis made by Citi puts that figure at $100 trillion.

In 2021, an analysis has found 90% of coal and 60% of oil and gas reserves could not be extracted if there was to be even a 50% chance of keeping global heating below 1.5C.

== Etymology ==
The term "carbon bubble" arose in the early 21st century from the increasing awareness of the impact of fossil fuel combustion on global temperatures. "Carbon" refers to the hydrocarbon contained in fossil fuels, while "bubble" refers to economic bubbles, situations where the prices of asset are much higher than the intrinsic value. The term was coined by the Carbon Tracker Initiative which published key reports in July 2011 and April 2013. and it was further popularised in the New Scientist magazine in October 2011. A widely shared article by Bill McKibben was published in Rolling Stone magazine in July 2012, bringing the idea to the attention of a popular audience. These were followed later in 2013 by a report from the Demos think tank.

== Value of fossil-fuel reserves ==
Carbon budgets are upper limits on the amount of carbon dioxide emissions that can be released without increasing the global average temperature past a certain point. In 2011, the Carbon Tracker Initiative calculated that at that point the world could only burn 20% of its carbon-based fuel reserves if it wished to stay below a 2 °C increase that has been agreed upon by the UNFCCC members. This meant that the remaining 80% could not be burned, and so what governments and investors were treating as low-risk assets were actually very likely to become stranded assets. This could have serious economic implications, as the London Stock Exchange, São Paulo Stock Exchange, and Moscow Exchange (among others) had an estimated 20-30% of their market capitalization connected to fossil fuels. In the case of London, for example, the fossil fuel reserves listed in the exchange were ten times its carbon budget from 2011 to 2050. As those assets become "unburnable" and therefore lose most of their value (or became liabilities), this will put the strength of the British economy at stake. This is because the viability of these businesses depends on their ability to extract and sell carbon, rather than past emission-generating operations.

A newer analysis has found, global emissions from fossil fuel reserves would exceed carbon budget by more than seven times. Additionally, companies are continuing to gather more reserves as well as explore unproven reserves, meaning that there is an even larger hidden amount of reserves hidden within capital markets, further increasing the size of the carbon bubble.

Currently, reduction of a company's reserves is seen negatively by investors, even when it is the correct thing in the long-term interests of the company. For example, when Shell reduced its reserves by 20% in January 2004, its share price dropped by 10% in a week.

Author Bill McKibben has estimated that to sustain human life in the world, up to US$20 trillion worth of fossil fuel reserves will need to remain in the ground. In 2021, an analysis has found 90% of coal and 60% of oil and gas reserves could not be extracted if there was to be even a 50% chance of keeping global heating below 1.5C. The Stern report in 2006 stated that the benefits of strong, early action to decrease the use of oil, coal and gas considerably outweigh the costs. Fossil fuel contributors, the building industry, and land use practices ignore the responsibility of the external costs and ignore the polluter pays principle according to which climate change costs will be paid by historical climate polluters.

In 2015, Mark Carney, the Governor of the Bank of England, in his lecture to Lloyd's of London, warned that limiting global warming to 2 °C appears to require that the "vast majority" of fossil fuel reserves be "stranded assets", or "literally unburnable without expensive carbon-capture technology", resulting in "potentially huge" exposure to investors in that sector.

== Prospects for orderly bubble deflation ==
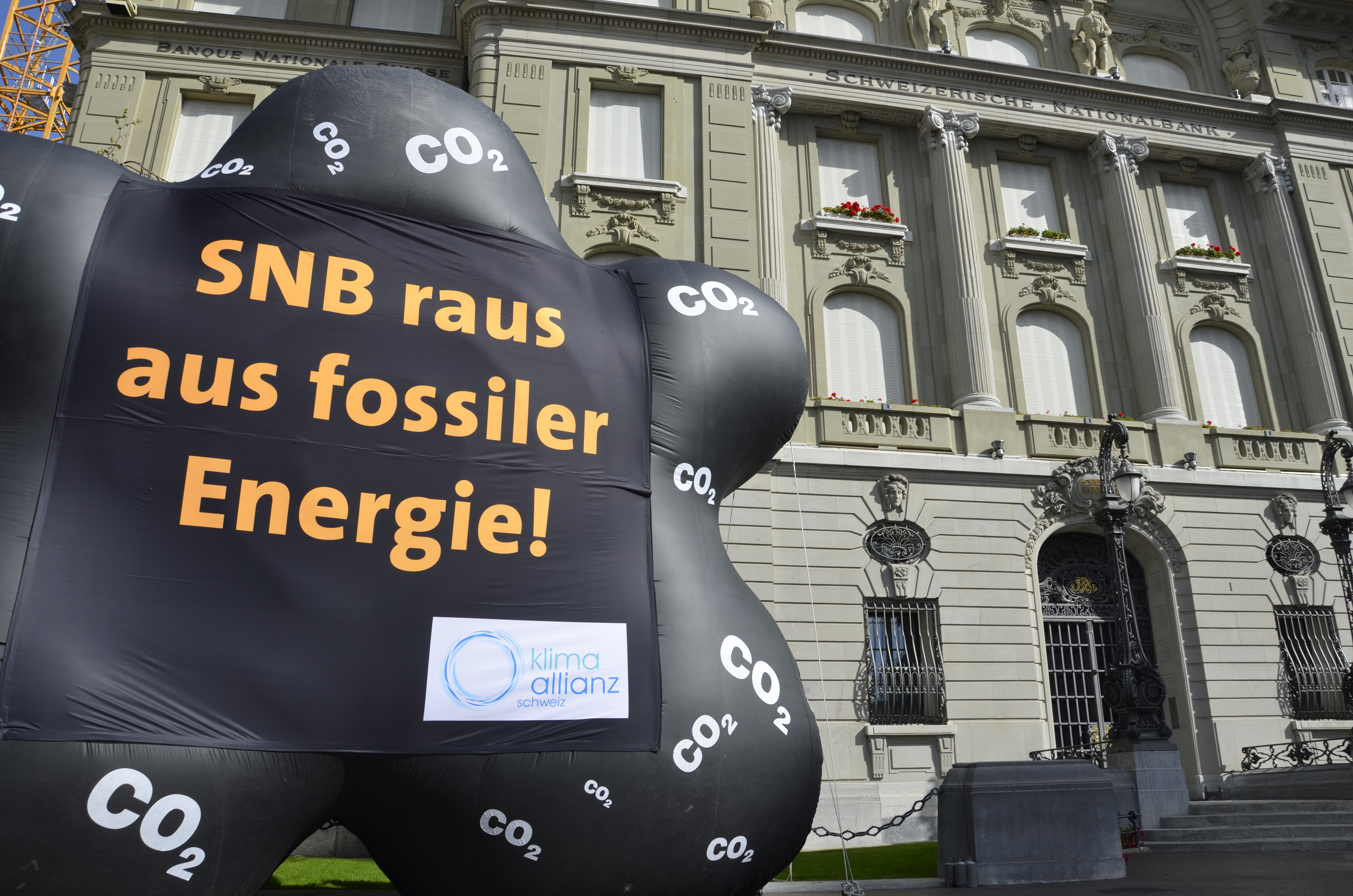
Inflatable carbon bubble asking the Swiss National Bank to divest from fossil fuels (2019)

A planned and orderly transition away from dependence on fossil fuels could prevent a disruptive "bursting of the carbon bubble". A number of developments are supporting such a transition.

=== Government action on climate change ===
A detailed academic study of the consequences for the producers of the various hydrocarbon fuels concluded in early 2015 that a third of global oil reserves, half of gas reserves and over 80% of current coal reserves should remain underground from 2010 to 2050 in order to meet the target of no more than a 2 °C rise in average global temperature. Hence continued exploration or development of reserves would be extraneous to needs. To meet the 2 °C target, strong measures would be needed to suppress demand, such as a substantial carbon tax leaving a lower price for the producers from a smaller market. The impact on producers would vary widely depending on the cost of production in their areas of operation. For example, the impact in Canada would be far larger than in the United States. Open-pit mining of bituminous sands in Canada would soon drop to negligible levels after 2020 in all scenarios considered because it is considerably less economic than other methods of production.

In mid-2015, the Centre for Science and Policy, University of Cambridge published a report assessing the risks from climate change in order to estimate the amount of resources that should be allocated to address them. The report notes that "standard economic estimates of the global costs of climate change are wildly sensitive both to assumptions about the science, and to judgments about the value of human life. They are also likely to be systematically biased towards underestimation of risk, as they tend to omit a wide range of impacts that are difficult to quantify".

=== Awareness in the financial industry ===
By 2013, there was significant awareness in the financial industry of the risks associated with exposure to companies involved in extraction of fossil fuels. In early 2014, the FTSE Group, BlackRock and the Natural Resources Defense Council collaborated in the creation of a stock market index series that excludes companies linked to exploration, ownership or extraction of carbon-based fossil fuel reserves. These indices are intended to make it easier for investors to steer their investments away from such companies. It has been proposed that companies be required by law to report on their greenhouse gas emissions and assess the risk this could pose to their future financial performance. According to Christiana Figueres, UNFCCC, companies have a duty to shareholders to move to a low-carbon economy, because of the effects of the carbon bubble.

=== Divestment campaigning ===
The ongoing fossil fuel divestment campaign in universities, churches and pension funds contributes to divestiture from fossil fuel companies. By late 2015, this divestiture was reported to reach $2.6 trillion, by September 2019, total divestment commitments had grown to an approximate value of $11.48 trillion.

In September 2019, when the University of California announced, it will divest its $83 billion in endowment and pension funds from the fossil fuel industry, UC officials said, they made it for financial reasons: "We believe hanging on to fossil fuel assets is a financial risk."

Jeff Rubin suggested Canada should invest into hydraulic energy and agriculture rather than its oil sands as a way to avoid the effects of the bubble.

=== Cheaper clean energy ===
The price of renewable energy is continually dropping. As of 2014 new wind power is cheaper than new coal and gas power in Australia, China and the United States. Also the electricity produced from a photovoltaic roof system is cheaper than the electricity from the grid in many countries and places in the world.

=== Real pollution control ===
Fossil fuels are known for their huge negative externalities or hidden costs. Tackling this market failure will make alternative energies more competitive and will reduce the consumption of fossil fuels.

=== Cancellation of government energy subsidies ===
According to the International Monetary Fund, governments around the world gave $523 billion direct subsidies for fossil fuels in 2011. If a carbon tax of $25 per ton of CO_{2} is included the subsidies total $1.9 trillion only for 2011. Removing fossil fuels subsidies will further reduce their consumption and make the alternative energies even more competitive.

=== Renewable corporations lobbying ===
As the penetration of the renewable energy increases so will the wealth of the renewable energy corporations. This and the increasing number of employees in the renewable energy sector will inevitably transform into political lobbying against fossil fuels.

=== Urbanization and electric transportation ===
Urbanization combined with increasing availability of convenient, safe and efficient public transport, green buildings and efficient energy distribution, as well as extended product life/use/re-use, increased local recycling and self-sustainability in raw materials drive down energy consumption. Perversely, ready access to travel and luxury, more batteries (energy storage and conversion losses) and proliferation of low cost LED technology, e.g. for advertising and decorative uses, may negate some of the potential energy savings. Switching to renewables sourced, electricity based transportation will reduce the demand for fossil fuels, particularly petroleum. Combining roof photovoltaics with second hand EV batteries will further reduce the dependence on fossil fuels as they will provide the needed grid storage for the times when the intermittent renewable energy sources are not producing electricity.

=== Innovation and efficiency ===
Innovations in, for example, information technology, miniaturisation, LEDs, virtual reality, 3D printing, new materials and biotechnology enable energy reduction in the areas of human sustenance and travel, as well as physical product creation and distribution. They also offer new avenues for economic growth and technological leadership, and are thus especially important for sustained wealth creation in the most developed, net-energy importing nations. Energy consumption may be expected to decrease as the service sector of the economy continues to grow whilst heavy industry, construction, manufacturing and agricultural sectors reduce. Increased investments in energy efficiency may lead to less consumed energy even when the economy grows. Without growth in energy usage the prices of fossil fuels will decrease and most of the mega energy projects may be uneconomical.

=== Demographics and changes in consumer behavior ===
A shrinking and ageing, already materially prosperous, satisfied and individualistic society may be less motivated towards additional, energy consuming material goods and new construction. On the other hand, longer life expectancy and increasing leisure and travel time will increase total energy use over an individual's lifetime. According to research by U.S. PIRG Education Fund reported in late 2014: "Over the last decade – after 60-plus years of steady increases – the number of miles driven by the average American has been falling. Young Americans have experienced the greatest changes: driving less; taking public transport, biking and walking more; and seeking out places to live in cities and walkable communities where driving is an option, not a necessity." Data from the U.S. Energy Information Administration show that U.S. consumption of both coal and petroleum liquids peaked in 2005, and at the end of 2014 had fallen by 21% and 13% respectively. Consumption of natural gas continued to climb, resulting in the rate of total fossil fuel consumption in terms of energy units falling only 6% from its peak in 2007 to a plateau. On the other hand, global consumption of petroleum climbed steadily a total of 32% from 1995 to 2014.

== See also ==
- 100% renewable energy
- Environmental stewardship
- Fossil fuel phase-out
- Stranded asset
- Transport & Environment
