= Australian Local Government Fossil Fuel Divestment =

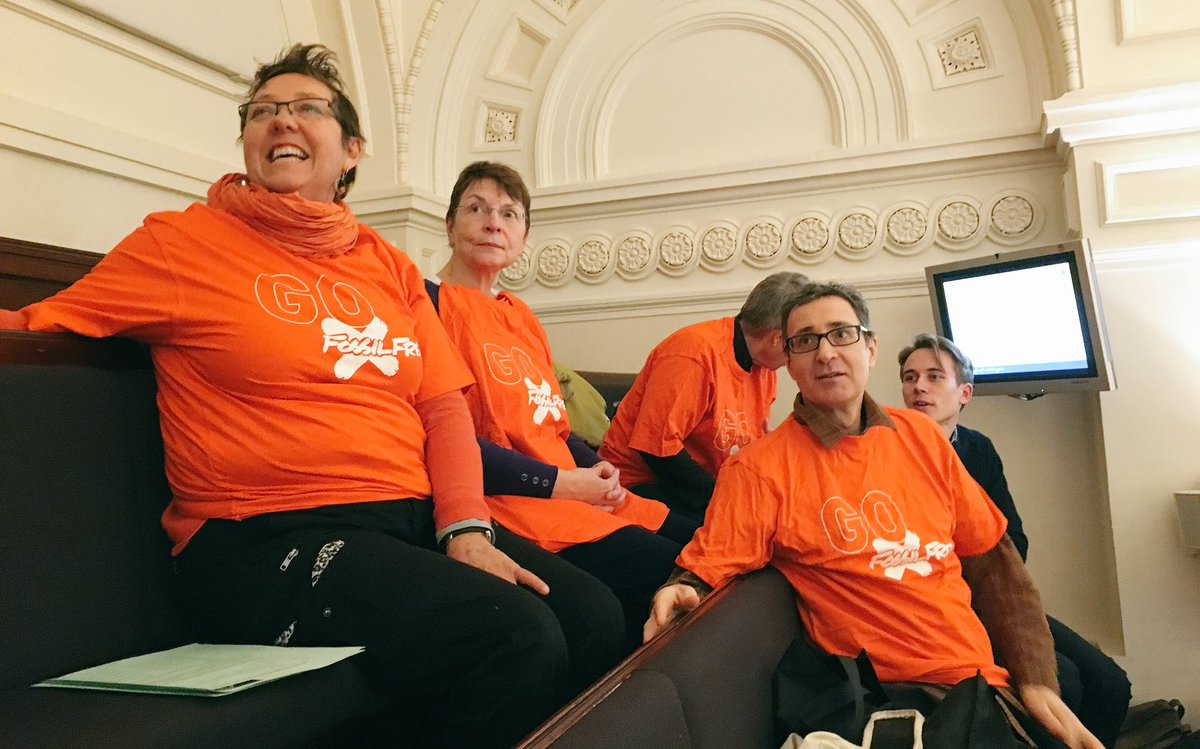
Go Fossil Free attending a City of Sydney council meeting

In Australia, fossil fuel divestment is being led by Universities and Local Councils as part of the global fossil fuel divestment campaign launched by 350.org in 2011. In 2015, the number of Australian councils with divestment commitments increased dramatically from 2 to 17. On 15 September 2016 the status of Australian council divestment was:

- Fossil free investment funds held by Australian Local Councils: 6,181,195,620
- Number of Local Councils with fossil free divestment commitments: 27

Most Australian councils cannot invest in shares, meaning they have no investments directly in climate-change-contributing fossil fuel companies. However, most councils have exposure to fossil fuels via their term deposit accounts with the big Australian banks whom in turn are financing billions of dollars' worth of coal and gas projects across the country. Many councils have been identifying their exposure to 'fossil' banks and have found that the majority of Australian banks (particularly banks other than the 'big four') do not provide finance for the fossil fuel industry.

Research on which banks fund the fossil fuel industry, and those that do not, has been completed and is routinely updated by Market Forces an independent research organisation. Although there have been some public commitments indicating the Australian 'big four' banks will not invest in certain fossil fuel related projects, at 30 June 2016, the 'big four' remain heavily invested in fossil fuel.

== Local Council Divestment by State or Territory ==
Local Councils in Australia are the level of government that is most in touch with wishes and needs of the local community. A growing number of local councils have made commitments to divest their funds from fossil fuel companies and institutions.

Commitments and Documentation
The following tables summarise the divestment actions and commitments of Australian local councils. The table includes references to documents recording council investment & divestment policies and divestment motions that were put before the council, voted on and passed. These documents can be used as a reference point for other councils considering fossil fuel divestment.

Council Amalgamations and Changes
Note in 2016, several NSW local councils were subject to forced amalgamation by the NSW State Government. These councils were put under administration and the democratically elected councillors were sacked. The councils currently continue to operate but it is expected there will be changes resulting from the mergers and enforced state government policy. The motivation and justification for amalgamation appears to be due to objection to the proposed WestConnex motorway by the councils and the community. The Geographical boundaries of councils are also subject to periodic review. The following table refers to Councils as an organisational unit at the time the commitment is made.

=== Australian Capital Territory ===
The existence of local government in Australia is an exclusive "power of the states or territories". Due to the relative small size of the ACT, there are no smaller local governments. The ACT government is responsible for the roles that are otherwise performed by a local council.

Council	Divestment Date	Population	Funds at Time of Divestment	Documentation
Australian Capital Territory	Aug 2015	390,800	$4,505,315,000	

=== New South Wales ===
Council	Divestment Date	Population	Funds at Time of Divestment	Documentation
Marrickville Council	Jan 2015	83,356	$55,000,340	
Leichhardt Municipal Council	Mar 2015	58,136	$79,702,199	
Lismore City Council	Mar 2015	44,629	$50,017,029	
Gloucester Shire Council	Aug 2015	5,064	$6,419,922	
Newcastle City Council	Aug 2015	160,021	$286,104,501	
Byron Shire Council	Oct 2015	32,119	$75,962,424	
Albury City Council	Nov 2015	51,082	$81,190,223	
Ballina Shire Council	Nov 2015	41,644	$69,289,000	
Randwick City Council	Dec 2015	143,776	$75,091,000	

=== Tasmania ===
Council	Divestment Date	Population	Funds at Time of Divestment	Documentation
Hobart City Council	Apr 2015	50,655	$40,962,000	

=== Victoria ===
Council	Divestment Date	Population	Funds at Time of Divestment	Documentation
Moreland City Council	Oct 2014	163,488	$39,212,931	
City of Melbourne	Oct 2015	122,207	$12,596,569	
Banyule City Council	Nov 2015	125,503	$93,640,000	
Macedon Ranges Shire Council	Dec 2015	44,715	$5,946,000	
City of Wodonga	Mar 2016	38,131	$16,874,361	
Mt Alexander Shire Council	Apr 2016	18,102	$13,017,000	
City of Ballarat	Jun 2016	100,283	$76,854,921	
Bass Coast Shire	Jul 2016	31,623	$17,440,000	

=== Western Australia ===
Council	Divestment Date	Population	Funds at Time of Divestment	Documentation
City of Fremantle	Aug 2014	30,883	$100,184,940	
Shire of Goomalling	Feb 2015	991	$1,000,000	
City of Armadale	Nov 2015	77,586	$122,248,041	
Town of Bassendean	Mar 2016	16,288	$8,609,493	
City of Stirling	May 2016	227,367	$201,318,794	
Town of East Fremantle	Jun 2016	7,831	$5,702,520	
City of Vincent	Aug 2016	37,279	$19,683,412	
City of Swan	Sep 2016	130,013	$121,813,000	

=== Other States ===
In South Australia, Northern Territory and Queensland, there are no known council fossil fuel divestments at this time.

== Community Support and Information Sources ==
Local community groups around Australia are supporting Australian councils to divest. The results of their work has been compiled by Fossil Free Australia and the source of information comes from publicly available sites and documents found in the Public domain.

== See also ==
- Divestment
- Fossil fuel divestment
- ANU – Australian National University
