= DC Divest =

- Formation: March 2013ud
- Type: fossil fuel divestment campaign
- Purpose: get the District of Columbia to remove investments in fossil fuels companies from its investment portfolios
- Headquarters: Washington, D.C.
- Website: DCDivest.org

DC Divest is an advocacy campaign that seeks to get Washington, D.C., to remove investments in fossil fuel companies from its investment portfolios, to raise awareness of local climate impacts, and support local climate activism. It is one of hundreds of locally focused campaigns worldwide taking part in the fossil fuel divestment movement, which seeks to increase the sense of urgency among elected officials, financial leaders, and the public around the need for political and social action to mitigate the worst effects of climate change.

DC Divest was founded in March 2013 by a group of Washington, D.C. residents following a call to action by the non-profit environmental advocacy group 350.org. In September 2013, it succeeded in convincing the Council of the District of Columbia to introduce the Fossil Fuel Divestment Act of 2013. In June 2016, advocates announced that the city's $6.4 million major pension fund had, citing financial and moral issues, sold off all direct investments in oil, coal, and gas companies listed on the Carbon Underground 200.

A number of Washington, D.C.–based environmental advocacy groups have given their support of the DC Divest campaign's goal of removing fossil fuel companies from the District's investments, including the D.C. Environmental Network, the Washington DC chapter of the Sierra Club, Moms Clean Air Force, the Chesapeake Climate Action Network, and many others.

== See also ==
- Fossil fuel divestment
- Divestment campaign
- Bill McKibben
- Climate change mitigation
- Climate change policy of the United States
- Environmental movement
- Individual and political action on climate change
- Politics of global warming
