= List of local government areas of Australia =

A map of all local government areas in Australia

This list has been broken down into several sublists:

- Local government areas of New South Wales
- Local government areas of the Northern Territory
- Local government areas of Queensland
- Local government areas of South Australia
- Local government areas of Tasmania
- Local government areas of Victoria
- Local government areas of Western Australia
