= Stranded asset =

Former physical asset, now a liability

Stranded assets are "assets that have suffered from unanticipated or premature write-downs, devaluations or conversion to liabilities". Stranded assets can be caused by a variety of factors and are a phenomenon inherent in the 'creative destruction' of economic growth, transformation and innovation; as such they pose risks to individuals and firms and may have systemic implications. Climate change is expected to cause a significant increase in stranded assets for carbon-intensive industries and investors, with a potential ripple effect throughout the world economy.

The term is important to financial risk management in order to avoid economic loss after an asset has been converted to a liability. Accountants have measures to deal with the impairment of assets (e.g. IAS 16) which seek to ensure that an entity's assets are not carried at more than their recoverable amount. In this context, stranded assets are also defined as an asset that has become obsolete or non-performing, but must be recorded on the balance sheet as a loss of profit.

== Climate-related asset stranding ==
The term stranded assets has gained significant prominence in environmental and climate change discourse, where the focus has been on how environment-related factors (such as climate change) could strand assets in different sectors. The term "climate-related asset stranding" is often used in this context. This will affect oil, gas, and coal companies, and "carbon-intensive industries such as steel, aluminum, cement, plastics, and greenhouse horticulture". More broadly, countries that rely on fossil fuel exports and workers with technology-specific skills can be thought of in terms of stranded assets. According to the Stranded Assets Programme at the University of Oxford's Smith School of Enterprise and the Environment, some of the environment-related risk factors that could result in stranded assets are:

- environmental challenges (e.g. climate change, natural capital degradation)
- changing resource landscapes including resource depletion (e.g. shale-gas abundance, phosphate scarcity)
- new government regulations (e.g. carbon pricing, air pollution regulation, carbon bubble)
- falling clean-technology costs (e.g. solar photovoltaics, onshore wind, electric vehicles)
- evolving social norms (e.g. fossil fuel divestment campaign) and consumer behaviour (e.g. certification schemes)
- litigation (e.g. carbon liability) and changing statutory interpretations (e.g. fiduciary duty, disclosure requirements)

In the context of upstream energy production, the International Energy Agency defines stranded assets as "those investments which are made but which, at some time prior to the end of their economic life (as assumed at the investment decision point), are no longer able to generate an economic return, as a result of changes in the market and regulatory environment."

The academic literature has provided evidence that large portions of existing proven reserves of coal, oil, and natural gas must remain unextracted or stranded in order to limit the increase in global average temperature to below 1.5°C, or even 2°C. Welsby and coauthors in a 2021 study published in Nature found that nearly 60 percent of proven reserves of oil and natural gas and 90 percent of coal proven reserves must be left untouched to allow a 50 percent change to limit the global temperature increase to 1.5°C compared to the preindustrial era. This evidence suggests that continued investments in expanding fossil fuel reserves—through new exploration, oil and gas field development, or coal mining—may result in assets becoming stranded in the future if the low-carbon transition materializes.

A 2026 estimate found that the early closure of coal-fired capacity needed to stay within a 1.5°C pathway would strand around $842 billion globally, with a further $338 billion avoidable if planned plants are cancelled before construction.

The carbon bubble is one popular example of how an environment-related risk factor could create stranded assets.

In discussions of electric power generation deregulation, the related term stranded costs represents the existing investments in infrastructure for the incumbent utility that may become redundant in a competitive environment.

== See also ==
- Concrete recycling – Re-use of rubble from demolished concrete structures
- Carbon offset – Carbon dioxide reduction scheme
- Carbon tax – Tax on carbon emissions
- Climate lawsuit – Use of legal practice to further climate change mitigation
- Disruptive innovation – Technological change
- Environmental stewardship – Core principle of social ecology
- Economics of climate change
- Ghost town repopulation – Abandoned settlement with intact features
- Leapfrogging – Concept of fast advancement
- Land recycling – Reuse of abandoned buildings or sites
