= Loni =

Loni may refer to:

== Places ==
- Loni, Ahmednagar, a village in Maharashtra, India
- Loni, Bijapur, a village in Karnataka, India
- Loni, Ghaziabad, a town in Uttar Pradesh, India
- Luni (Punjab), also spelled Loni, a village in Pakistan

== People and fictional characters ==
- Loni (given name), including a list of people and fictional characters
- Loni (Pashtun tribe), a tribe in Pakistan
- Arman Loni (1983–2019), Pakistani Pashtun human rights activist
- Wranga Loni, Pakistani Pashtun human rights activist and writer, sister of Arman Loni

== Acronyms ==
- Lay Observer for Northern Ireland, an agency of the Department of Finance in Northern Ireland
- Laboratory of Neuro Imaging, a research laboratory within the University of Southern California

== See also ==
- Lonie, a surname and occasionally a given name
- Loney (disambiguation)
