= Lonnie =

- Pronunciation: /ˈlɒni/ LON-ee
- Gender: Male

Origin
- Origin: Germanic

Lonnie is a given name usually used for males.

== People ==
- Lonnie Chisenhall (born 1988), American baseball player
- Alonzo Clayton (1876–1917), American horse racing jockey
- Lonnie Coleman (1920–1982), American novelist and playwright known for the Beulah Land trilogy
- Lonnie Dennis (1937–1997), Canadian football player
- Lonnie Dixon (1932–2011), American collegiate basketball official
- Lonnie Donegan (1931–2002), British skiffle musician known as the King of Skiffle
- Lonnie Ford (born 1979), American football player in the Arena Football League
- Lonnie Theodore Binion (1943–1998), American casino executive
- Lonnie Franklin (1952-2020), prolific American serial killer and rapist
- Lonnie Frisbee (1949–1993), American Pentecostal evangelist and mystic
- Lonnie Goldstein (1918–2013), American baseball player
- Lonnie Gordon, American singer and songwriter from the Bronx
- Lonnie Graham, photographer, professor, installation artist and cultural activist
- Lonnie Hammargren (born 1937), American politician
- Lonnie Hanzon (born 1959), American artist based in Colorado
- Lonnie Hillyer (1940–1985), American jazz trumpeter
- Lonnie Holley (born 1950), American artist
- Lonnie Johnson (musician) (1899–1970), American blues and jazz singer, guitarist and songwriter
- Lonnie Johnson (inventor) (born 1949), American engineer and inventor known for the Super Soaker water gun
- Lonnie Johnson (American football) (born 1971), American football player
- Lonnie Johnson Jr. (born 1995), American football player
- Lonnie Jordan (born 1948), American funk musician, founding member of War
- Lonnie C. King, Jr., African-American human rights activist
- Lonnie Kjer (born 1972), (Previously Lonnie Devantier) Danish singer who competed in the Eurovision contest of 1990
- Lonnie D. Kliever (1932–2004), American professor of religious studies
- Lonnie Latham (born 1946), American pastor in Oklahoma
- Lonnie Lee (born 1940), Australian singer
- Lonnie Loach (born 1968), Canadian ice hockey player
- Lonnie Lynn (1943–2014), American basketball player
- Lonnie Rashid Lynn, Jr. (born 1972), American hip-hop artist and actor known by the name Common
- Lonnie Mack (1941–2016), stage name of American blues-rock guitarist and singer, Lonnie McIntosh
- Lonnie Maclin (born 1967), American baseball player
- Lonnie Marshall, American bassist, singer and songwriter
- Lonnie Marts (born 1968), American football player
- Lonnie Mayne (1944–1978), American professional wrestler
- Lonnie R. Moore (1920–1956), American World War II bomber pilot and Korean War double ace
- Lonnie McLucas, former Black Panther Party member and convicted murderer
- Lonnie Napier (1940–2023), American politician
- Lonnie Nielsen (1953–2021), American golfer
- Lonnie Ortega (born 1946), American artist specializing in aviation art
- Lonnie Palelei (born 1971), American football player
- Lonnie Park, musician and front man of Ten Man Push
- Lonnie Perrin (1952–2021), American football player
- Lonnie Phelps (born 2000), American football player
- Lonnie "Bo" Pilgrim (1928–2017), American entrepreneur, founder of Pilgrim's Pride
- Lonnie Pitchford (1955–1998), American blues musician and instrument maker in Mississippi
- Lonnie Plaxico (born 1960), African-American jazz bassist
- Lonnie Quinn (born 1963), American meteorologist
- Lonnie Randolph (Indiana politician) (born 1949), American politician
- Lonnie Randolph Jr. (1950-2024), American civil rights activist
- Lonnie Sanders (born 1941), American football player
- Lonnie Shelton (1955–2018), American athlete who played basketball for the New York Knicks
- Lonnie Simmons, American record producer
- Lonnie Smith (born 1955), American baseball outfielder
- Lonnie Smith (organist) (1942–2021), American jazz musician
- Lonnie Smith (boxer) (born 1962), American former lightweight champion boxer
- Lonnie Liston Smith (born 1940), American jazz, soul and funk musician
- Lonnie Spragg (1879–1904), rugby union player who represented Australia
- Lonnie Szoke (born 1978), Canadian musician, songwriter and record producer
- Lonnie Thompson (born 1948), American paleoclimatologist
- Lonnie Lee Van Zandt (1937–1995), American professor of physics at Purdue University
- Lonnie Walker IV (born 1998), American basketball player
- Lon Warneke (1909–1976), American baseball player, umpire and judge
- Lonnie Warwick (born 1942), American football player
- Lonnie Wright (1945–2012), American professional basketball and football player
- LeeRoy Yarbrough (1938–1984), American NASCAR race car driver
- Lonnie Young (born 1963), American football player
- Lonnie Youngblood (born 1941), American saxophonist and bandleader
- Lonnie Zamora (1933–2009), New Mexico police officer who reported a UFO

== Fictional characters ==
- Lonnie, a recurring character on Scrubs
- Lonnie, a Horde soldier in She-Ra and the Princesses of Power
- Lonnie, the daughter of Mulan and Li Shang from the Disney film Descendants
- Lonnie Byers, father of Will and Jonathan Byers in Stranger Things
- Lonnie Garamond, titular character in the song "Lonnie" by Godley & Creme
- Lonnie Jamison, a police officer in In the Heat of the Night
- Lonnie Machin, a.k.a. Anarky, a DC Comics supervillain
- Lonnie Lincoln, a.k.a. Tombstone, a Marvel Comics supervillain
- Lonnie Tallbutt, a character from Freakazoid!, and parody of the Wolf Man
- Lonnie Smith, a character from Meet Me in St. Louis, portrayed by Henry H. Daniels Jr.
- Lonnie Hawkins, a character from The Hawk, portrayed by Will Ferrell

== See also ==
- Loni (given name), a usually female name
- Loni (disambiguation)
- Lonny (given name)
