= Luni, Pakistan =

Luni is the name of two villages in Pakistan:

- Luni (Balochistan)
- Luni (Punjab)
