= Lonny =

Lonny may refer to:

- Lonny, given name
- Lonny, Ardennes, commune in Grand Est in northern France
- Lonny (magazine)
