= Luni =

Luni or Lo(o)ni may refer to:

== Places and jurisdictions ==
=== Italy ===
- Luni, Italy, a town in Liguria
- the former Latin Catholic Diocese of Luni, with see in the above town

=== India ===
- Luni, Rajasthan, a town in Rajasthan
- Luni River, in Rajasthan

=== Pakistan ===
- Luni (Balochistan), a village in Pakistani Baluchistan
- Looni (also spelled Luni), a town and union council in Khyber-Pakhtunkhwa
- Luni (Punjab), a village in Pakistani province Punjab

== People ==
- Loni (Pashtun tribe), also spelled Luni
  - Arman Loni (1983–2019), Pashtun human rights activist
  - Wranga Loni, Pashtun human rights activist (sister of Arman Loni)
- Luni Coleone (born 1978), California rapper

== See also ==
- Looney (disambiguation)
