= 2021 United Nations Climate Change Conference =

26th UN Climate Change conference held in Glasgow, Scotland

- Date: 31 October – 13 November 2021
- Location: SEC Centre, Glasgow, Scotland; 55°51′40″N 04°17′17″W
- Also known as: COP26 (UNFCCC); CMP16 (Kyoto Protocol); CMA3 (Paris Agreement)
- Organised by: United Kingdom and Italy
- President: Alok Sharma
- Previous event: ← Madrid 2019
- Next event: → Sharm El Sheikh 2022
- Website: ukcop26.org

The 2021 United Nations Climate Change Conference, more commonly referred to as COP26, was the 26th United Nations Climate Change conference, held from 31 October to 13 November 2021 at the SEC Centre in Glasgow, Scotland. The president of the conference was UK cabinet minister Alok Sharma. Delayed for a year due to the COVID-19 pandemic, it was the 26th Conference of the Parties (COP) to the United Nations Framework Convention on Climate Change (UNFCCC), the third meeting of the parties to the 2015 Paris Agreement (designated CMA1, CMA2, CMA3), and the 16th meeting of the parties to the Kyoto Protocol (CMP16).

The conference was the first since the Paris Agreement of COP21 that expected parties to make enhanced commitments towards mitigating climate change; the Paris Agreement requires parties to carry out a process colloquially known as the 'ratchet mechanism' every five years to provide improved national pledges. The result of COP26 was the Glasgow Climate Pact, negotiated through consensus of the representatives of the 197 attending parties. Owing to late interventions from India and China that weakened a move to end coal power and fossil fuel subsidies, the conference ended with the adoption of a less stringent resolution than some anticipated. Nevertheless, the pact was the first climate deal to explicitly commit to reducing the use of coal. It included wording that encouraged more urgent greenhouse gas emissions cuts and promised more climate finance for developing countries to adapt to climate impacts.

In the midst of the conference, on 6 November 2021, a march against inadequate action at the conference, as well as for other climate change-related issues, became the largest protest in Glasgow since anti-Iraq War marches in 2003. Additional rallies took place in 100 other countries.

== Background ==
=== Presidency ===
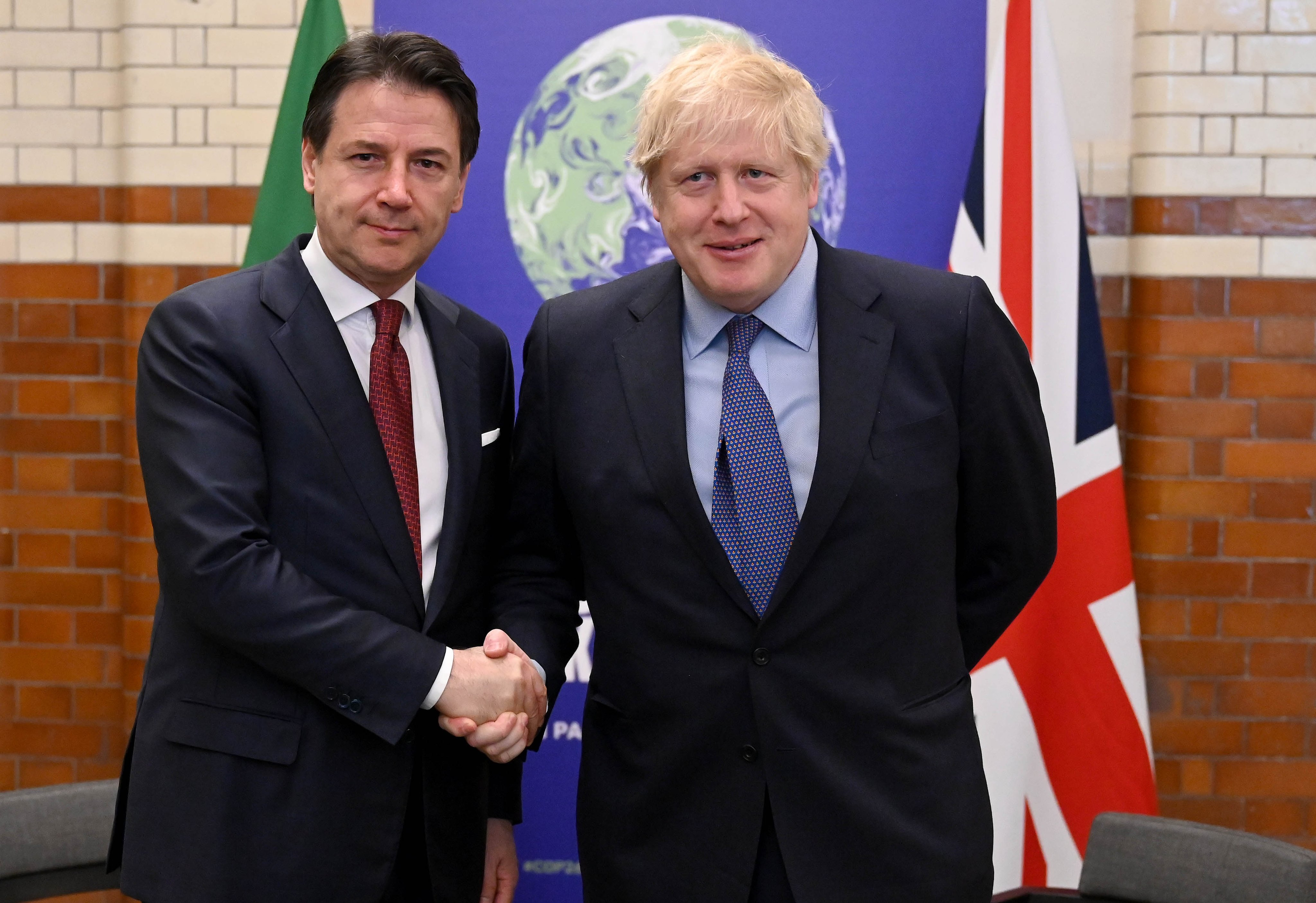
Italian Prime Minister Giuseppe Conte (left) and UK Prime Minister Boris Johnson (right) in London at the launch of COP26 in February 2020, prior to it being postponed a year

The United Kingdom holds the presidency of COP26 until the start of COP27. Initially, the Minister of State for Energy and Clean Growth, Claire Perry, was appointed as president of the conference, but she was removed on 31 January 2020, several months after she had stepped down as an MP. Former Prime Minister David Cameron and former Foreign Secretary William Hague declined to take the role. On 13 February 2020, Business, Energy and Industrial Strategy Secretary Alok Sharma was appointed. On 8 January 2021, Sharma was succeeded by Kwasi Kwarteng as Business, Energy and Industrial Strategy Secretary and moved to the Cabinet Office, in order to focus on the presidency full-time.

Nigel Topping, the former CEO of climate change action organization We Mean Business, was appointed the UK Government's High Level Climate Action Champion for COP26.

Italy partnered with the UK in leading COP26. For the most part, their role was in preparatory work such as the hosting of a pre-COP session and an event for young people called Youth4Climate 2020: Driving Ambition. These events took place between 28 September and 2 October 2020 in Milan.

=== Postponement ===
Because of the COVID-19 pandemic, in April 2020 the conference was postponed to 31 October – 12 November 2021. Both host countries, Italy and the UK, were heavily affected by the pandemic, and the venue of the conference, the SEC Centre in Glasgow, was converted in May 2020 into a temporary hospital for COVID-19 patients in Scotland.

Convention Secretary Patricia Espinosa tweeted that "in light of the ongoing, worldwide effects of COVID-19, holding an ambitious, inclusive, COP26 in November 2020 is not possible." She also indicated that economies restarting would be an opportunity to "shape the 21st-century economy in ways that are clean, green, healthy, just, safe and more resilient." The rearranged date was announced in May 2020. Earlier in 2021, the UK and Italy hosted summits of the G7 and G20, respectively.

Independent observers noted that though not directly related, the postponement gave the international community time to respond to the outcome of the United States presidential election, held in November 2020. President Donald Trump had withdrawn the United States from the Paris Agreement, although this could not take effect until the day after the election; while his Democratic challengers pledged to immediately rejoin and increase ambition to reduce greenhouse gas (GHG) emissions. Joe Biden did so upon being elected as president. At the conference, Biden apologized for Trump's withdrawal from the agreement.

=== Sponsors ===
Previous summits have been sponsored by fossil fuel companies. To reduce this influence, the UK government decided that sponsors "have to have real commitments in place to help them reach net zero in the near future". The first principal partners included three British energy companies and a banking and insurance company.

== Location and participation ==
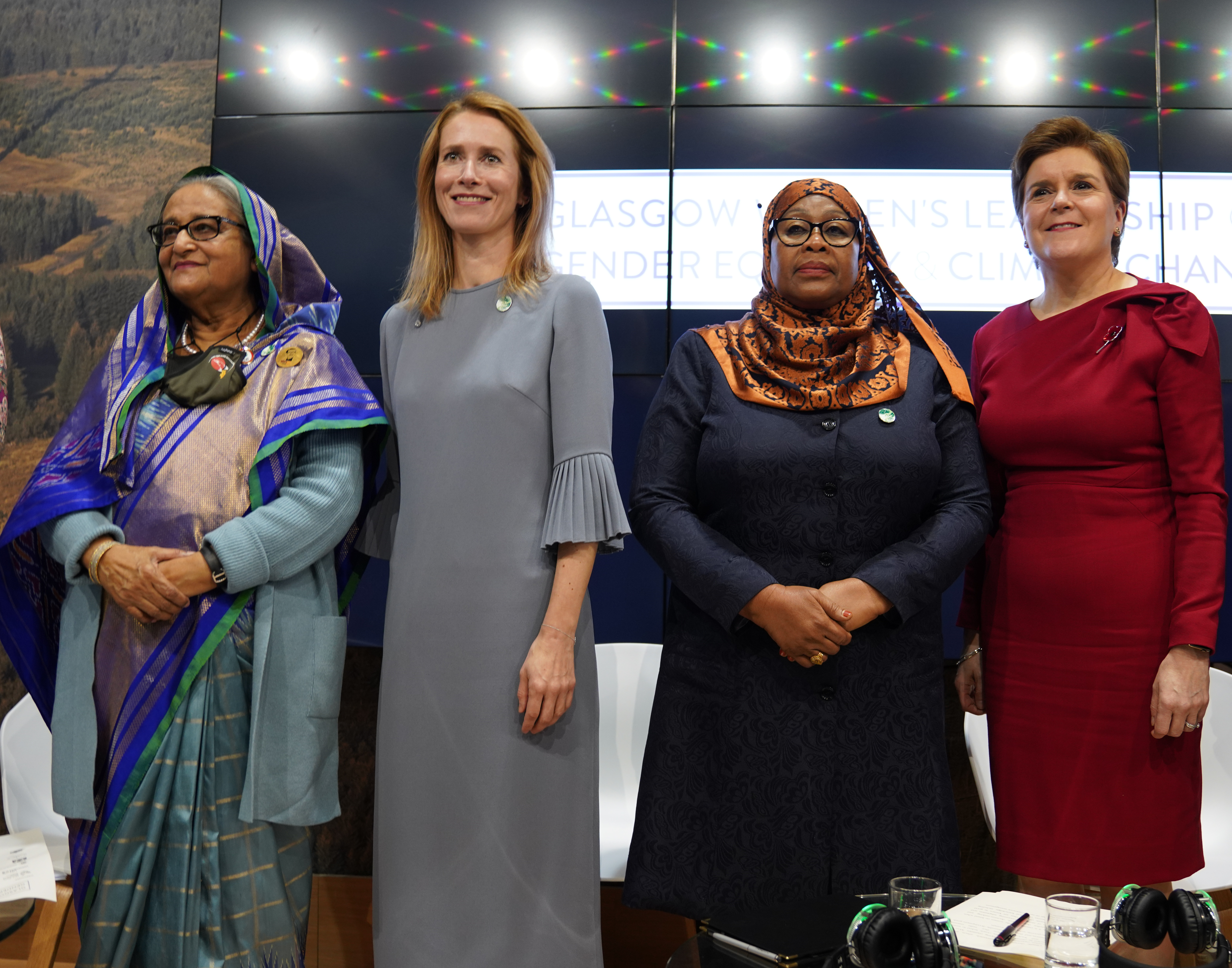
From left to right: Bangladeshi Prime Minister Sheikh Hasina, Estonian Prime Minister Kaja Kallas, Tanzanian President Samia Suluhu and Scottish First Minister Nicola Sturgeon at COP26

Before the summit councils in and around Glasgow pledged to plant 18 million trees during the following decade: the Clyde Climate Forest (CCF) is projected to increase tree coverage in the urban areas of the Greater Glasgow region to 20%.

In September 2021, the conference was urged by Climate Action Network to ensure attendees would be able to attend in spite of travel restrictions related to the COVID-19 pandemic. In the months before the conference, the British government had restrictions on travel from certain countries in place, and COVID passports were required in certain venues. Critics suggested unequal deployment of COVID-19 vaccines worldwide could exclude the participation of representatives of poorer countries most affected by climate change. The UK subsequently relaxed travel rules for delegations. Only four Pacific Islands nations sent delegations due to COVID-19 travel restrictions, with most island nations compelled to send smaller teams than they otherwise would have. Organizers have in place numerous COVID-19 rules for attendees, dependent on vaccination status.

On 4 June 2021, a nighttime light projection onto the Tolbooth Steeple was installed, under the Climate Clock initiative. The projected Deadline and Lifeline statistics count the time window before 1.5 °C warming would become inevitable, and the percentage of global energy delivered through renewables, respectively. The Scottish Events Campus (SEC), known as the Blue Zone, temporarily became United Nations territory: the other main venue is the Green Zone at Glasgow Science Centre.

The summit was described as receiving "the cleanest electricity in the UK", as 70% was supplied from low-carbon nuclear power from plants in Torness and Hunterston B, while the rest mostly came from wind power.

=== Medical cover ===
The provision of medical services for the event was provided by BASICS Scotland, Amvale Medical and the Scottish Ambulance Service. The medical centre was visited by both Scottish National Clinical Director Jason Leitch and Scottish Health Secretary Humza Yousaf during the conference.

=== Attendees ===
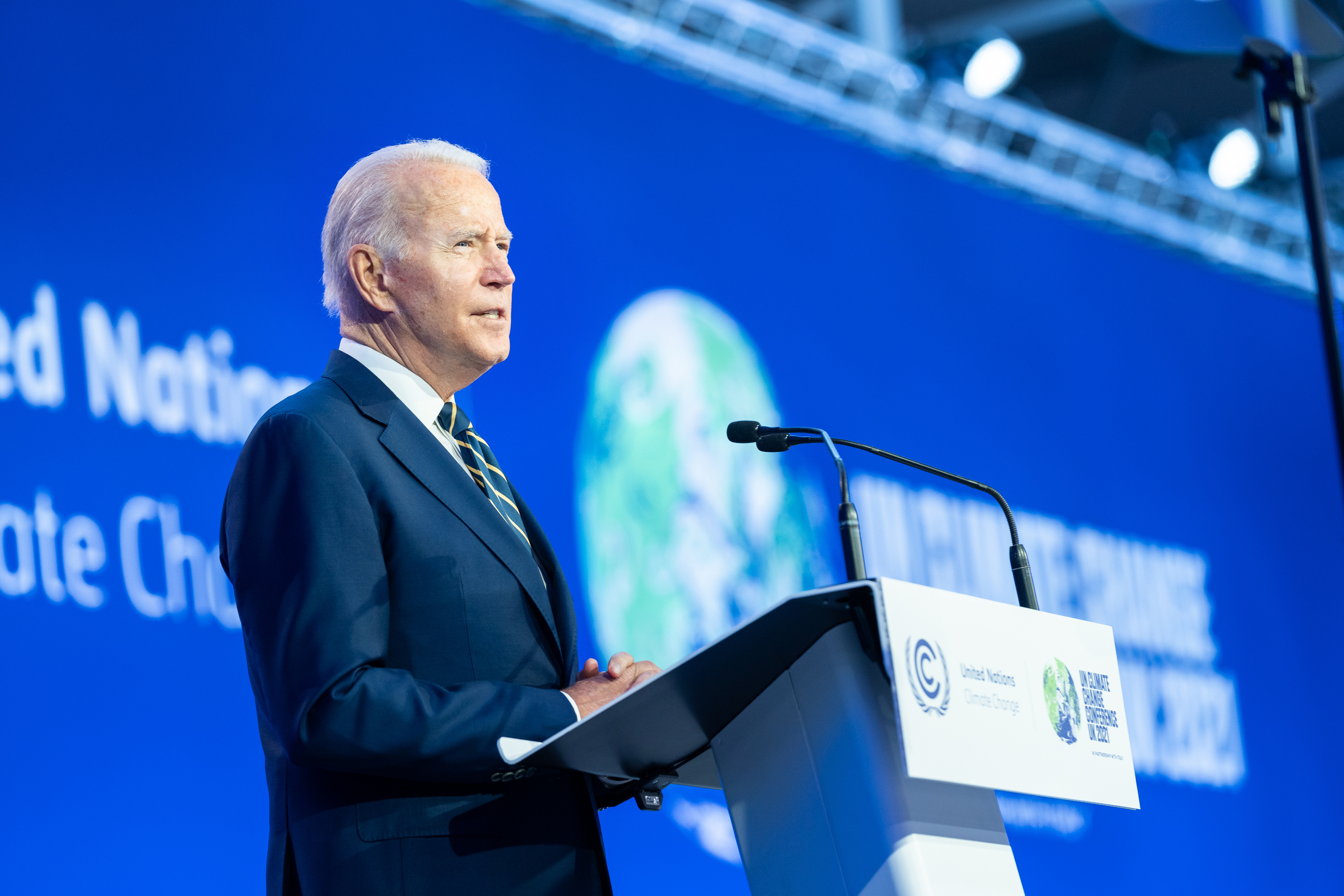
US President Joe Biden at the opening ceremony

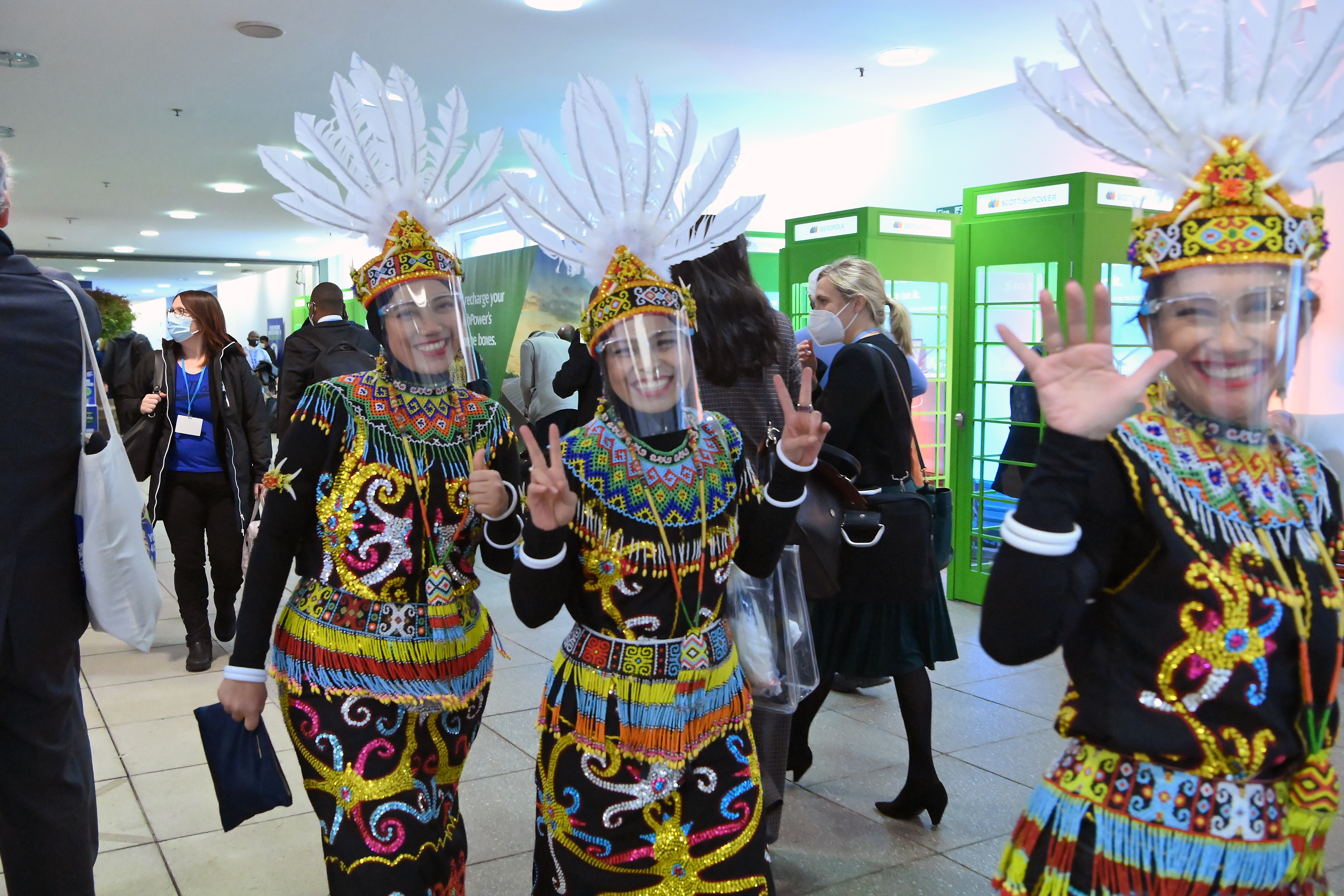
Indonesian attendees in traditional dress, on the first day of the conference

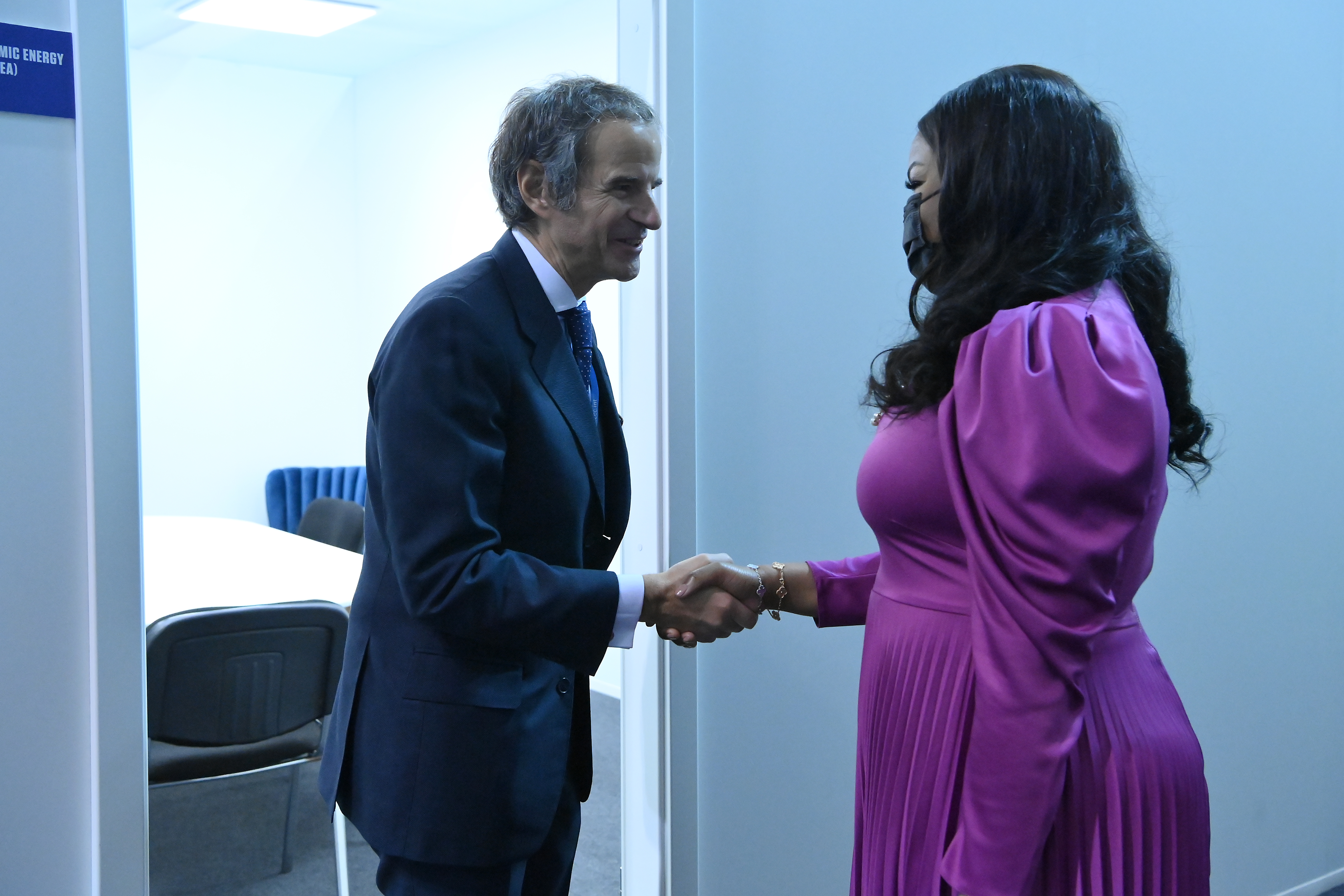
IAEA Director General Rafael Mariano Grossi meeting with CEO and Special Representative of the UNSG for Sustainable Energy for all and Co-Chair on UN Energy Damilola Ogunbiyi

Twenty-five thousand delegates from nearly 200 countries were expected to attend, and around 120 heads of state came. Among the attendees were UN secretary-general António Guterres, United States president Joe Biden, Canadian prime minister Justin Trudeau, Dutch prime minister Mark Rutte, Egyptian president Abdel Fattah el-Sisi, European Commission president Ursula von der Leyen, French president Emmanuel Macron, German chancellor Angela Merkel, Spanish prime minister Pedro Sánchez, Indian prime minister Narendra Modi, Indonesian president Joko Widodo, Israeli prime minister Naftali Bennett, Japanese prime minister Fumio Kishida, Nigerian president Muhammadu Buhari, Polish prime minister Mateusz Morawiecki, Swedish prime minister Stefan Löfven, and Ukrainian president Volodymyr Zelenskyy Former United States president Barack Obama and English broadcaster and natural historian David Attenborough, who was named COP26 People's Advocate, spoke at the summit.

Australian prime minister Scott Morrison spoke. Czech prime minister Andrej Babiš denounced the proposed European Union Fit for 55 laws, part of the European Green Deal, saying that the bloc "can achieve nothing without the participation of the largest polluters such as China or the USA".

Prince Charles addressed the opening ceremony in person. Queen Elizabeth, having been advised to rest by doctors, addressed the conference by video message. Bill Gates called for a "green industrial revolution" to beat the climate crisis.

The fossil fuel industry was the largest delegation at the conference, with 503 people accredited.

=== Non-attendees ===
In October 2021, China's leader Xi Jinping announced he would not be attending the conference in person and instead delivered a written address as the organizers did not provide an opportunity for a video address. With greenhouse gas emissions by China being the world's largest, Reuters said this made it less likely the conference would result in a significant climate deal. However, a Chinese delegation led by climate change envoy Xie Zhenhua did attend. The 2021 global energy crisis intensified pressures on China ahead of the summit. The prime ministers or heads of state of South Africa, Russia, Saudi Arabia, Iran, Mexico, Brazil, Turkey, Malaysia and Vatican City also did not attend the meeting.

Russian president Vladimir Putin said his non-attendance was due to concerns relating to the COVID-19 pandemic. Iranian president Ebrahim Raisi did not attend; a formal request had been made by Struan Stevenson and Iranian exiles of the National Council of Resistance of Iran to the Scotland police, to arrest Raisi for crimes against humanity if he attended based on the legal concept of universal jurisdiction. Saudi crown prince Mohammed bin Salman also did not attend the summit. Brazilian president Jair Bolsonaro, who faced international condemnation over rising deforestation of the Amazon rainforest, also decided not to attend the summit personally.

The non-attendance of both Putin and Xi received criticism from U.S. president Joe Biden and former American president Barack Obama.

Myanmar and Afghanistan were entirely absent; both countries had their UN-recognized governments ousted militarily in 2021. The Myanmar military junta was blocked from entry to the summit. Six exiled Afghan climate experts had their applications rejected by the UNFCCC. Additionally, the island nation of Kiribati did not send participants, while fellow island nations Vanuatu and Samoa registered but did not send a delegation.

== Ratchet mechanism ==
Under the Paris Agreement, countries submitted pledges called nationally determined contributions, to limit their greenhouse gas emissions. Under the framework of the Paris Agreement, each country is expected to submit enhanced nationally determined contributions every five years, to ratchet up the ambition to mitigate climate change. When the Paris Agreement was signed at COP21, the conference of 2020 was set to be the first ratcheting up. Even though the 2020 conference was postponed to 2021 due to the COVID-19 pandemic, dozens of countries still had not updated their pledges by early October 2021. Collective progress towards implementation of the Paris Agreement in mitigation, adaptation and finance flows and means of implementation and support will be measured by global stocktakes, the first of which is due to be completed in 2023.

== Outcomes ==
On 13 November 2021, the participating 197 countries agreed to a new deal, known as the Glasgow Climate Pact, aimed at staving off dangerous climate change.

The pact "Reaffirms the Paris Agreement temperature goal of holding the increase in the global average temperature to well below 2 °C above pre-industrial levels and pursuing efforts to limit the temperature increase to 1.5 °C above pre-industrial levels" and "Recognizes that limiting global warming to 1.5 °C requires rapid, deep and sustained reductions in global greenhouse gas emissions, including reducing global carbon dioxide emissions by 45 per cent by 2030 relative to the 2010 level and to net zero around midcentury, as well as deep reductions in other greenhouse gases." However, achieving the target is not ensured, as with existing pledges the emissions in the year 2030 will be 14% higher than in 2010.

The final agreement explicitly mentions coal, which is the single biggest contributor to climate change. Previous COP agreements have not mentioned coal, oil or gas, or even fossil fuels in general, as a driver, or major cause of climate change, making the Glasgow Climate Pact the first ever climate deal to explicitly plan to reduce unabated coal power. The wording in the agreement refers to an intention to "phase down" use of unabated coal power, rather than to phase it out. From this wording it implicitly follows that utilizing coal power with "abation" (net-zero emission), e.g. by neutralizing the resulting carbon dioxide via the CO_{2}-to-stone process, need not be reduced. However, this carbon capture and storage is too expensive for most coal fired power stations.

Over 140 countries pledged to reach net-zero emissions. This includes 90% of global GDP.

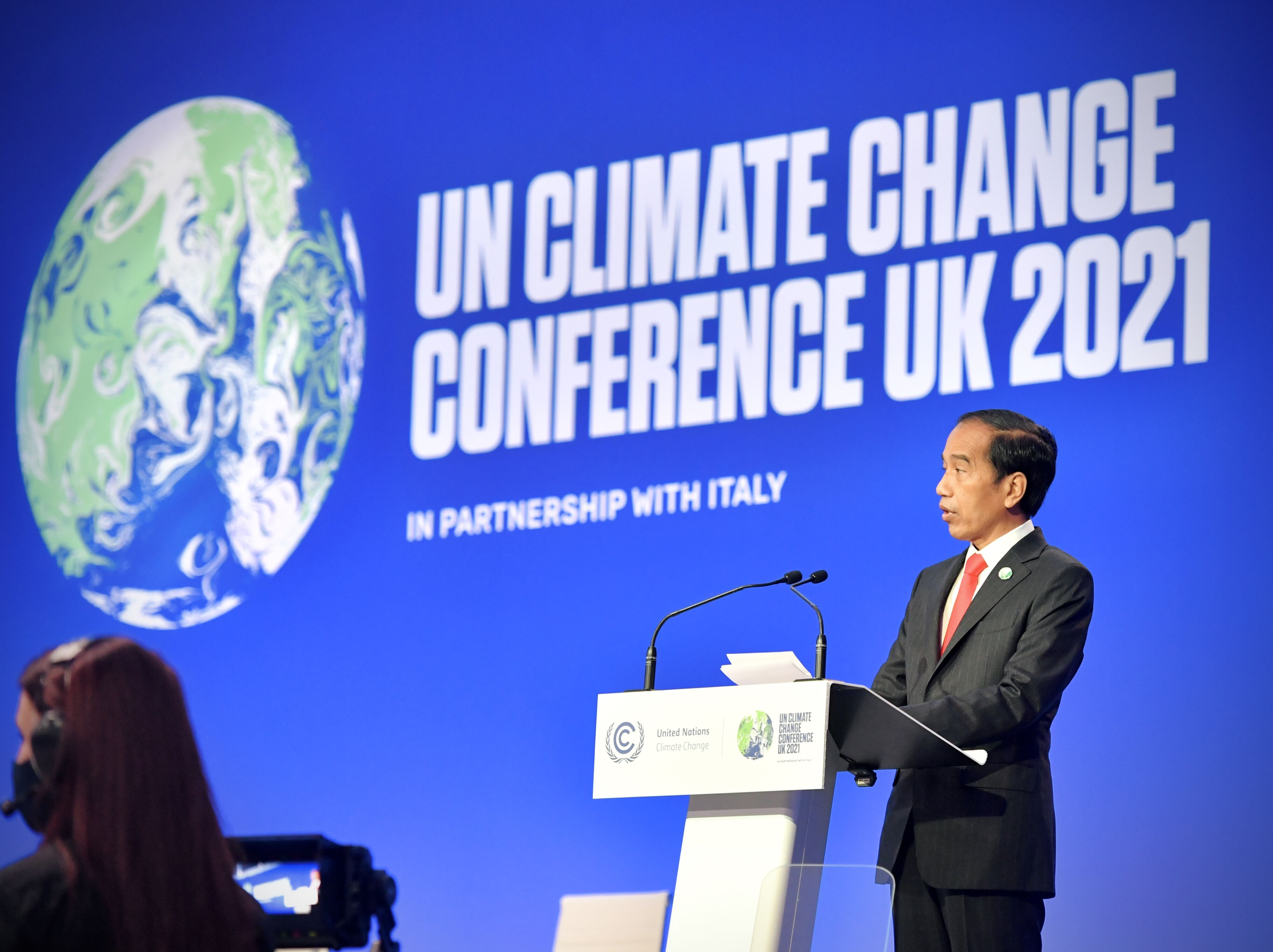
Indonesian President Joko Widodo promised to end and reverse deforestation in Indonesia by 2030.

More than 100 countries, including Brazil, pledged to reverse deforestation by 2030.

The final text of the Glasgow Climate Pact included a call to "accelerating efforts towards... phase-out of inefficient fossil fuel subsidies". 34 countries with several banks and financial agencies pledged to stop international funding for "unabated fossil fuel energy sector by the end of 2022, except in limited and clearly defined circumstances that are consistent with a 1.5°C warming limit and the goals of the Paris Agreement" and increase financing of more sustainable projects, including Canada—the main provider of such finances, France, Germany, Italy and Spain—the biggest financers in European Union.

More than 40 countries pledged to move away from coal.

The United States and China reached an agreement about cooperation on measures to stop climate change, including lowering methane emissions, phasing out the use of coal, and forest conservation.

39 countries and institutions signed the Glasgow Statement, an international agreement to shift international public finance away from fossil fuels towards clean energy. If implemented properly, the Glasgow Statement will shift $28 billion per year from fossil fuels to clean energy.

India promised to draw half of its energy requirement from renewable sources by 2030 and achieve carbon neutrality by 2070.

Governments of 24 developed countries and a group of major car manufacturers such as GM, Ford, Volvo, BYD Auto, Jaguar Land Rover, and Mercedes-Benz have committed to "work towards all sales of new cars and vans being zero emission globally by 2040, and by no later than 2035 in leading markets". Major car manufacturing nations like China, the US, Japan, Germany, and South Korea, as well as Toyota, Volkswagen, Nissan-Renault-Mitsubishi, Stellantis, Honda, and Hyundai had not signed up to the pledge.

New pledges for financial help for climate change mitigation and adaptation were announced.

Climate Action Tracker on 9 November 2021, described the results as follows: the global temperature will rise by 2.7 °C by the end of the century with current policies. The temperature will rise by 2.4 °C if only the pledges for 2030 are implemented, by 2.1 °C if the long-term targets are also achieved and by 1.8 °C if all the announced targets are fully achieved.

The Glasgow Financial Alliance for Net Zero (GFANZ) announced that financial institutions controlling $130 trillion were now signed up to 'net zero' emissions pledges by 2050.

== Negotiations ==
The world leaders' summit was on 1 and 2 November, with each leader giving a national statement.

An important goal of the conference organizers is to keep a 1.5 °C (2.7 °F) temperature rise within reach. According to the BBC, negotiators who may be key to the dealmaking include Xie Zhenhua, Ayman Shasly, Sheikh Hasina and Teresa Ribera.

China said it aims to peak CO_{2} emissions before 2030 and to become carbon neutral by 2060. It was asked to set a clear earlier date as this would have a very large "positive impact" on the Paris Agreement targets. Officials later said the 2030 target was something to "strive to" and not something to be ensured.

=== Deforestation ===
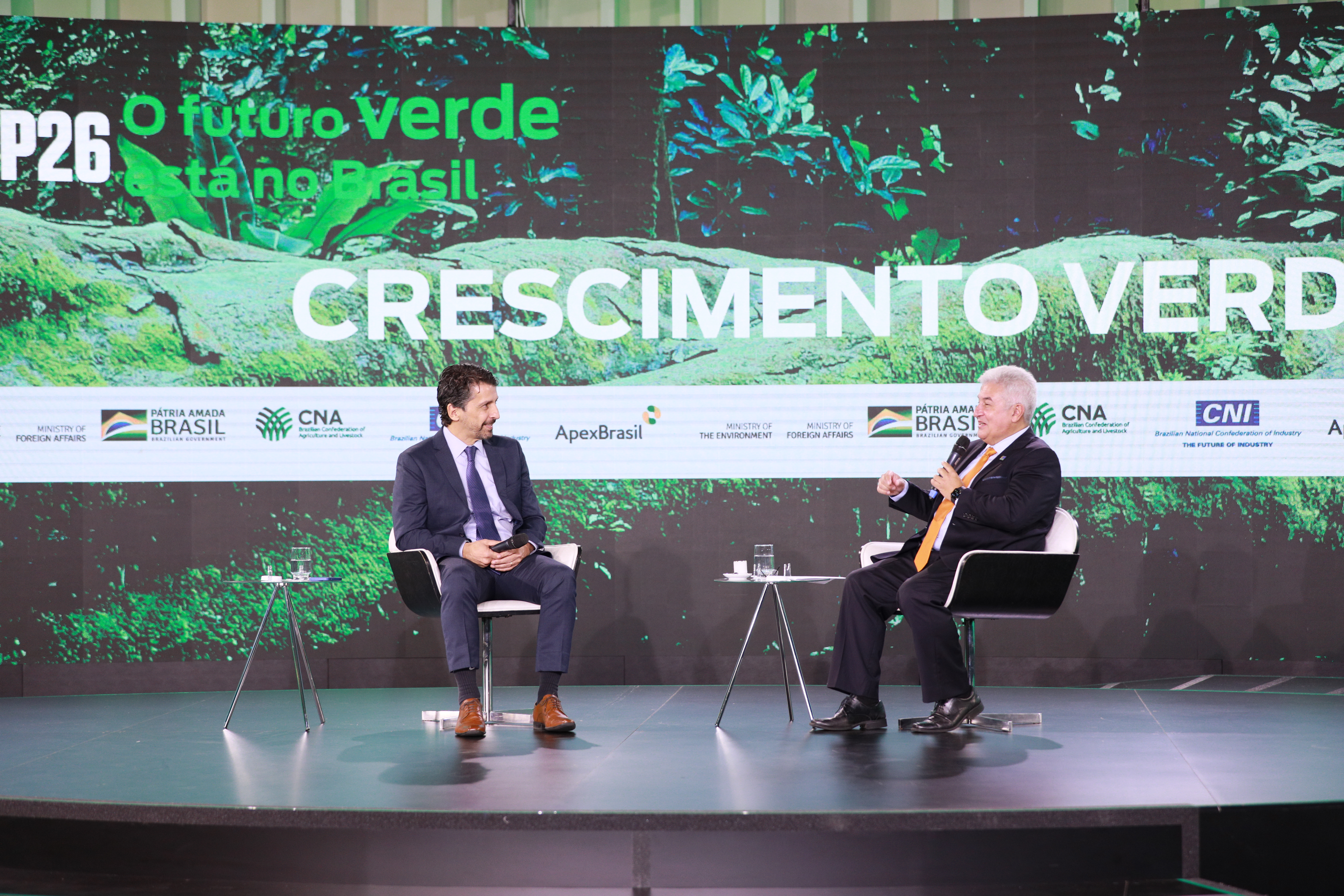
Brazil, home to 60% of the Amazon rainforest, promised to halt and reverse deforestation by 2030. (National Confederation of Industry virtual cast from Brasília on 3 September 2021)

Leaders of more than 100 countries with around 85% of the world's forests, including Canada, Russia, the Democratic Republic of the Congo and the United States, agreed to end deforestation by 2030, improving on a similar 2014 agreement by now including Brazil, Indonesia, businesses and more financial resources. Signatories of the 2014 agreement, the New York Declaration on Forests, pledged to half deforestation by 2020 and end it by 2030; however, in the 2014–2020 period deforestation increased.

Indonesia's environment minister Siti Nurbaya Bakar stated that "forcing Indonesia to zero deforestation in 2030 is clearly inappropriate and unfair".

=== Article 6 ===
Article 6 of the Paris Agreement, which describes rules for an international carbon market (such as for trees in the deforestation agreement) and other forms of international cooperation, is being discussed as it is the last piece of the rulebook remaining to be finalized. Although the parties have agreed in principle to avoid double counting of emission reduction across more than one country's greenhouse gas inventory, exactly how much double counting will actually occur remains unclear. Carrying forward pre-2020 Kyoto carbon credits will be discussed, but is highly unlikely to be agreed. Therefore, Article 6 rules could make a big difference to future emissions.

=== Finance ===
Climate finance for adaptation and mitigation was one of the principal topics of negotiation. Poor countries want more money for adaptation, whereas donors prefer to finance mitigation as that has a chance of making a profit. Appointed to the role of Climate Finance Adviser was Mark Carney, former Governor of the Bank of England. The Paris agreement included US$100 billion annually in finance by 2020 for developing countries. However, wealthy countries failed to live up to that promise, with members of the OECD behind in their commitments and unlikely to reach the agreed amount before 2023. A group of large finance companies committed to net zero portfolios and loan books by 2050. Scotland became the first country to contribute to a loss and damage fund.

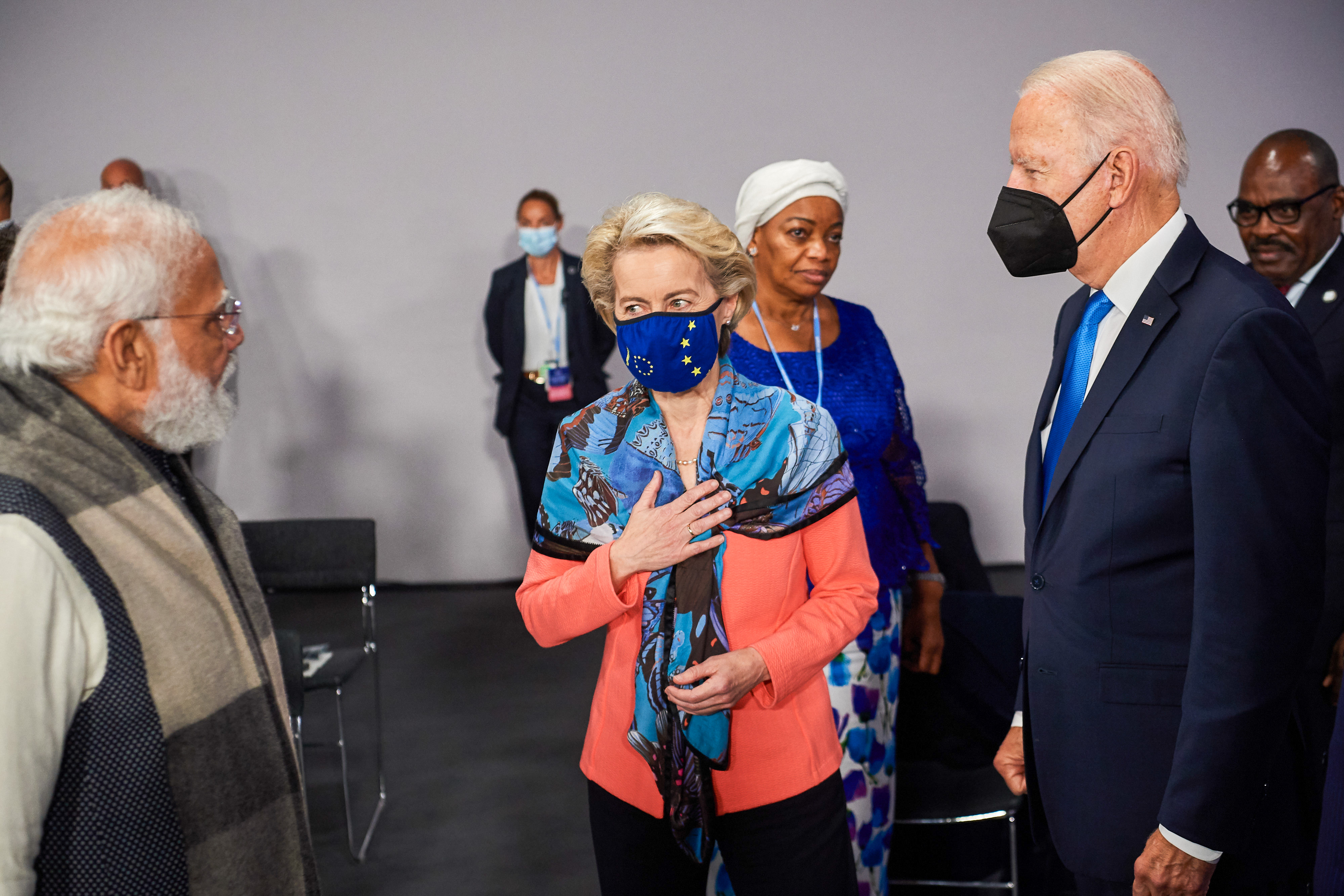
Indian Prime Minister Narendra Modi, European Commission President Ursula von der Leyen and US President Joe Biden at COP26

=== Coal ===
South Africa is set to receive $8.5 billion to end its reliance on coal, details are sparse regarding capping mines, exports and local community support for the workers in the industry. Countries including Chile, Poland, Ukraine, South Korea, Indonesia and Vietnam also agreed to phase out coal in the 2030s for major economies, and the 2040s for poorer nations. These nations include some of the world's most intensive users of coal. However, they do not include the world's largest users of the fuel, China, India, and the United States of America. Japan is to invest $100 million in the transformation of fossil-fired plants into ones based on ammonia and hydrogen fuel.

=== Methane ===
The US and many other countries agreed to limit methane emissions. More than 80 countries signed up to a global methane pledge, agreeing to cut emissions by 30% by the end of the decade. The US and European leaders say tackling the potent greenhouse gas is crucial to keeping warming limited to 1.5 °C (2.7 °F). Australia, China, Russia, India and Iran did not sign the deal, but it is hoped more countries will join later.

Russia demanded sanction relief on green investment projects for energy companies such as Gazprom. Russia's climate envoy Ruslan Edelgeriyev accused Western countries of hypocrisy for urging Russia "to reduce methane leakages and yet we have Gazprom under sanctions".

=== Net-zero targets ===
Many attendees committed to net-zero carbon emissions, with India and Japan making specific commitments at the conference. India, the third-largest emitter of carbon dioxide by jurisdiction, set the latest target date planning to be net-zero by 2070. Japan is to offer up to $10 billion in additional funding to support decarbonization in Asia. Earlier in October, China—the largest emitter of carbon dioxide by jurisdiction—had committed to net-zero carbon emissions by 2060, and it was believed by the British government that India would issue a similar commitment. However, this was the first time that a date for carbon neutrality had been given as part of India's climate policy. Green hydrogen has emerged as one of the major areas where companies can collaborate to help decarbonize hard to abate industries.

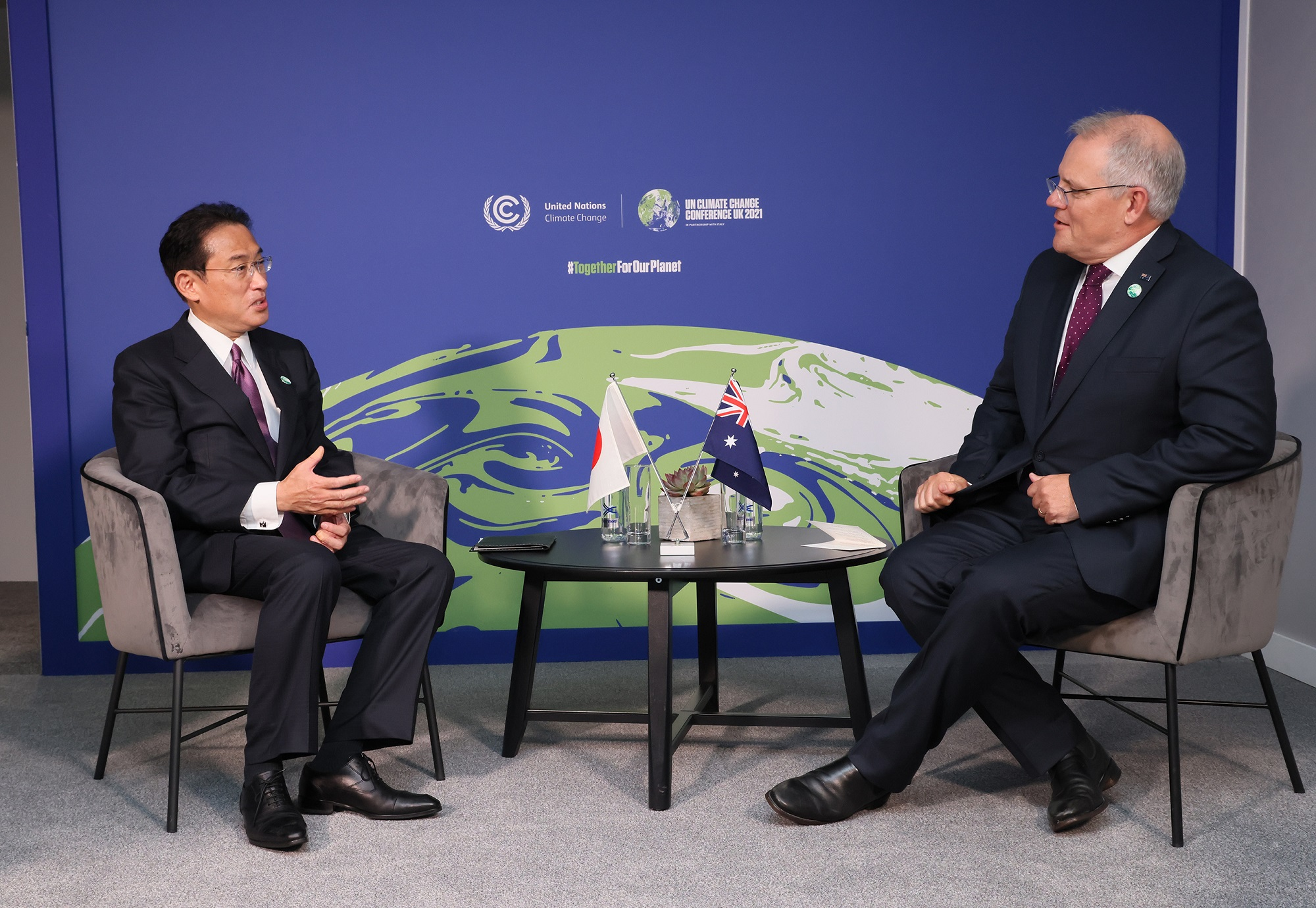
Japanese Prime Minister Fumio Kishida and Australian Prime Minister Scott Morrison at COP26

=== Adaptation ===
Big city mayors concerned about climate—the C40 Cities Climate Leadership Group—such as Istanbul Mayor Ekrem İmamoğlu, called for more urban climate adaptation, especially in low-income countries.

=== Socioeconomic transformation ===
==== Agriculture ====
45 countries, including the UK, U.S., Japan, Germany, India, Indonesia, Morocco, Vietnam, Philippines, Gabon, Ethiopia, Ghana and Uruguay, pledged to give more than $4 billion for transition to sustainable agriculture. The organization "Slow Food" expressed concern about the effectivity of the spendings, as they concentrate on technological solutions and reforestation in place of "a holistic agroecology that transforms food from a mass-produced commodity into part of a sustainable system that works within natural boundaries".

==== Transportation ====
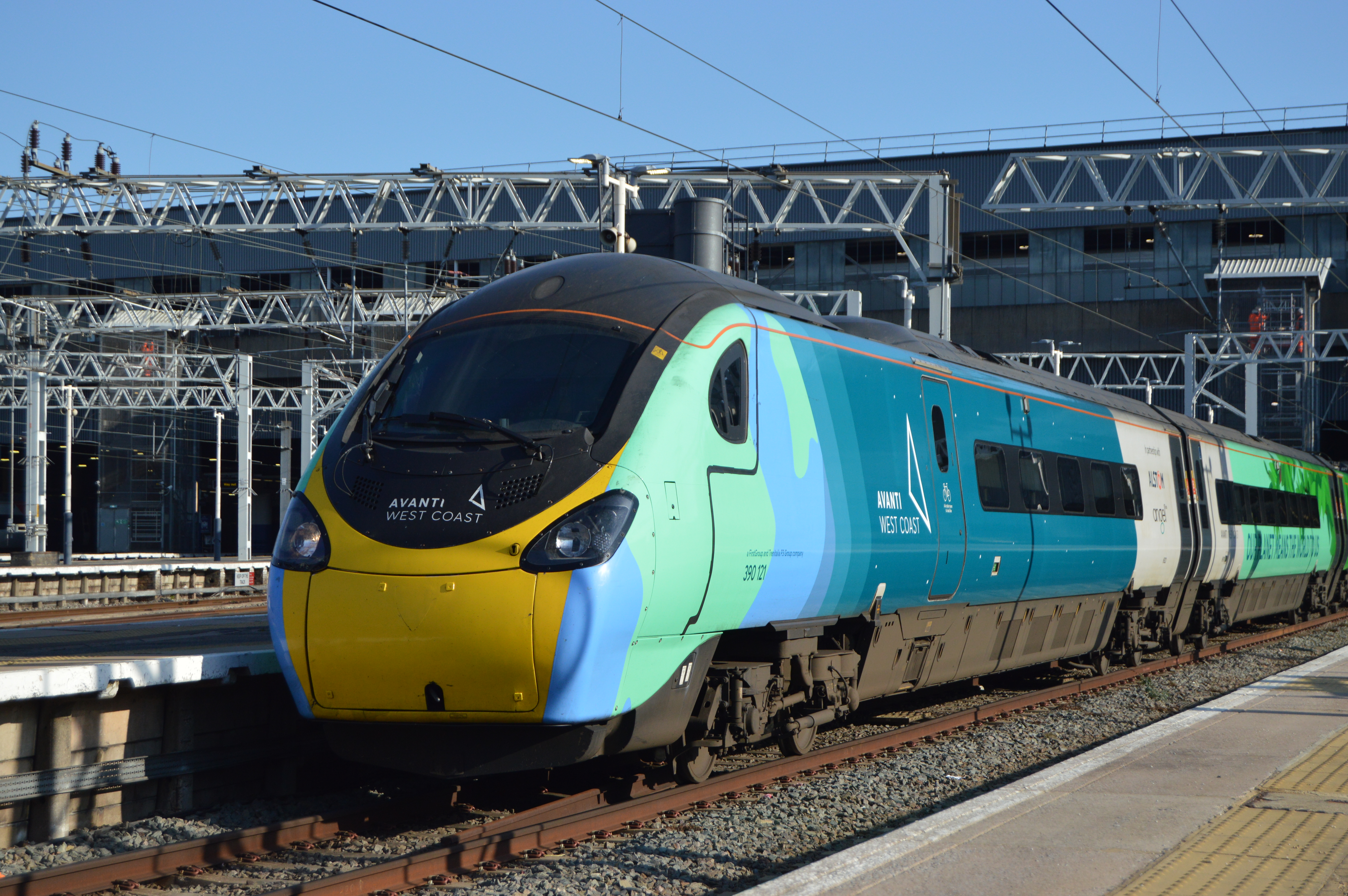
Avanti West Coast Class 390 in COP26 Climate livery departs from London Euston.

The conference placed electric vehicles and pledges for vehicle electrification at the centre, including the electric OX truck, while, according to activists, better investment and political will for sustainable transport modes have not been forced through with the focus not being on public transport and cycling.

==== Fossil fuels ====
A draft text published on 10 November asked governments to accelerate phase-outs and desubsidization of fossil fuels, the largest source of (anthropogenic) global greenhouse gas emissions, but was opposed by several countries with large fossil fuels based economic sectors.

== Reception ==
=== Beforehand and at the outset ===
Business leaders and politicians including Jeff Bezos, Prince Charles, Boris Johnson, Joe Biden and Angela Merkel who travelled to Glasgow in private airplanes were accused of hypocrisy by commentators and campaigners. Event planners, however, insisted that the conference would be carbon-neutral. Around 400 private jets arrived at Glasgow for the talks.

In October 2021, the BBC reported that a huge leak of documents revealed that Saudi Arabia, Japan and Australia were among countries asking the UN to play down the need to move rapidly away from fossil fuels. It also showed that some wealthy nations (including Switzerland and Australia) were questioning paying more to poorer states to move to greener technologies. The BBC reported that the lobbying raised questions for the COP26 climate summit. The Australian government has been criticized for hosting a fossil fuel company at the summit, not enhancing its ambitions closer to its capacities, not pledging to reduce methane emissions and not pledging to phase out coal.

In an interview shortly before the conference, Greta Thunberg, asked how optimistic she was that the conference could achieve anything, responded "Nothing has changed from previous years really. The leaders will say 'we'll do this and we'll do this, and we will put our forces together and achieve this', and then they will do nothing. Maybe some symbolic things and creative accounting and things that don't really have a big impact. We can have as many COPs as we want, but nothing real will come out of it." Queen Elizabeth II voiced concerns in a private conversation overheard via a hot mic, saying: "It's really irritating when they talk, but they don't do."

COP26 feedback from experts like Edmond Fernandes, Fatemeh Rezaei stated that a public health in all policies approach, built on a singular agenda to strengthen risk reduction initiatives, reduce the disease burden and also equip health systems to handle surge capacities will be critical for sustainability.

=== Protests ===
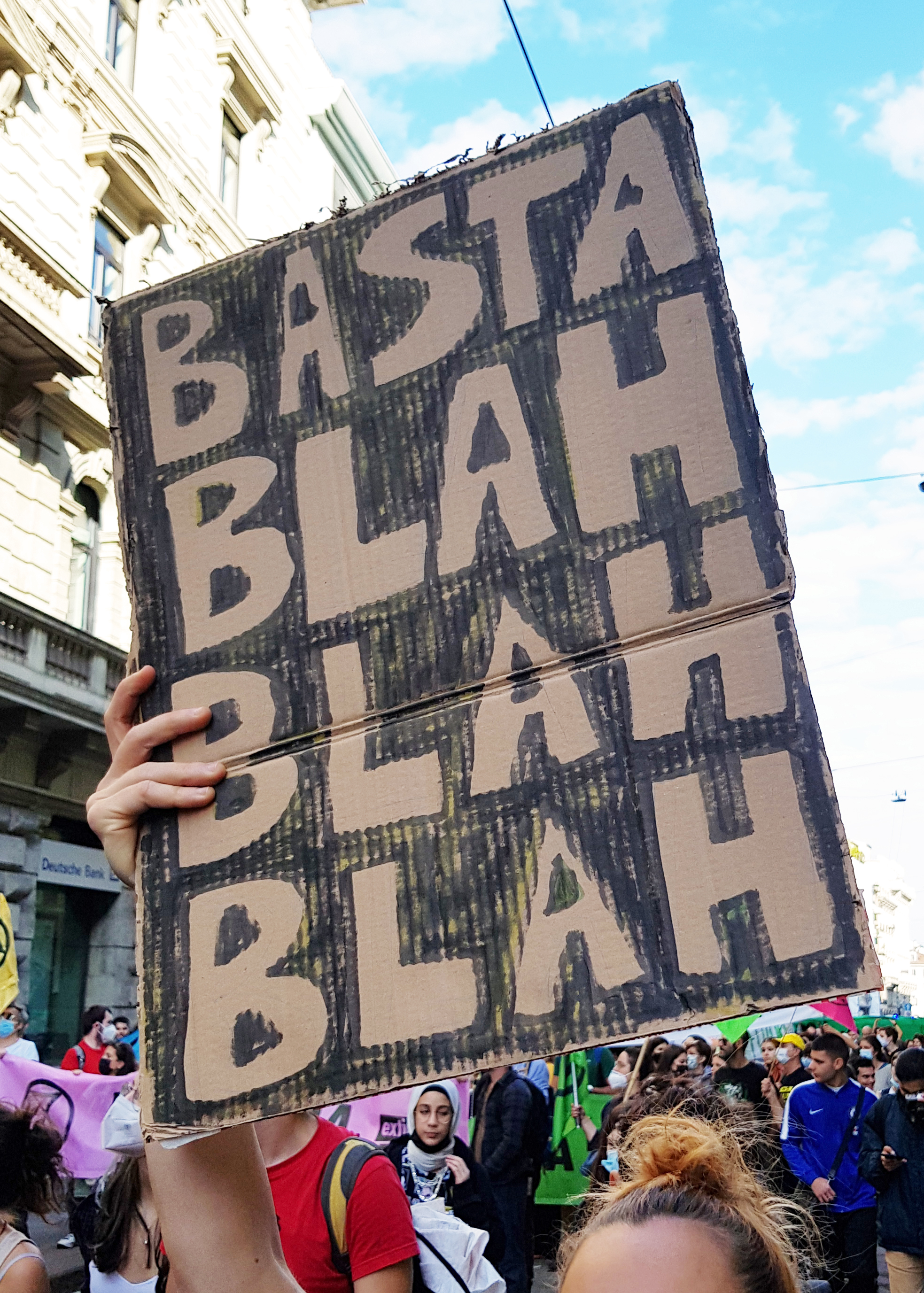
A sign at a Fridays for Future protest in Milan, Italy, on 1 October 2021 (basta means 'enough')

By 1 November, at the outset of the conference, the climate change activist Greta Thunberg criticized the summit at a protest in Glasgow with members from the organization Fridays for Future, saying "This COP26 is so far just like the previous COPs and that has led us nowhere. They have led us nowhere."

On 5 November, a Fridays for Future protest at which Thunberg spoke gathered thousands of people, largely schoolchildren. Attendees supported more immediate and far-reaching action on climate change. Glasgow City Council and most neighbouring councils stated that students would not be punished if parents informed their schools of the absence. On 6 November—the Global Day of Action for Climate Justice—around 100,000 people joined a march in Glasgow, according to BBC News, with coaches and group cycle rides organized for participants to travel from around the United Kingdom. The protests were the largest in Glasgow since anti-Iraq War marches in 2003. A London march drew 10,000 people according to police and 20,000 according to organizers. The Times anticipated that total participants would number over two million. An additional 100 marches took place elsewhere in the country, with a total of 300 protests across 100 countries, according to The Guardian. On 8 November, Fridays for Future activists including Dominika Lasota and Nicole Becker held a protest prior to a speech by former US president Barack Obama, arguing that he had failed to fulfill his promise to provide US$100 billion in climate funding to developing countries. The protestors held banners stating, "Show us the money".

Vanessa Nakate and indigenous activists gave speeches at Glasgow. Issues highlighted by protesters included putting corporate interests at the forefront and politicians' failure to address the climate emergency with the required urgency as well as its underlying causes. Kahnawake Mohawk people, ecology scientists, vegan activists, trade unionists and socialists were present at marches.

Some protesters held up signs calling on the Mexican government to investigate the disappearance of Irma Galindo, an indigenous environmental activist from Oaxaca, who went missing in Mexico City on 27 October.

=== Event organisation ===
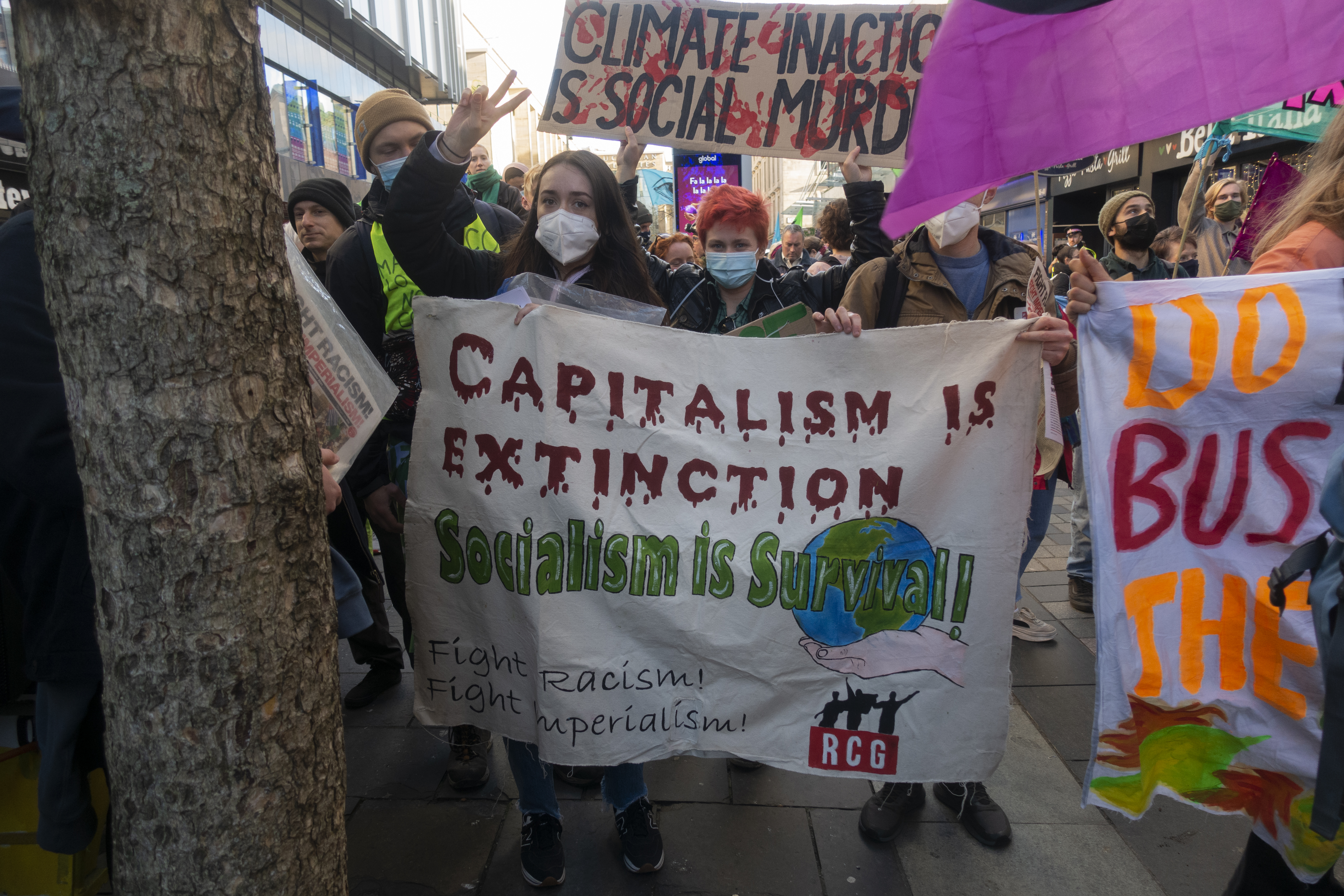
Protesters in Glasgow on 3 October

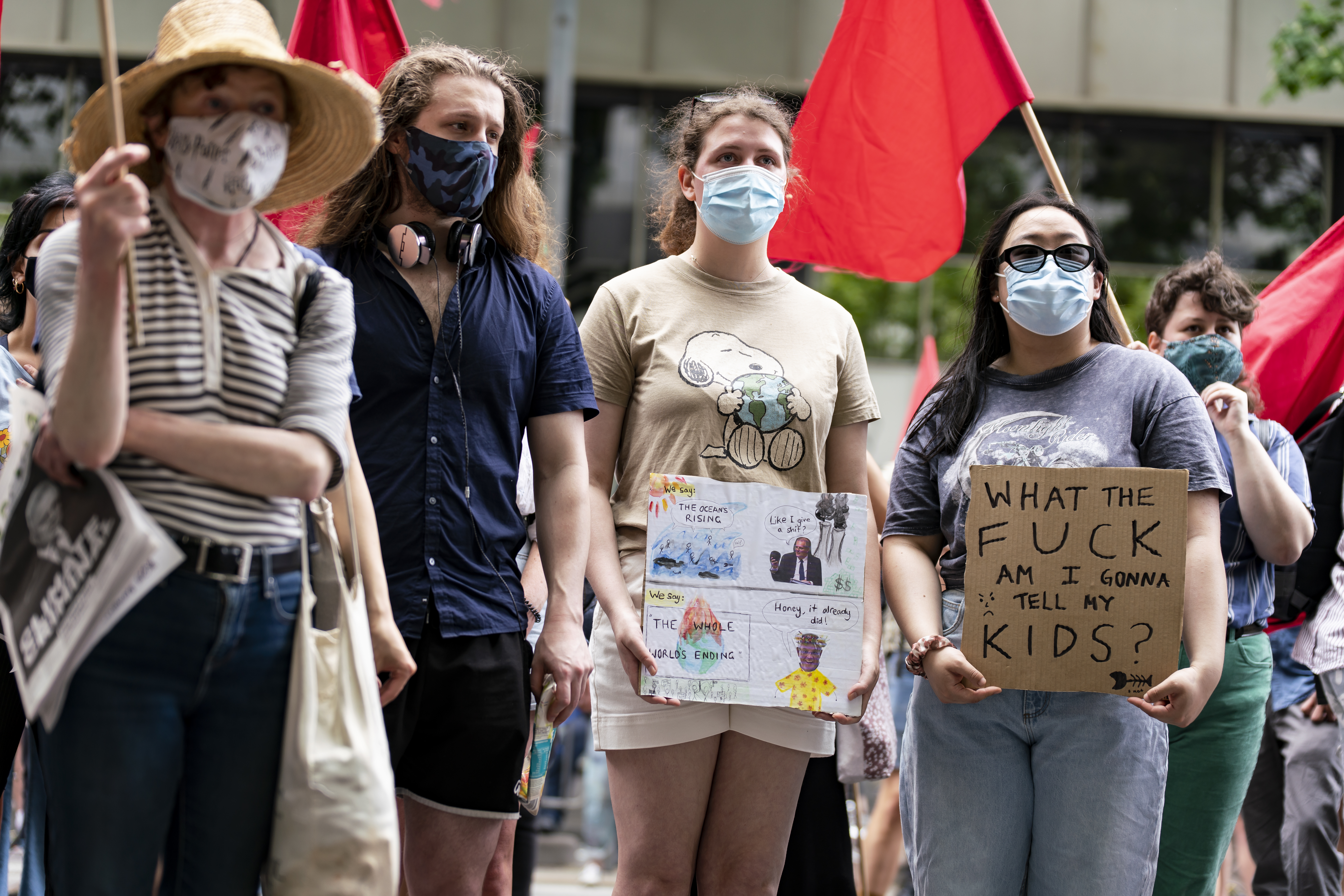
Protesters in Melbourne, Australia, on 6 November, the Global Day of Action for Climate Justice

One intended participant, the Israeli energy minister Karine Elharrar, was unable to attend on 1 November due to wheelchair accessibility issues.

The sustainability of the COP26 menu was criticized by the animal and climate justice group Animal Rebellion, with almost 60% of the menu being meat and dairy based, and dishes labelled as high-carbon being served at food stands. The head of catering at COP26, Lorna Wilson, said that staff had been "working towards" a catering strategy of 95% food from the UK and 5% from abroad. Wilson said the menu was 40% plant-based and 60% vegetarian overall. The event eliminated single-use cups and plastics.

There was concern about the inclusion and influence of large delegations of industries, particularly big polluting companies, and financial organizations involved in the causes of greenhouse gas emissions at the conference.

=== Further criticism ===
Further criticisms of the results include that it needs not only commitments but also clear directions for mitigation and adaptation and robust mechanisms put in place for the relevant parties to be held accountable to their commitments. CNBC, BBC, Axios and CBS News found that financial firms are not prevented from making private investments in fossil fuels, that there is a lack of focus on and transparency of the quality—rather than quantity or amounts—of pledges, that ending deforestation by 2030 is too late, that countries need to publish comprehensive policy-plans on how they will achieve their targets, and that the pledges are not mandatory, with no punishment mechanisms getting established at the conference and apparent content with a "self-regulation" approach for relevant organizations. According to critics, such issues could turn the conference into a "greenwashing" event of empty promises.

There is a criticism about the lack of people from most affected people and areas. Kaossara Sani became one of the persons who came from this place and sent her criticism by sending her manifesto to Forbes about what happened in Sahel and her criticism to COP26.

Academicians and practitioners on the field have floated several missing links of COP26 particularly the approach to climate change, disasters and public health consequences stemming from the meeting and how the neglect of healthcare will impact the Asia Pacific Region as a whole.

=== Misinformation ===
According to the Institute for Strategic Dialogue and a network of journalism organizations, the COP meeting became a target for climate misinformation, prominently "narratives of delay".

=== Results ===
On 9 November, Climate Action Tracker reported that the global human civilization is on track for a 2.7 °C temperature increase in the Earth system by the end of the century with current policies. The temperature will rise by 2.4 °C if the pledges for 2030 will be implemented, by 2.1 °C if the long-term targets will be implemented also and by 1.8 °C if in addition all the targets in discussion will be fully implemented. Current targets for 2030 remain "totally inadequate". Coal and natural gas consumption are the main cause for the gap between pledges and policies. They assessed pledges by 40 countries that account for 85% of pledged net-zero emissions cuts and found that only polities responsible for 6% of global greenhouse gas emissions—EU, UK, Chile and Costa Rica—have pledged a set of targets that they rated to be "acceptable" for comprehensiveness and for having a published detailed official policy‑plan that describes the steps and ways by which these targets could be realized.

On 10 November, it was reported that the United States and China agreed on a framework to reduce carbon emissions by cooperating on measures to lower the use of methane, phase out the use of coal and increased protection of forests.

On 11 November, the Like-Minded Developing Countries (LMDC), a group of 22 countries including China and India, asked for the commitment to mitigation to be entirely removed from the draft text, as they apparently argue that developing countries should not be held to the same deadlines as wealthier nations. The request was criticized as illogical and self-defeating as it would end up harming people in developing countries the most and an article in the Daily Beast described the request as an attempt by China to sabotage the draft commitment. China was responsible for around 27% of the world's current GHG emissions in 2019.

== See also ==
- 2022 United Nations Climate Change Conference
- Politics of climate change
- Climate change in the United Kingdom
- Climate change in Scotland
- 2021 in climate change
