= Looney =

Looney or loonie may refer to:

== People ==
- Looney (surname)
- Looney or lunatic, antiquated term for mentally ill person
- LoOney (born 1980), Serbian singer-songwriter, actor, director and comic artist
- Looney, nickname of William Hinde (1900–1981), British Army major general
- Looney, nickname of Rudy Williams (1909–1954), American jazz saxophonist

== Other uses ==
- The Looney: An Irish Fantasy, a 1987 comic novel by Spike Milligan
- "Looney", an early version of the poem "The Sea-Bell" by J. R. R. Tolkien
- Loonies, 2002 Dutch family film
- Loonie, common name for the Canadian one dollar coin, which bears an image of the loon
- Looney Labs, a small company known for the Fluxx line of card games
- Looney Tunes, a Warner Bros. animated cartoon franchise

== See also ==
- Luni (disambiguation)
- Loney (disambiguation)
