= Looney (surname) =

Looney is a surname. Notable people with the surname include:

- Andy Looney (born 1963), American game designer
- Bernard Looney (born 1969/1970), Irish business executive
- J. Thomas Looney (1870–1944), originator of the Oxfordian theory regarding the authorship of Shakespeare's plays
- James Looney (born 1995), American football player
- Jim Looney (born 1957), American football player
- Joe Looney (offensive lineman) (born 1990), American football player
- Joe Don Looney (1942–1988), American football player
- John Looney (Cherokee chief) (c. 1782–1846), chief of the Cherokee nation
- John Patrick Looney (1865–1947), American gangster in the Rock Island, Illinois, area during the early 1900s
- Kevon Looney (born 1996), American basketball player
- Lamar Looney (1871-1935), American politician
- William R. Looney III (born 1949), American former Commander, Air Education and Training Command, United States Air Force

== See also ==
- Loney (name)
- Michael O'Looney (born 1965), American business official, former government official, former journalist
