= 15 February 2003 Iraq War protests =

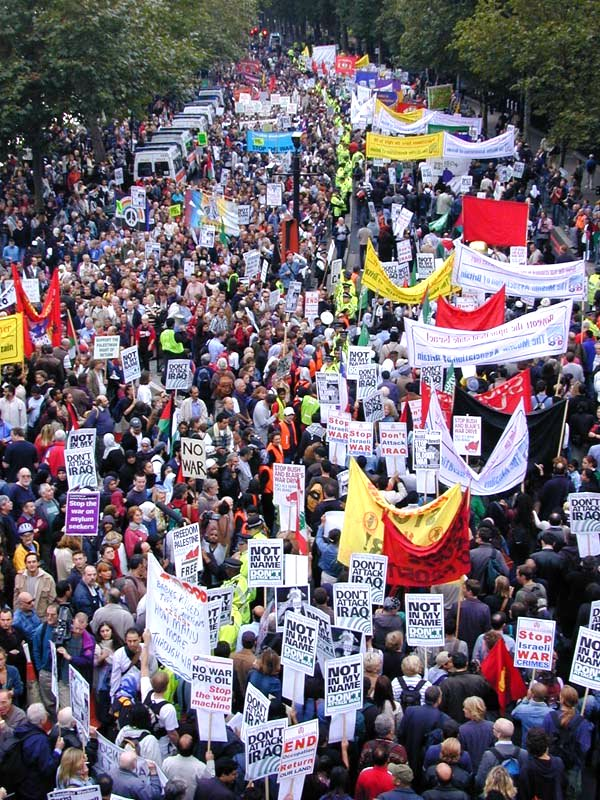
Protest in London

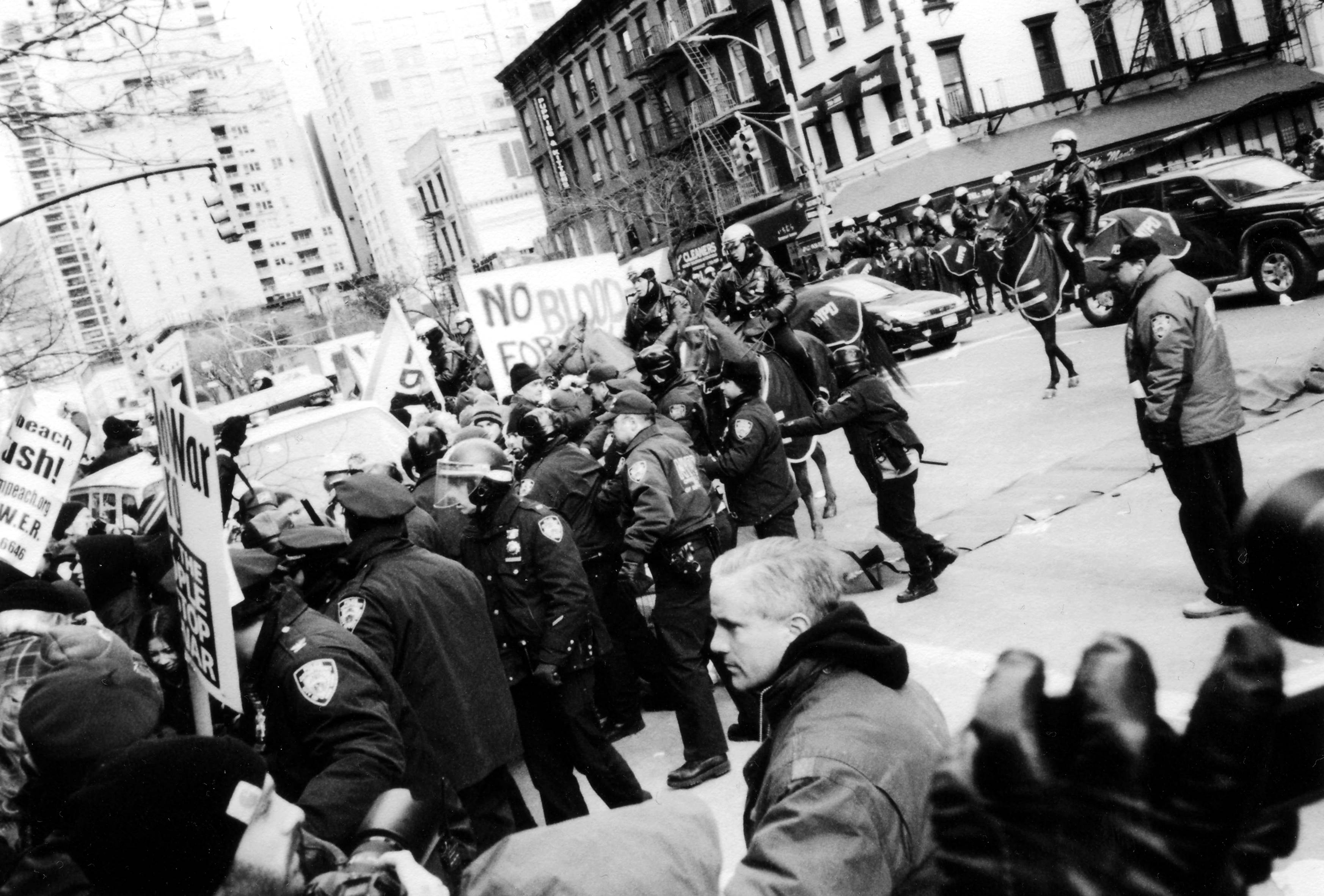
Officers of the NYPD attempt to restrain protesters during an anti-war rally.

On 15 February 2003, a coordinated day of protests was held across the world in which people in more than 600 cities expressed opposition to the imminent Iraq War. It was part of a series of protests and political events that had begun in 2002 and continued as the invasion, war, and occupation took place. The day was described by social movement researchers as "the largest protest event in human history".

According to BBC News, between six and ten million people took part in protests in up to sixty countries over the weekend of 15 and 16 February.

The largest protests took place in Europe. The one in Rome involved around three million people, and is listed in the 2004 Guinness Book of World Records as the largest anti-war rally in history. Madrid hosted the second largest rally with more than 1.5 million people protesting against the invasion of Iraq. In Beijing, three smaller protests were held the following day, attended by foreigners and domestic students.

== Background ==
In 2002, the United States government began to argue for the necessity of invading Iraq. This formally began with a speech by US President George W. Bush to the United Nations General Assembly on 12 September 2002 which argued that the Iraqi government of Saddam Hussein was violating United Nations (UN) resolutions, primarily on weapons of mass destruction, and that this necessitated action.

The proposed war was controversial with many people questioning the motives of the US government and its rationale. One poll which covered 41 countries claimed that less than 10% would support an invasion of Iraq without UN sanction and that half would not support an invasion under any circumstances.

Anti-war groups worldwide organised public protests. According to the French academic Dominique Reynié, between 3 January and 12 April 2003, 36 million people across the globe took part in almost 3,000 anti‑war protests, the demonstrations on 15 February 2003 being the largest and most prolific.

== International coordination ==
The 15 February international protests were unprecedented not only in terms of the size of the demonstrations but also in terms of the international coordination involved. Researchers from the University of Antwerp claim that the day was possible only because it "was carefully planned by an international network of national social movement organizations."

Immanuel Wallerstein has spoken of the international protests as being organised by the forces of "the camps of Porto Alegre and Davos" in reference to the emergence of global social movements who had been organising around international events such as the 2001 World Social Forum in Porto Alegre.

The idea for an international day of demonstrations was first raised by the British anti-capitalist group Globalise Resistance (GR) in the wake of an anti-war demonstration in Britain of 400,000 on 28 September. At the time GR was involved in planning for the Florence European Social Forum (ESF) and brought up the suggestion at an ESF planning meeting. According to GR's Chris Nineham, "There was considerable controversy. Some delegates were worried it would alienate the mainstream of the movement. We, alongside the Italian delegates, had to put up a strong fight to get it accepted."

The proposal was accepted and at the final rally of the ESF, in November 2002, the call officially went out for Europe-wide demonstrations on 15 February 2003. This call was firmed up in December at a planning meeting for the following ESF which took place in Copenhagen in 2003. This meeting was attended by delegates from many European anti-war organisations, the US group United for Peace and Justice, and representatives of groups from the Philippines. The decision was taken to set up a Europe-wide anti-war website and to commit to spreading organisational coordination both within and beyond Europe. An email network connecting the different national organisations across Europe, and eventually also the different US groups, was set up.

In December 2002, the Cairo Anti-war Conference pledged to organize demonstrations in Egypt and the International Campaign Against Aggression on Iraq (which came out of the Cairo conference) sought to co-ordinate more demonstrations across the world. Around this time, the US anti-war group International ANSWER called for actions in North America supporting the proposed protests in Europe.

Another important platform for the spreading call to demonstrate internationally occurred at the World Social Forum in Porto Alegre, Brazil which took place at the end of 2002. European delegates sought to popularize the plan for the increasingly international demonstration. They met with some success, including the organisation of an anti‑war assembly which was attended by almost 1,000 people.

The song "Boom!", by System of a Down, had a music video filmed on the day of the protest, showing the many protest locations and people's opinions on the Iraq War.

== Europe ==
Demonstrations took place across Europe and some of the largest drawing attendance figures in the tens of thousands in many cities. Approximately one-fifth of the total demonstrators worldwide protested in Europe.

=== Alpine countries ===
In Austria, 30,000 people (SW estimate) took to the streets of its capital, Vienna. In Switzerland in order to "concentrate the movement" most activists agreed to organise a single demonstration for the whole country in Bern. On the day roughly 40,000 people joined the protest in front of the Bundeshaus, the seat of the Swiss federal government and parliament. The demonstration, which ran under the slogan Nein zum Krieg gegen Irak – Kein Blut für Öl! (No to war in Iraq – no blood for oil!) was the largest in Switzerland since 1945.

In Slovenia, roughly 3,000 people gathered in Ljubljana's central park of Congress Square, supported by the mayor Danica Simšič, and marched the streets in one of the largest demonstrations since independence in 1991.

=== Benelux ===
The Benelux countries had large demonstrations for their total population size. In Belgium organisers had expected around 30,000 people to attend a demonstration in Brussels, which is the home of the European Parliament. They were shocked by a turn out of approximately 100,000 people (WSWS and GLW estimate). The march took over 3 hours to cross the city. The Netherlands saw around 70,000 (USA Today estimate) to 75,000 people (WSWS estimate) protest in Amsterdam. This was the country's largest demonstration since the anti-nuclear campaigns of the 1980s. Anti war website antiwar.com reports that 8,000-14,000 people were present at protests in Luxembourg, however they do not provide a citation for this figure.

=== Bosnia and Herzegovina ===
Bosnia and Herzegovina saw around 100 protesters gather in Mostar. This protest spanned the sectarian divide with both Bosniaks and Croats attending.

=== Croatia ===
There were also protests in Croatia where 10,000 people (WSWS estimate) took part in a protest in the capital city of Zagreb. Croatia also saw protests in Osijek, Vukovar, Knin, Zadar, Šibenik, Split and Dubrovnik.

=== Cyprus ===
Cyprus saw a demonstration of between 500 (USA Today estimate) and more than 800 people (SW estimate) at the British army base in Dhekelia. Enduring heavy rain protesters briefly blocked the base. They then marched to Pyla village where they watched other demonstrations occurring across the world on a giant screen. The demonstration was mostly attended by Greek Cypriots but they were joined by some Turkish Cypriots.

=== Czech Republic ===
In the Czech Republic, over 1,000 people joined a rally at Jan Palach Square in Prague. Czech philosopher Erazim Kohak addressed the crowd, saying, "War is not a solution, war is a problem." Protesters listened to music and speeches before marching to the Czech government building, where they submitted petitions, then march continued to the US embassy.

=== France ===
In France, there were demonstrations in somewhere between twenty (Observer estimate) and eighty cities (WSWS estimate); the organisers estimated that over half a million marched in total. The biggest demonstration took place in Paris, where around 100,000 (USA Today estimate) to 200,000 (WSWS estimate) people marched through the streets, ending in a rally at the Place de la Bastille. This location's role in the French Revolution was considered to give it a historical significance. There was also a demonstration in Toulouse of around 10,000 people.

=== Germany ===
In Germany, coaches brought people from over 300 German towns to Berlin to join a demonstration of 300,000 (police estimate) to 500,000 (organizers' estimate) people; the largest demonstration that had occurred in Berlin for several decades. Protesters, including members of Gerhard Schröder's government, filled the boulevard between the Brandenburg Gate and the Victory Column. ATTAC Germany's spokesperson Malte Kreutzfeld was reported as praising the broadness of the demonstration, saying "The churches and trade unions have linked to make the coalition far broader than even the anti-nuclear missile marches in the 1980s."

=== Greece ===
In Athens, Greece, 150,000 people (WSWS estimate) demonstrated. The protest was generally peaceful, but a small group clashed with police. The police fired tear gas at the group some of whom threw rocks and petrol bombs. Police reported that the trouble was down to a group of anarchists who had split off from the main demonstration.

=== Hungary ===
There was a demonstration in Budapest, Hungary, of 60,000 people (SW estimate).

=== Ireland ===
In Ireland, the Dublin march was only expected to draw 20,000 people, but the actual figure was given variously as 80,000 (police estimate), 90,000 (BBC estimate), 100,000 (Guardian estimate) or 150,000 (Socialist Worker (SW) estimate). The march went from Parnell Square, passing the Department of Foreign Affairs at St. Stephen's Green, and on to the Dame Street for a rally where popular Irish folk singer Christy Moore, Kíla and Labour Party politician Michael D. Higgins were among many speakers from the platform. The march disrupted traffic for more than four hours. Protesters demanded that the Irish government stop allowing the United States military to use Ireland's Shannon Airport as a transatlantic stop-off point in bringing soldiers to the Middle East.

=== Italy ===
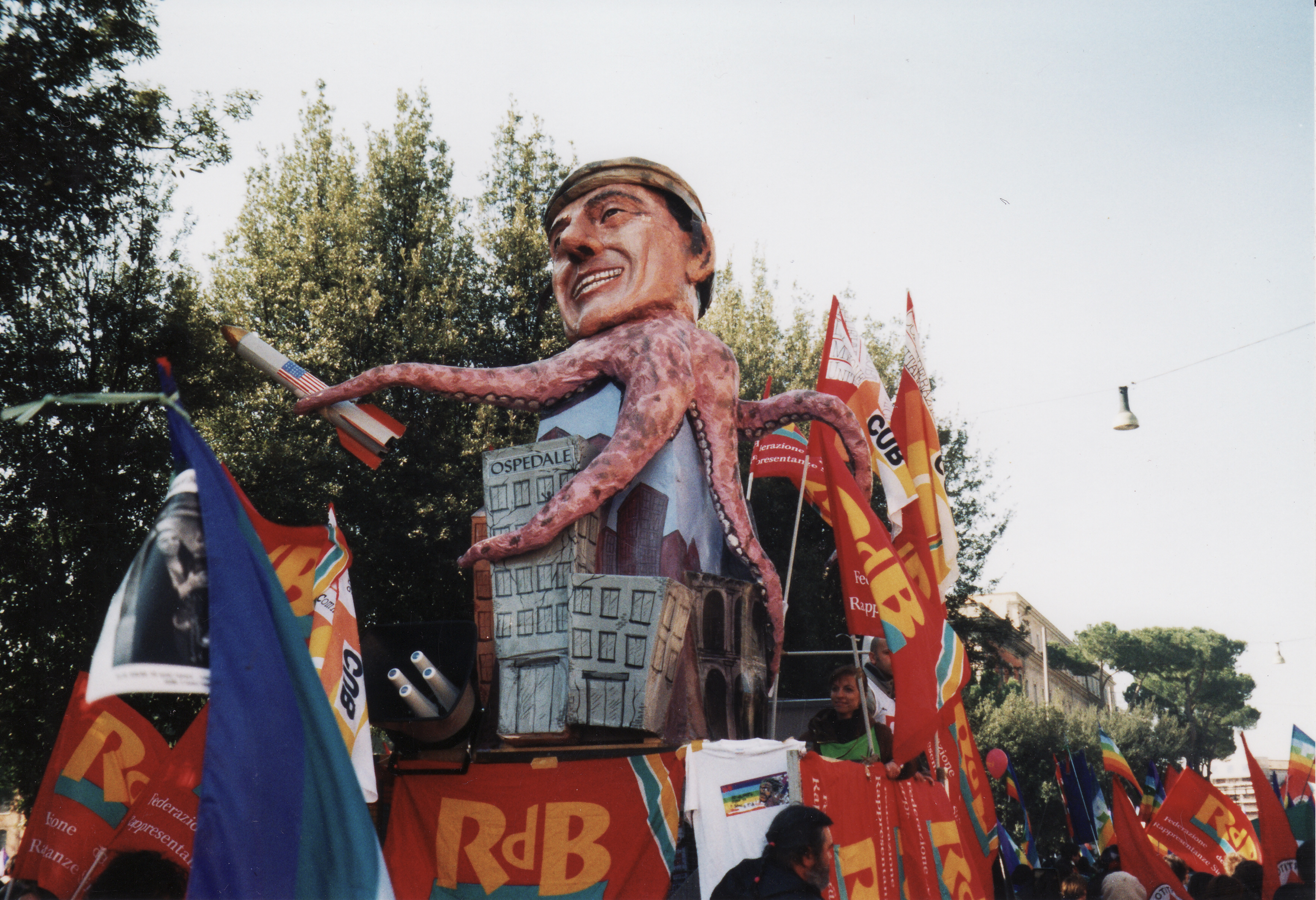
A puppet representing Italian PM Silvio Berlusconi during the demonstration in Rome

The biggest demonstration of the global day of protest took place in Italy in Rome. Nearly 3,000 buses and thirty trains were specially chartered to bring people to the demonstration, which was organised under the slogan "Stop the war; no ifs or buts". The organisers were shocked at the size of the turn out and the unexpected number of people forced the demonstration to set off two hours early. 650,000 people (police estimate) took place in a final rally at which there were many international speakers including Kurds, Iraqi dissidents, Palestinians, a representative of the American Council of Christian Churches and an Israeli conscientious objector who addressed the crowd from a stage hung with Pablo Picasso's Guernica. The size of the demonstration meant that the majority of demonstrators did not make it into the final rally and in total three million people (organisers' estimate, supported by the Guinness Book of World Records) were on the streets. This was listed in the 2004 Guinness Book of World Records as the largest anti-war rally in history. According to the Green Left Weekly (GLW), the demonstration contained people from across Italian society; "Catholic nuns and priests marched alongside young people with dreadlocks, nose rings and Palestinian scarves. Christians, anarchists and communists mingled".

=== Malta ===
Approximately 1,000 demonstrated (SW estimate) in Malta. The weather was cold and rainy. After the demonstration an anti-war concert was held in the capital, Valletta.

=== Nordic countries ===
Norway saw its biggest series of protests since 1917. The biggest took place in its capital Oslo were more than 60,000 protesters (Police estimate and Socialist Worker estimate) joining a demonstration. Protests of around 15,000 took place in Bergen and Trondheim, and 10,000 in Stavanger. Small protests also took place in at least 30 towns across the country. At the rally in Oslo the vice-chair of the Norwegian Confederation of Trade Unions (LO) spoke from the platform claiming that "Bush only cares about American oil interests".

In Denmark 20,000 to 30,000 protesters (WSWS estimate) took part in a march in the capital city, Copenhagen.

In Sweden, 35,000 demonstrated in Stockholm. and about 25,000 in Gothenburg. In Helsinki, Finland, an estimated 15,000 people participated in one of the largest mass-protests in the republic's history.

=== Poland ===
There was a demonstration in Warsaw, Poland of 10,000 people (SW estimate). The demonstration through central Warsaw passed the US embassy. Another protest, organized by the local Wrocław Anti-War Coalition (WKA), was held in the city of Wrocław in the market square by the town hall, with 400–500 people participating.

=== Portugal ===
In Lisbon, police estimated that around 35,000 people gathered to march through the city. Three former Portuguese prime ministers were in attendance.

=== Russia ===
In Russia, which had several demonstrations, the largest occurred in Moscow, with 200,000 people (WSWS estimate) in attendance.

=== Serbia ===
Small demonstrations also took place in Serbia, where there was a demonstration of 200 people (WSWS estimate) in the capital city of Belgrade.

=== Slovakia ===
It was estimated that 1,000 people marched in the capital of Slovakia, Bratislava. The atmosphere of the protest was described as "strongly anti-American and anti-government."

=== Spain ===
Spain saw demonstrations in around 55 cities and towns across the country; the largest was probably in the capital city Madrid, where between 660,000 (Government source's estimate) and 2,000,000 (GLW estimate) took part in what was probably the biggest demonstration since the death of the fascist dictator Francisco Franco in 1975. Barcelona also had a large, with estimates of 350,000 (Delegación de Gobierno), 1,300,000 (Barcelona city hall and Police) or 1,500,000 (GLW) people joining a demonstration which moved from the Passeig de Gràcia to the Plaça de Tetuan. Spain also had demonstrations of approximately 500,000 in Valencia (GLW estimate), 250,000 in Seville (GLW estimate) (200,000 Government sources estimate), 100,000 in Las Palmas de Gran Canaria (GLW estimate) and 100,000 in Cadiz' (GLW estimate) as well as over fifty other towns and cities across the country (WSWS estimate). The city of Oviedo had a population of 180,000 and a turnout of 100,000.

=== Turkey ===
The main demonstration in Turkey took place in Istanbul, thousands (SW estimate) demonstrated. The local authorities had banned the protest claiming to have worries about national security, however the protest organisers went ahead with the rally under the cover of calling a press conference. There were also demonstrations in Adana, Ankara, İzmir, Zonguldak, İzmit, Antalya and Muğla.

=== Ukraine ===
There was also a demonstration in Ukraine of around 2,000 people (USA Today estimate) joined a "Rock against the war" rally in Kyiv's central square.

=== United Kingdom ===
==== London ====
===== Organisation =====
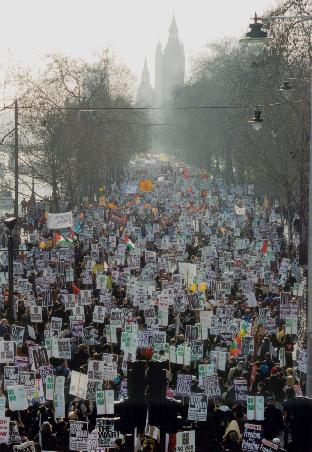
Anti-war protest in London

The Stop the War Coalition (STWC), which had previously arranged a series of demonstrations and rallies against the Afghanistan war and the upcoming Iraq war, jointly called the London demonstration with the Campaign for Nuclear Disarmament (CND) and the Muslim Association of Britain joined the Stop the War Coalition for this event.

In the lead-up to 15 February, the Stop the War Coalition was organising the march from a small office donated by the National Association of Teachers in Further and Higher Education. As the event approached, estimates of the possible number attending rose and in the belief that it would be considerably bigger than the previous demonstrations they had organised Stop agreed with the police for the march to start from two separate locations; Thames Embankment for Londoners and those travelling in from the south, and Gower Street for those travelling in from the midlands and the north. They planned for the two marches to merge at Piccadilly Circus and then proceed to a rally at Hyde Park.

The negotiations for this plan faltered when the Labour government's Secretary of State for Culture, Media and Sport Tessa Jowell initially instructed the Royal Parks agency to deny permission for the rally in Hyde Park for safety reasons and to protect the grass. Trafalgar Square was suggested by Jowell as the alternative venue, but the Mayor of London Ken Livingstone insisted it was of insufficient size. The government's decision was reversed by 5 February.

Sections of the media supported this demonstration. The Daily Mirror gave large coverage in the lead up to the march and provided thousands of placards on the day. The demonstration also received sponsorship support from Greenpeace and Mecca-Cola.

As the date for the march approached the BBC was predicting that around 500,000 people would attend, while StWC was hoping for numbers to top the symbolically significant million mark.

===== Demonstration =====
The British Stop the War Coalition (Stop) claimed the protest in London was the largest political demonstration in the city's history. Police estimated attendance as well in excess of 750,000 people and the BBC estimated that around a million attended.

The weather, on the day of the protest was grey and cold, but reports noted that people remained "in high spirits" as London became gridlocked and protesters were stuck for hours at Gower Street and the Embankment, the two starting points for the march. The police began the march earlier than intended on safety grounds because of the number of people who had arrived in central London. Hundreds of coaches brought protesters from 250 towns and cities across the UK, with around 100 coaches coming from Wales alone. Many commentators noted the diversity of those attending the march. Euan Ferguson noted in The Observer that:

[As well as the] usual suspects – CND, Socialist Workers Party, the anarchists ... There were nuns. Toddlers. Women barristers. The Eton George Orwell Society. Archaeologists Against War. Walthamstow Catholic Church, the Swaffham Women's Choir and Notts County Supporters Say Make Love Not War (And a Home Win against Bristol would be Nice). They won 2-0, by the way. One group of SWP stalwarts were joined, for the first march in any of their histories, by their mothers. There were country folk and lecturers, dentists and poulterers, a hairdresser from Cardiff and a poet from Cheltenham.

All police leave in the capital was cancelled for the event, though Scotland Yard later said that it passed off almost without incident.

Protesters who managed to reach Hyde Park in time heard various speakers, including Harold Pinter, George Galloway, Tony Benn and Bianca Jagger however many were not able to reach the rally as those travelling home by coach had to leave before completing the march route. Protesters at the back end of the march did not reach Hyde Park until hours after the speakers and performers had finished.

Charles Kennedy, then the leader of the Liberal Democrats, was a late addition to the list of speakers. There was some media speculation that he only decided to speak after a lead article in The Guardian was critical of his absence from the planned speaker list. There had been some controversy within the StWC over allowing Kennedy to speak since his party was committed to opposing the war only in the absence of a second UN resolution, but the coalition decided that failing to invite him "would have been divisive for the movement and would have fragmented anti-war opposition to the war."

Because of the size of the march, accurate estimates of the number of people in attendance are difficult. It is relatively uncontentious that the march was the largest ever political demonstration in the UK and the biggest taking to the streets since the Golden Jubilee weekend in 2002.

In an ICM poll for The Guardian (14 February 2003 – 16 February 2003), 6% of people claimed that someone from their household went on the march or had intended to. The Stop claims that this translates into 1.25 million households and thus supports the estimate of two million people, assuming that more than one person could come from each household.

RadioVague in conjunction with the now defunct CableRadio broadcast speeches, music and interviews from the event to the internet throughout the day using a satellite uplink provided by Psand.net.

A sole person demonstrated in opposition to the march outside the Iraqi section of the Jordanian Embassy on the day – Jacques More a writer from Croydon – with a placard saying that, although a last resort, war is necessary "[w]hen evil dictators rule and murder their own people".

Ten years on writer Ian Sinclair assembled an oral history of the demonstration. Journalist Ellie Mae O'Hagan, a UK Uncut activist, told Sinclair that despite its size "it did absolutely nothing". Other witnesses, such as Milan Rai, are of the opposite opinion: "We achieved a lot, and a hell of a lot more than we realise". Tariq Ali, one of the speakers in February 2003, said at the tenth anniversary: "I didn't quite tell them 'Blair is going to go to war regardless of today' but I knew that". "It was a huge show of anger but that's about it. It left no lasting legacy in my opinion."

"One demonstration never overturned government policy overnight – or very rarely – and on something as strategic and massive as that", commented Seumas Milne in an interview with The Quietus online magazine in October 2012. "So if people imagine one demonstration is going to change everything of course that's wrong, but demos, protests, social organisation, trade union organisation, political organisation – all these things are part of the process by which things are going to shift."

==== Scotland ====
In addition to the demonstrations in England, the United Kingdom also saw protests in Scotland. Anti-war activists planned a demonstration in Glasgow which ended at the Scottish Exhibition and Conference Centre (SECC) where the Labour Party was holding a conference for party members. The Labour Party requested that the SECC refuse permission for a stage and PA system outside the conference hall. In response to this the then Scottish Socialist Party MSP Tommy Sheridan tabled a motion in the Scottish Parliament to allow the event to take place, condemning what he claimed were attempts to "stifle all opposition to warmonger Blair". The Labour Party was unsuccessful in blocking the demonstrators' plans. Tony Blair was due to give a speech at the same time as the protesters would have arrived outside the conference centre, but the speech was rescheduled to an earlier time to avoid this.

On the day around 50,000 people according to the Guardian joined the march, which started at Glasgow Green. By the time the front of the march had travelled the 2 miles (3.2 km) to the SECC, Blair had delivered his speech and had left the area. One protester was quoted as saying "We've chased him out of town."

==== Northern Ireland ====
The Northern Irish march was held in Belfast, where 10,000 (Guardian estimate) to 20,000 (SW estimate) protesters from across the sectarian divide joined the demonstration. The march started at the Arts College at 14:30 and moved through that Royal Avenue towards Belfast City Hall. Prominent politicians from Sinn Féin, the Social Democratic and Labour Party (SDLP) and the centrist Alliance Party joined the protest. Sinn Féin president Gerry Adams spoke from the platform at the end rally saying "If President Bush and Mr Blair want war, it should be war against poverty and for equality." There was also a rally in Newry in County Down attending by hundreds of protesters (BBC estimate).

== Americas ==
=== Canada ===
Canada saw protests in 70 cities and towns (WSWS estimate). The biggest took place in Montreal where more than 100,000 people protested (SW and WSWS each estimated 150,000) despite windchill temperatures below −30 °C (−22 °F). 80,000 people joined a demonstration in Toronto, 40,000 in Vancouver, 18,000 (by police estimates) in Edmonton, 8,000 in Victoria, 4,000 in Halifax and 6,000 in Ottawa. Some of the other major centres where protests were held included Windsor and Calgary

There were protests in 70 cities in total. These demonstrations took place despite very cold weather, average temperatures were below −35 °C (−31 °F). In Chicoutimi, 1,500 protested in windchill temperatures of −40 °C (−40 °F) wind-chill temperature in what was one of the coldest marches on that global day of protest.

=== United States ===
Protests took place all across the United States of America with CBS reporting that 150 U.S. cities had protests. According to the World Socialist Web Site, protests took place in 225 different communities.

The largest protests took place in the nation's largest cities including Chicago, Los Angeles, and New York City, but there were also smaller rallies in towns such as Gainesville, Georgia; Macomb, Illinois; and Juneau, Alaska, among scores of others.

==== New York City ====
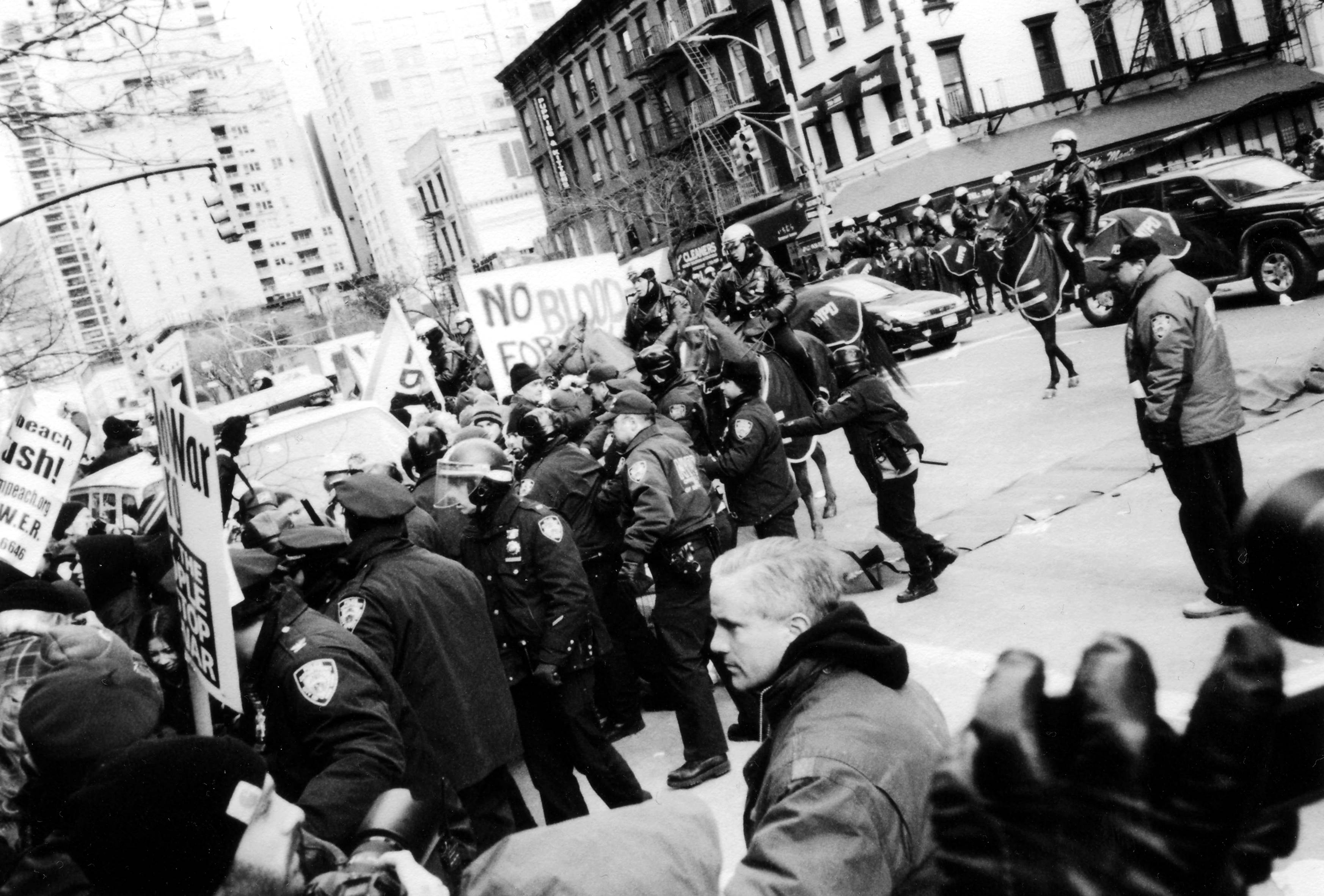
NYPD officers advance on protesters during a brief outbreak of violence.

Organisers of the New York City protest had hoped to march past the headquarters of the United Nations. However, a week before the march, police claimed that they would not be able to ensure order and District Court Judge Barbara Jones ruled against allowing the route. Instead, protesters were only permitted to hold a stationary rally. According to Donna Lieberman, executive director of the New York City Civil Liberties Union, judicial denial of a permit for a protest march was an unprecedented restriction of civil liberties, as marching and parading through streets to express various points-of-view is "a time-honoured tradition in our country that lies at the core of the First Amendment".

On that day, over 300 buses and four special trains brought protesters in from across the country. BBC estimates that 100,000 protesters took part in a rally near the UN headquarters. Among those taking part was the 9/11 Families For Peaceful Tomorrows, a group made up of some relatives of victims of the attacks on the World Trade Center. Speakers included politicians, church leaders and entertainers, such as actress Susan Sarandon and South African Anglican Archbishop Desmond Tutu. As people tried to reach the rally area they ended up constituting an unplanned march, stretching twenty blocks down First Avenue and overflowing onto Second and Third Avenue. In total estimates range from 300,000 to 400,000 protesters (WSWS estimate). The protests were largely peaceful though a small group of protesters who were reported to have broken off from the main rally, caused damage to property in Union Square, and threw stones at police officers, which resulted in forty arrests.

There were numerous complaints that the New York City Police Department (NYPD) were too heavy-handed. Many streets were blocked off and protesters reported feeling hemmed in and scared. By the end of the day, police reported that there had been roughly 275 arrests; organisers dispute this number, claiming that there were 348 arrests. The local Independent Media Center produced a short video claiming to show inappropriate and violent police behavior, including backing horses into demonstrators, shoving people into the metal barricades, spraying a toxic substance at penned-in demonstrators, using abusive language, and raising nightsticks against some who couldn't move. However, NYPD spokesman Michael O'Looney denied the charges claiming that the tape was "filled with special effects" and that it did not prove the police had not been provoked.

A CNN journalist reported that the crowd was diverse, including "older men and women in fur coats, parents with young children, military veterans and veterans of the anti-war movement."

==== Other U.S. cities ====
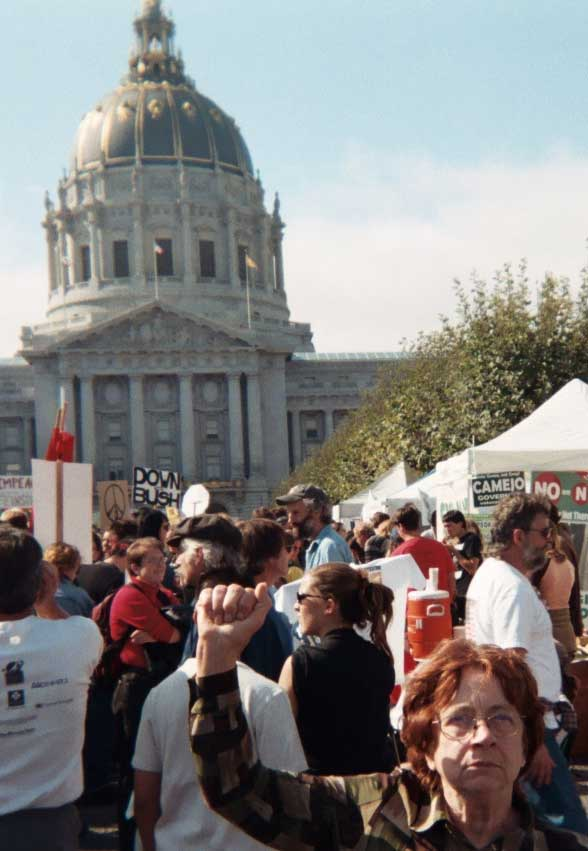
60,000–200,000 protesters of various ages demonstrated in San Francisco (accounts vary as to the total number present).

At a demonstration in Los Angeles, California, 50,000 (WSWS estimate) to 60,000 (GLW estimate) protesters (CNN said "thousands") marched down Hollywood Boulevard filling it for four blocks. Amongst the protesters were the actors Martin Sheen and Mike Farrell and director Rob Reiner. Martin Sheen, who at the time was playing a fictitious U.S. president in The West Wing, said that "None of us can stop this war ... there is only one guy that can do that and he lives in the White House".

Other activists in California originally planned to hold a protest in San Francisco on the Saturday but they changed to the Sunday in order not to conflict with the city's Chinese New Year's parade. The protest was held on Sunday 16 February. The BBC estimated the crowd size to be 150,000 people, while protest organisers and police agreed that the crowd count was 200,000 people. However, a San Francisco Chronicle photographic investigation estimated that the number in attendance at the peak period was closer to 65,000 people, although it did not state how many people were in attendance for the duration of the demonstration.

There was some controversy over Rabbi Michael Lerner not being selected as a speaker for the rally at the end of the demonstration. Lerner claimed that he was not picked to speak for reasons of antisemitism due to his support for the existence of the Israeli state. The organisers responded with a statement that he was not picked because of an arrangement between the groups that organised the demonstration that there would be no speakers that had publicly attacked any other anti-war group and that "since he had publicly attacked A.N.S.W.E.R. in both The New York Times and Tikkun community email newsletters, his inclusion in the program would violate [this] agreement." They also noted that two rabbis with views similar to those of Michael Lerner would be speaking.

In Austin, Texas, 10,000 protestors marched down Congress Avenue from the state capitol building.

In Colorado Springs, 4,000 protesters were dispersed with pepper spray, tear gas, stun guns and batons. 34 were arrested on failure to disperse and other charges and at least two protesters had to have hospital treatment.

In Seattle, organisers aimed to have 20 to 30 thousand people join a march from Seattle Center following a giant blue planet, the emblem adopted by the march organisers. On the day 50,000 people (GLW estimate) turned out to protest under the dual slogan "Stop the war on Iraq; Stop the war on immigrants", more than on the Seattle protests against the WTO Ministerial Conference of 1999.

Demonstrations also took place in Philadelphia, where thousands (CNN estimate) joined a march to the Liberty Bell, and in Chicago, where 10,000 people demonstrated (GLW estimate).

In Florida a small number of protesters staged a naked protest on Palm Beach. They initially had some problems getting permission for the action, but on the Thursday before, a U.S. District court ruled that the planned nude protest was legal at the public beach. Most of the attendees had come from the four-day Mid-Winter Naturist Festival that was taking place at the same time. There was also a demonstration of 900 people (USA Today estimate) on the island of Puerto Rico.

=== Mexico ===
The chief demonstration in Mexico took place in Mexico City where around 10,000 people (USA Today estimate) joined a demonstration which ended with a rally at a heavily guarded US embassy. Among the demonstrators was Nobel Peace Prize laureate Rigoberta Menchú.

=== South America ===
Protests took place across South America including Uruguay, where their protest took place on 14 February. An estimated 70,000 people marched down Montevideo's Avenida 18. In Brazil, a protest led by President Luiz Inácio Lula da Silva was attended by 1,500 marchers (Police estimate).

In Buenos Aires, Argentina, an estimate of 50,000 protesters attended which included some veterans of the Falklands War of 1982.

== Asia ==
Areas in Asia with large Muslim populations, in particular the countries of the West Asia, had the highest levels of opposition to the proposed Iraq war, however demonstrations in many of these countries were relatively small. One United Arab Emirates newspaper Al Bayan led with the statement: "The people of the world and more than one million Europeans demonstrate against an attack on Iraq while the Arab people and their leaders are in a deep coma."

The reasons for this are complex, but one factor that is commonly cited is the suppression of protest movements by the conservative leaders of those countries. A report by Asef Bayat in the Middle East Report suggests that "the Arab governments allow little room for independent dissent" as is shown by the fact that "Since 2000, demands for collective protests against the US and Israel have been ignored by the authorities" and "unofficial street actions have faced intimidation and assault, with activists being harassed or detained".

=== West Asia ===
In Iraq, the country in which the war would take place, protesters marched down Palestine Street in Baghdad where several thousand Iraqis—many carrying Kalashnikov rifles—joined in the global protests. Unlike the vast majority of protests across the world the protest in Baghdad was also in support of the Baathist regime; it was called by Saddam Hussein as "World Anger Day". Protesters carried posters of Saddam and burned US flags.

A large protest also took place on the streets of Damascus in Syria, which borders Iraq. Protesters chanted anti-U.S. and anti-Israeli slogans while marching to the "People's Assembly" in a demonstration of between 10,000 (GLW estimate) to 200,000 protesters (CBS estimate and USA Today estimate).

In Lebanon, 10,000 protesters (CBS, GLW estimate) took part in a demonstration in Beirut. However, the protest ended early when it rained heavily. There were also demonstrations of 5,000 people (GLW estimate) in Amman, Jordan.

In Israel there was a demonstration in Tel Aviv of approximately 2,000 (USA Today estimate) to 3,000 people (GLW and WSWS estimate). The demonstration contained both Arabs and Jews. It was organized by a wide range of organizations including the Communist Party of Israel, the National Democratic Assembly, the Arab Democratic Party, the Independent Media Center, the Alternative Information Center, Ta'ayush, the Gush Shalom movement, and the Organization for Democratic Action. However, it was boycotted by other left-wing groups, including Peace Now and Meretz. The demonstration was coordinated with a similar demonstration which took place in Ramallah.

=== Other areas in Asia ===
Small protests took place across Japan mostly being held outside US military bases. The biggest demonstration of the day took place in Shibuya, where 5,000 (SW estimate) people marched. However, there was a demonstration of 25,000 in Tokyo on Friday, the day before as well as smaller demonstrations in Osaka and other cities. The Tokyo protests contained Japanese veterans of World War II and survivors of the 1945 atomic bombings of Hiroshima and Nagasaki.

Around 3,000 people (SW estimate) joined an illegal demonstration in the Malaysian city of Kuala Lumpur despite police warnings that any participants in a protest would face stern action. The demonstration ended at the US embassy at Jalan Tun Razak. Taiwan had a protest of more than 2,000 people (WSWS estimate) in the capital city of Taipei under the slogan of "No Blood for Oil".

India saw protests across the country including 10,000 (BBC estimate) in Calcutta. In Bangladesh 2,000 people joined a demonstration in Dhaka.

In South Korea, there was a demonstration of 2,000 people (WSWS estimate) which took place in the capital city Seoul. The protest started with a rally at Marronnier Park after which there was a demonstration that ended in Jongmyo were the size of the protest increased in size to 3,000 people (WSWS estimate). Jongmyo was surrounded by riot police who almost out numbered the protesters. Protests also took place in the South Korean cities of Busan, Daegu, Daejeon, Gwangju and Wonju.

In Beijing, China, three protests were held the following day, attended by about 450 people in total, including foreigners and domestic students.

== Africa ==
=== South Africa ===
In Johannesburg, around 8,000-10,000 people joined in a colorful and peaceful protest. They toyi-toyied and marched, stopping at the U.S. Consulate General where riot police formed a protective chain around the entrance.

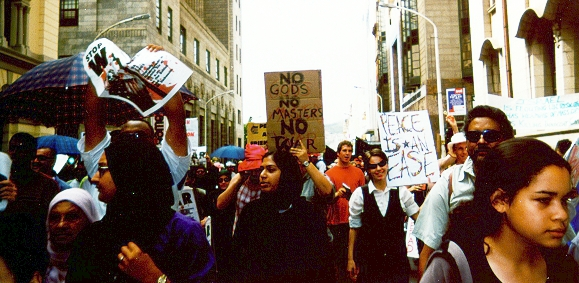
Protesters in Cape Town

In Cape Town 5,000 (USA Today estimate) to 20,000 protesters (WSWS estimate) joined a demonstration march which started at 10 in the morning on Keizersgracht road and ended at the offices of the US consulate-general which was guarded by a ring of riot police, where there was a rally with speakers. Protests were organised by the Anti-War Coalition and the Stop the War campaign of the Congress of South African Trade Unions (Cosatu).

Protests of thousands of people also took place at Durban and Bloemfontein.

A number of prominent ANC politicians attended marches. At the Cape Town rally the South African Minister, Pallo Jordan addressed the protesters saying; "We will stop the war. The voice of the people will be heard."

=== Tunisia ===
A protest of around 3,000 (SW estimate) in the Tunisian city of Sfax was attacked by police who beat the protesters with batons and truncheons, injuring at least 20.

== Oceania ==
=== Fiji ===
Protests in Fiji took place on the day before, on Friday morning, heralding the weekend of demonstrations. Protesters handed floral Valentine's Day messages to the representatives of the US, British and Australian governments urging them to avoid the war.

=== Australia ===
Friday also saw protests in Melbourne, where around 150,000 people (BBC estimate) joined a demonstration.

On the Saturday protests also took place in Australia's national capital (Canberra), with 20,000 protesters. The Sydney demonstration on Sunday 16 February included a feeder march of 10,000 trade unionists, with 200,000 (BBC estimate) to 250,000 (Sydney Morning Herald estimate) demonstrating in Sydney. Across the six state capitals an estimated 600,000 demonstrated in cities around the country.

Beyond the capitals, many major cities and towns around Australia had protests.

Queensland
Bundaberg (150), Mackay (1,000), Noosa (?), Rockhampton (600), Toowoomba (800), Townsville (1,000 to 2,000)
New South Wales
Armidale (5,000), Bathurst (peace bus to Canberra; 12 Feb) 32, Bellingen (3,000), Bega (400), Byron Bay (3,000), Forster, New South Wales/Tuncurry (700), Kempsey (300), Kingscliff (1,000), Lismore (7,000), Newcastle (20,000), Tamworth (500), Taree (unknown), Tathra (1,500), Wollongong (February 8; 5,000), Wagga Wagga (1,000)
Tasmania
Launceston (1,000), Strahan (50), Devonport (750)
Victoria
Geelong (200), Albury, Mildura
South Australia
Mount Gambier (500), Whyalla (Peace vigil)
Western Australia
Margaret River (Peace pilgrimage; 20)
Northern Territory
Alice Springs (400)

At protests in Australia in Bellingen, New South Wales around 2,500 people (SW estimate) joined a rally at the towns sports ground. As well as hearing from speakers, the demonstrators were entertained by a group of a cappella singers called 'The Bushbombs'. The rally was about as large as the town's population.

=== New Zealand ===
The first actual demonstration of the day took place in New Zealand where 10,000 people demonstrated in Auckland and Wellington. The Auckland march was bigger than expected, forcing police to shut off Queen Street. People were reported to be still starting the march as those at the front of the march reached a rally in Myers Park several kilometres away. In Wellington the march had to carry on after the then planned end point as there were too many people to fit into the park. Around 400 to 500 people marched in Hamilton. There were also protests in at least 18 other centres, including Dunedin, Thames, Opotiki, Whakatane, Whangarei, Timaru and Rotorua, and Picnic for Peace in Christchurch.

== Antarctica ==
A group of scientists at the US McMurdo Station held a rally on the ice at the edge of the Ross Sea.

== Effect ==
At the time, many commentators were hopeful that this global mobilization of unprecedented scale would stop the coming Iraq war. The New York Times writer Patrick Tyler claimed that they showed that there were "two superpowers on the planet – the United States, and worldwide public opinion".

The unprecedented size of the demonstrations was widely taken to indicate that the majority of people across the world opposed the war. However, the potential effect of the protests was generally dismissed by pro-war politicians. The Prime Minister of Australia, John Howard, claimed that the protests were not representative of public opinion, saying "I don't know that you can measure public opinion just by the number of people that turn up at demonstrations." In the United States, the then National Security Advisor Condoleezza Rice was reported as saying that the protests would "not affect [the administration's] determination to confront Saddam Hussein and help the Iraqi people".

Her view was borne out as the day of protests, along with the protests that followed it, failed to stop the war. However, the protests and other public opposition were seen as a key factor in the decisions of the governments of many countries, such as Canada, to not send troops to Iraq, and of Turkey to deny coalition use of airbases in its territory. The protests have also been cited as a factor strengthening the hand of the "uncommitted six" members of the United Nations Security Council - Angola, Cameroon, Chile, Mexico, and Pakistan.

Though demonstrations against the Iraq war and subsequent occupation continued, none of the demonstrations through to 2011 matched the 15 February protest in terms of size. One suggested explanation for this is that people became disillusioned with marching as a political tactic because of the failure of these demonstrations to achieve their explicit aim. In 2006, three years after the protest day, in an article arguing for people to attend a further march, Mike Marqusee put forward two counter arguments to this. Firstly, he claimed that it was too soon to judge the long-term significance of the demonstrations. As examples, he stated, "People who took part in the non-cooperation campaigns in India in the 20s and 30s had to wait a long time for independence," and "There were eight years of protest and more than 2 million dead before the Vietnam war came to an end". Secondly, he claimed that while the effect of marching may be uncertain, the effect of not marching would make it more likely that the occupation would continue.

Despite failing in its explicit aim, the 15 February global day of anti-war protests had many effects that, according to some, were not directly intended. According to United Kingdom left-wing anti-war activist Salma Yaqoob, one of these was that they were a powerful antidote to the idea that the war was a "Clash of Civilizations", or a religious war, an idea she claimed was propagated both by Western leaders and reactionary forces in the Arab world. This is echoed in the words of former Hizb ut-Tahrir organiser Hadiya Masieh who said of the non-Muslims marching in London "How could we demonise people who obviously opposed aggression against Muslims?".

== See also ==
- We Are Many, a 2014 documentary film about 15 February 2003 protest
- Protests against the Iraq War
- September 2019 climate strikes - largest worldwide climate strike in history
- The 2005 novel Saturday is set in London on this day, against the backdrop of the protest
- Boom! – a 2003 single by metal band System of a Down, in which the music video documented a majority of the protests.
