= International Campaign Against Aggression on Iraq =

Anti-war campaign

The International Campaign Against Aggression on Iraq (ICAAI) was a campaign umbrella group launched in Cairo 2003, at the Cairo Anti-war Conference, to oppose the invasion of Iraq.

The ICAAI sought to co-ordinate the February 15th global day of action against the Iraq war, which became the largest day of demonstrations in history, involving up to 25 million people in 150 countries.

The ICAAI's president was Ahmed Ben Bella and its vice-president was John Rees.

== See also ==
- List of anti-war organizations
