= Lonny (given name) =

- Pronunciation: /ˈlɒni/ LON-ee
- Gender: Male

Lonny is a masculine given name.

== People ==
- Lonny Baxter (born 1979), American former basketball player
- Lonny Bereal (fl. 2006–present), American R&B singer, songwriter and producer
- Lonny Bohonos (born 1973), Canadian former National Hockey League player
- Lonny Calicchio (born 1972), American football player
- Lonny Chapman (1920–2007), American actor
- Lonny Chin (born 1960), English model and Playboy Playmate of the Month
- Lonny Frey (1910–2009), American Major League Baseball player
- Lonny Kellner (1930–2003), German singer and actress
- Lonny Price (born 1959), American director, actor and writer
- Lonny Ross (born 1978), American actor and writer
- Lonny R. Suko (born 1943), American district judge

== See also ==
- Lonnie
- Loni (given name)
