= Lonie =

Lonie is a given name and a surname. Notable people with the name include:

- Bridie Lonie (born 1951/2), New Zealand academic, arts educator, arts writer and artist
- Jean Lonie (1930–1997), New Zealand poet and teacher
- Judith Lonie (1935–1982), Australian poet
- Iain Lonie (1932-1988), New Zealand poet
- Murray Lonie, headed the 1980 Lonie Report, report into transportation in Victoria, Australia
- Nathan Lonie (born 1983), Australian Football League footballer
- Ryan Lonie (born 1983), Nathan Lonie's twin brother and also an AFL footballer
- Lonie Paxton (born 1978), a National Football League long snapper

== See also ==
- Loni (disambiguation)
- Loney (name)
