= Kaossara Sani =

Togolese women human rights defender

- Born: Burkina Faso
- Occupations: climate and peace activist
- Website: https://kaossarasani.com/

Kaossara Sani is a Togolese environmentalist, writer and sociologist who lives in Lomé, Togo. She is the founder of Africa Optimism and co-founder as well as the executive director of the Act on Sahel Movement.

== Early life ==
Kaossara Sani was born in Burkina Faso before moving to Togo at the age of nine years old. She grew up in Lomé. She lives with her mother and two brothers.

== Activism ==
She found Africa Optimism which is a movement that works on publicizing the solution of climate and environmental problem with education. She is also a co-founder of Act On Sahel Movement which raises money to pay for seeds and fertilizer for farmers in the Sahel region of Africa. The organization also raises money to buy sanitary products and provide access to clean water and renewable energy.

Her activism was further recognized when she sent a manifesto to the 2021 United Nations Climate Change Conference stating that the cost for traveling to Glasgow would be better used to build a borehole to provide clean water to the people of Togo. In her manifesto, she also reminds the wealthy nations of their "broken promise" to provide $100 billion annually in climate finance for developing countries till the end of 2020 which was continued to 2025 on 2015. She also urged the wealthy nations to deliver climate finance to the 46 least developed countries and to invest in weather and climate change research through building weather stations.
