= Loney =

Loney may refer to:

- Loney (name)
- The Loney, 2014 novel by Andrew Michael Hurley

== See also ==
- Looney (disambiguation)
