= Glasgow Statement =

International agreement on climate change (2021)

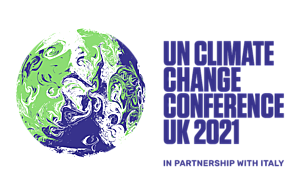
Logo of the 2021 United Nations Climate Change Conference in Glasgow, where the Glasgow Statement was signed

The Glasgow Statement (sometimes called the Clean Energy Transition Partnership) is an international agreement reached at the 2021 United Nations Climate Change Conference held in Glasgow, United Kingdom. Signed by 39 governments and institutions, it commits signatories to shift government-backed international finance away from fossil fuels and instead to prioritise renewable energy.

== Background ==
Proponents of the agreement argue that governments must shift public finance away from fossil fuels because "governments control them directly, and they can influence much larger private financial flows," and that "shifting public support from fossil fuels to clean energy is one way to bridge the gap in financing for clean energy."

The UK Government launched the Glasgow Statement at COP26 following implementation of its own policy to end international public finance for fossil fuels. The Glasgow Statement is the first international political commitment to address public finance for oil and gas, and has been called "arguably one of the most concrete achievements of the COP26 summit."

The signatories include some of the largest historic providers of international fossil fuel public finance, including Canada, Germany, Italy, the United States, the United Kingdom, and France.

In 2022, the International Institute for Sustainable Development estimated that if the Glasgow Statement signatories all met their commitments, then collectively the Glasgow Statement would shift almost $28 billion per year from fossil fuels to renewable energy.

The American writer Rebecca Solnit listed the Glasgow Statement as a victory for campaigners in her 2023 book, Not Too Late, in a chapter called "An Incomplete List of Climate Victories."
