= Loney (name) =

Loney is a given name and a surname. Notable people with the name include:

== Given name ==
- Loney Gordon, (1915–1999), American chemist and laboratory researcher
- Loney Haskell, (1870–1933), American vaudeville entertainer and theatre manager

== Surname ==
- Allan Loney, Canadian ice hockey player
- Cleve Loney, American politician
- Ernest Loney, British middle- and long-distance runner
- Jack Loney, Australian writer and amateur maritime historian.
- James Loney (peace activist), a Canadian activist who was once held hostage in Iraq
- James Loney (baseball), American baseball player
- John Loney, Canadian politician
- June Loney, Australian harpist
- Nicholas Loney, English businessman and the British Empire's vice-consul in the city of Iloílo.
- Michael Loney, Australian actor
- Milton R. Loney, American politician
- Peter Loney, Victoria, Australia politician
- S L Loney, British mathematician
- Troy Loney, Canadian ice hockey player
- William Loney, British naval officer
- Willie Loney, Scottish footballer

== See also ==
- Loni (disambiguation)
- Lonie
- Looney (surname)
