= Loni, Bijapur =

Loni (B.K.)
- village
- Location in Karnataka, India Loni (B.K.) (India)
- Coordinates: 17.17°N 75.96°E
- Country: India
- State: Karnataka
- District: Bijapur
- Talukas: Indi

Population (2001)
  - Total: 5,139

Languages
  - Official: Kannada
- Time zone: UTC+5:30 (IST)

Loni (B.K.) is a village in the southern state of Karnataka, India. It is located in the Chadchan taluk of Bijapur district in Karnataka. The Syed Bafaqui (Bafaqeeh) family are the guardians of the village from the past 300 years, Even today the present generation of the family is based in nearby Bijapur city and every year they organize a fair in memory of their ancestor who was deemed the first protector of the village. Many miracles have been attributed to this family of Bafaqui Syed's.

== Demographics ==
As of 2001 India census, Loni (B.K.) had a population of 5139 with 2680 males and 2459 females.

== See also ==
- Bijapur district
- Districts of Karnataka
