= Lonnie Ortega =

American aviation artist

- Born: October 3, 1946 (age 79)
- Education: Cerritos Junior College in Cerritos, California
- Known for: Aviation art

Lonnie Ortega (born October 3, 1946, in California) is an American artist specializing in aviation art.

== Background ==
Lonnie Ortega was born in Southern California and is one of six children. He graduated from Western High School in Anaheim, California in 1964 and continued on to Cerritos Junior College in Cerritos, California to study art.

In 1966, Lonnie enrolled at Cypress Junior College in Cypress, California to play baseball. During his time at Cypress Junior College, he was drafted by the St. Louis Cardinals. In 1967, he was offered a full athletic scholarship to play baseball at Chapman College in Orange, California. However, in the summer of 1968, Lonnie's baseball playing days ended with a serious knee injury.

== Career ==
The injury turned out to be a blessing in disguise - with his baseball dreams shattered, Lonnie chose to concentrate on his art.

Lonnie was hired in 1969 to work for the McDonnell Douglas Aircraft Company in Long Beach, California (now known as The Boeing Company after a merger between the two companies in 1997). He completed his art education while working for the company and was the understudy of famed aviation artist Robert Grant (R.G.) Smith, who worked for the company as a design engineer. When Smith died due to complications related to Parkinson's disease, Lonnie was asked by Smith's daughter to do a portrait of her father - he was honored to do so for his famous mentor.

Lonnie retired from The Boeing Company in May 2002 to pursue his art career full-time. He is a member of the Commemorative Air Force and is part of Air Group One, which is stationed out of El Cajon, California. Each year, Lonnie contributes his time and money to the ongoing projects within the group by selling his artwork at the Gillespie Field Air Show and donating a percentage of the proceeds to Air Group One.

He and his artwork can also be found at various other air shows in the Southern California area and throughout the United States (i.e. the Oshkosh Airshow and Reno Air Races).

== Personal ==
Lonnie lives in Long Beach, California with his wife Julie and their two children, Megan and John.
