= Loni (given name) =

Loni is a generally feminine name related to the given names Leonie, Lonna (or Lona) and Lonnie.

It may refer to:

== People ==
=== Women ===
- Loni Ackerman (born 1949), American Broadway musical theatre performer and cabaret singer
- Loni Anderson (born 1945), American actress
- Loni Hancock (born 1940), California state senator
- Loni Harwood (born c. 1989), American poker player
- Loni Heuser (1908–1999), German film actress
- Loni Love (born 1971), American actress and comedian
- Eleanore Loni Nest (1915–1990), German actress
- Loni Rose (born 1976/77), American singer-songwriter
- Loni Sanders (born 1958), retired porn star and adult model

=== Men ===
- Loni Logori (1871–1929), Albanian-Egyptian entrepreneur and poet

== Fictional characters ==
- Lóni, a Dwarf in J. R. R. Tolkien's Middle-earth fictional universe
- Loni Garvey, in the Mobile Suit Gundam Unicorn novel series
