= Michael O'Looney =

Michael O'Looney is an American communications executive and advisor. He is a Partner at Brunswick Group, where he advises corporations, financial institutions and investors on crisis situations, shareholder activism, mergers and acquisitions, and other high-stakes communications matters. He has previously held senior communications roles at Elliott Management, Barclays PLC and Merrill Lynch, and served as Deputy Commissioner for Public Information for the New York City Police Department following the September 11 attacks. Earlier in his career, he was a television journalist with CBS News and WCBS-TV in New York.

Michael O'Looney
Born	Michael O'Looney
Occupations	Communications executive, communications advisor, Deputy Commissioner for Public Information for the NY City Police Department
Employer	Brunswick Group
Known For	Hostage Negotiations , Journalism
Children	2

== Career ==
=== Brunswick Group ===
O’Looney is a Partner in the Financial Situations Group at Brunswick Group, a global advisory firm. His work focuses on crisis management, shareholder activism, M&A, litigation and corporate reputation.

=== Elliott Management ===
O’Looney served as Head of Communications at Elliott Management, where he oversaw communications related to the firm’s investment activities and public profile.

=== Barclays ===
O’Looney was Managing Director and Head of Corporate Communications for Barclays in the Americas. He joined Barclays following its acquisition of Lehman Brothers’ North American operations and was responsible for corporate communications during a period of integration, litigation and leadership change.

=== Merrill Lynch ===
O’Looney served as Managing Director and Head of Corporate Communications at Merrill Lynch. He held this role during the global financial crisis, working with senior leadership through market disruption, executive transitions and the firm’s sale to Bank of America.

=== Public Service ===
From 2002 to 2004, O’Looney served as Deputy Commissioner for Public Information for the New York City Police Department. Appointed by Police Commissioner Raymond Kelly in the months following the September 11 terrorist attacks, he was the department’s chief spokesperson and a senior advisor on public communications.

During his tenure, he was involved in communications around major incidents including terrorism threats, high-profile crimes and citywide emergencies. He also helped negotiate the peaceful resolution of an armed hostage situation involving a detective inside a Manhattan precinct station house.

In a separate incident, O’Looney assisted in the apprehension of an armed suspect wanted in connection with a series of assaults, helping to detain the individual on a subway platform alongside a police officer. In 2003, he was inducted into the NYPD Honor Legion.

=== Journalism ===
O’Looney began his career in broadcast journalism and held several reporting roles before joining WCBS-TV in New York. He served as a reporter and anchor at WCBS-TV and as a contributing correspondent for the CBS Evening News.

He reported on major domestic and international events, including coverage of the September 11 attacks in New York.

In October 2001, he was the first reporter to gain entry to the Hamburg apartment used by Mohamed Atta in planning the September 11 attacks. He also conducted an interview with Palestinian leader Yasser Arafat following Arafat’s speech renouncing suicide bombings, in Ramallah in the West Bank.

=== Other Work ===
O’Looney appeared as a reporter in both the HBO series The Sopranos, and 1996 movie City Hall starring Al Pacino.
