= Luni (Punjab) =

- Location within Pakistan
- Coordinates: 29.633°N 67.922°E
- Country: Pakistan
- Province: Punjab
- Elevation: 278 m (912 ft)
- Time zone: UTC+5 (PST)

Luni, also spelt Loni, is a village in the Punjab province of Pakistan. It is located at 32°48'0N 74°40'0E with an altitude of 278 metres (915 feet).
