= Just Energy Transition Partnership =

Financing transition away from coal

A Just Energy Transition Partnership (JETP) is a "failed" financing cooperation mechanism to help a heavily coal-dependent emerging economy make a just energy transition away from coal.

== Countries ==
=== Indonesia ===
The Indonesia Just Energy Transition Partnership is a 20 billion dollar agreement to decarbonise Indonesia's coal-powered economy, launched on 15 November 2022 at the G20 summit. This Just Energy Transition Partnership comes after the first such agreement, the South Africa JET-IP, which was announced in 2021 as a partnership with Germany, France, the UK and US. The agreement with Indonesia involves all G7 countries as funding contributors, including Canada, Italy and Japan. It also includes non G7 members Denmark and Norway. The JETP aims to develop a comprehensive investment plan (the JETP Investment and Policy Plan) to achieve Indonesia's decarbonisation goals.

Under the JETP, the aim is for Indonesia to reach net-zero emissions of greenhouse gases from electricity production by 2050, bringing forward its target by a decade, and reach a peak in those emissions by 2030. According to two think tanks, the USD 20 bn allocated under the programme are insufficient for these goals.

On the sidelines of the November 2022 G20 summit, the Asian Development Bank signed an agreement with Cirebon Electric Power to open discussions on accelerated retirement of the Cirebon Steam Power Plant. However as of early 2026 the progress of the Indonesia JETP has been slow and remains in doubt.

=== Senegal ===
This was announced in 2023.

=== South Africa ===
The South Africa Just Energy Transition Investment Plan (JET-IP) is a $8.5bn deal to help South Africa (ZA) decarbonise its economy, struck at COP26 in 2021. This Just Energy Transition Partnership is a cooperation between the governments of ZA, France, Germany, the United Kingdom, the United States and the European Union. It aims to help South Africa achieve the goals set out in its nationally determined contribution to the Paris Agreement, and prevent emissions of 1 to 1.5 gigatonnes of greenhouse gas emissions. The South African JETP was a model for a subsequent similar agreement on coal power in Indonesia, known as the Indonesia Just Energy Transition Partnership.

Alongside the main JETP, there are two other international agreements to accelerate the retirement of coal power plants in South Africa. The others are:

- The Eskom Just Energy Transition Project, a $497 million project to support Eskom, South Africa's public utility, to decommission the Komati Power Station. It was funded by the World Bank.
- The Climate Investment Funds Accelerating Coal Transition Investment Plan, which blends billions of dollars from the World Bank, International Finance Corporation and African Development Bank to finance coal power plant decommissioning and repurposing in Mpumalanga, the province where most of South Africa's coal capacity is located, along with replacement of its power capacity.

=== Vietnam ===
This was announced in 2022.
