= Komati =

Komati may refer to:

- Komati caste, an Indian trading community primarily found in central and south India
- Komati Power Station, a coal-fired power plant in South Africa

== Geography ==
- Komati River, a River in South Africa, Eswatini and Mozambique
- Komatiite, a type of ultramafic mantle-derived volcanic rock
