= South Africa Just Energy Transition Investment Plan =

South African decarbonisation initiative

The South Africa Just Energy Transition Investment Plan (JET-IP) is a $8.5bn deal to help South Africa (ZA) decarbonise its economy, struck at COP26 in 2021. This Just Energy Transition Partnership is a cooperation between the governments of ZA, France, Germany, the United Kingdom, the United States and the European Union. It aims to help South Africa achieve the goals set out in its nationally determined contribution to the Paris Agreement, and prevent emissions of 1 to 1.5 gigatonnes of greenhouse gas emissions. The South African JETP was a model for a subsequent similar agreement on coal power in Indonesia, known as the Indonesia Just Energy Transition Partnership.

Alongside the main JETP, there are two other international agreements to accelerate the retirement of coal power plants in South Africa. The others are:

- The Eskom Just Energy Transition Project, a $497 million project to support Eskom, South Africa's public utility, to decommission the Komati Power Station. It was funded by the World Bank.
- The Climate Investment Funds Accelerating Coal Transition Investment Plan, which blends billions of dollars from the World Bank, International Finance Corporation and African Development Bank to finance coal power plant decommissioning and repurposing in Mpumalanga, the province where most of South Africa's coal capacity is located, along with replacement of its power capacity.
