= Cirebon Steam Power Plant =

Coal-fired power plant in Indonesia

Coordinates: 6.770°S 108.615°E

The Cirebon Steam Power Plant (Indonesian: Pembangkit Listrik Tenaga Uap Cirebon) is a 660 MW coal-fired power plant developed by PT Cirebon Electric Power (CEP) in the Kanci area to the southeast of Cirebon, Indonesia.

== History ==
The first unit of the plant was launched in mid October 2012. The reported cost of the plant was around $US 850 million. Construction began in 2008 and was substantially completed, a little behind time, in mid-2012. Sales from the plant to the Indonesian state-owned electricity company Perusahaan Listrik Negara (PLN) began on 27 July 2012.

Like other IPPs in Indonesia, the plant will sell the electricity produced to the PLN at an agreed feed-in tariff price. The initial agreed rate was reported to be US 4.43 cents per kWh (USD 0.0443/kWh) although, because of high coal prices, it was reported that the PLN would adjust the purchase price upwards to US 5.2 cents per kWh (USD 0.052/kWh).

It is reported that there are tentative plans to extend the Cirebon plant later with the installation of another 1,000 MW costing around $US 1.2 - 1.3 billion.

In 2015, South Korean companies Hyundai Engineering & Construction and Hyundai Engineering won the contract for the Cirebon 2 1,000 MW CFPP (USC) project worth $727 million. The main contents of the project are to build a 1,000 MW coal-fired power plant and a 500 kV transmission line along the coastline of Java, and expand the substation. As the construction supervisor, Hyundai Engineering & Construction was responsible for installing supplementary equipment and boilers, and civil engineering works.

On November 14, 2022, the Asian Development Bank signed a memorandum of understanding to jointly explore the early retirement of the Cirebon Unit 1. This agreement was reached at the 2022 G20 Bali summit alongside the Indonesia Just Energy Transition Partnership.

== Share structure ==
The CEP is one of the various independent power producers (IPPs) in Java. It is a joint venture of four companies: Japan-owned Marubeni Corporation which owns the largest stake (32.5%), Korea Midland Power Co (27.5%), South Korean company Samtan Co Ltd (20%) and the Indonesian listed firm PT Indika Energy (20%).

== Function ==
The first unit of the plant consists of 1 × 660 MW coal-fired power system having one turbine generator, one steam turbine and a balance of plants. Its boiler is sliding pressure operation, and is the first plant to use supercritical boiler technology in Indonesia. The plant will use coal with a sulfur content of less than 0.2% sourced from Kalimantan. Consumption will be 7,240 tonnes per day and around 2.8 million tonnes per year. The plant is expected to produce around 5.5 TWh per year (around 4% of the electricity supply in the region).
