= Indonesia Just Energy Transition Partnership =

The Indonesia Just Energy Transition Partnership is a 20 billion dollar agreement to decarbonise Indonesia's coal-powered economy, launched on 15 November 2022 at the G20 summit. This Just Energy Transition Partnership comes after the first such agreement, the South Africa JET-IP, which was announced in 2021 as a partnership with Germany, France, the UK and US. The agreement with Indonesia involves all G7 countries as funding contributors, including Canada, Italy and Japan. It also includes non G7 members Denmark and Norway. The JETP aims to develop a comprehensive investment plan (the JETP Investment and Policy Plan) to achieve Indonesia's decarbonisation goals.

Under the JETP, the aim is for Indonesia to reach net-zero emissions of greenhouse gases from electricity production by 2050, bringing forward its target by a decade, and reach a peak in those emissions by 2030. According to two think tanks, the USD 20 bn allocated under the programme are insufficient for these goals.

On the sidelines of the November 2022 G20 summit, the Asian Development Bank signed an agreement with Cirebon Electric Power to open discussions on accelerated retirement of the Cirebon Steam Power Plant. However as of early 2026 the progress of the Indonesia JETP has been slow and remains in doubt.
