= 2022 G20 Bali summit =

Summit of the leaders of all G20 member nations in Nusa Dua, Bali, Indonesia

2022 G20 Bali summit 17th G20 Summit
- 15–16 November 2022

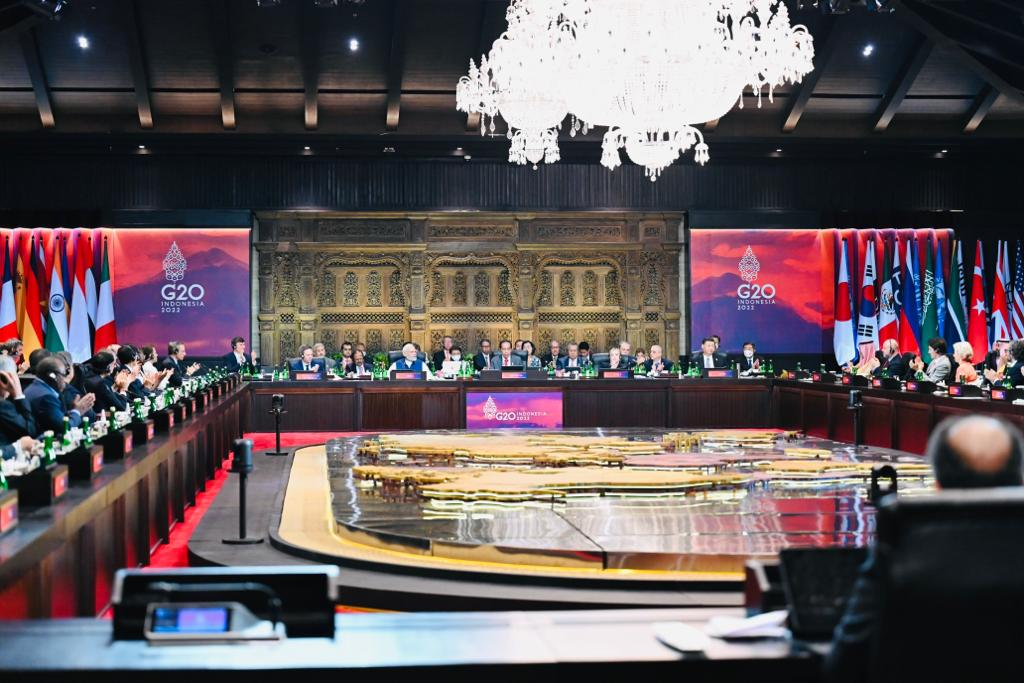
- G20 Summit in The Apurva Kempinski Bali
- Host country: Indonesia
- Motto: Recover Together, Recover Stronger (Indonesian: Pulih Bersama, Bangkit Perkasa)
- Cities: Nusa Dua, Badung Regency, Bali
- Venues: The Apurva Kempinski Hotel
- Participants: G20 members Invited States: Cambodia, Fiji, Netherlands, Rwanda, Senegal, Singapore, Spain, Suriname, Ukraine, United Arab Emirates; International bodies: FIFA, World Bank, OECD, United Nations, IMF, WTO, ILO, IOC, WHO, FSB, World Economic Forum, Islamic Development Bank, Asian Development Bank
- Chair: Joko Widodo

The 2022 G20 Bali summit (Indonesian: Konferensi Tingkat Tinggi G20 Bali 2022) was the seventeenth meeting of Group of Twenty (G20), a Head of State and Government meeting held in Nusa Dua, Bali, Indonesia. It was the first G20 summit hosted by Indonesia.

Indonesia's presidency began on 1 December 2021, leading up to the summit in the fourth quarter of 2022. The presidency handover ceremony was held as an intimate event, in which the G20 presidency gavel was transferred from Italian Prime Minister Mario Draghi to Indonesian president Joko Widodo at the close of the Rome summit. Preceding the G20 Leaders Summit, a youth engagement group of the G20, Youth20 (Y20) held its Y20 Indonesia 2022 Summit in Jakarta and Bandung in July 2022.

== Background ==
Initially, Indonesia was slated to host the G20 Summit in 2023. However, as Indonesia was also slated to hold the Chairmanship of ASEAN in 2023, India which was slated to hold the summit in 2022 agreed to exchange presidency timings with Indonesia. "Indonesia will hold the G20 Presidency in DEC 2022 while India will hold the Presidency a year after", said Retno. Indonesia's presidency commenced on 1 December 2021, following the transfer of presidency from Italian Prime Minister Mario Draghi to Indonesian president Joko Widodo at the closing of the Rome summit.

== Preparations ==
The Indonesian government budgeted Rp 674 billion (~USD 45 million) for the G20 events. For the event's security, the Indonesian government deployed around 10,000 police officers and 18,000 soldiers, including 6,000 soldiers from Kodam IX/Udayana headquartered in Bali. Shortly before, during, and after the summit, flights to Bali's I Gusti Ngurah Rai International Airport became restricted, with limited operating hours for commercial aircraft and a ban against commercial aircraft staying overnight. Some flights are redirected to nearby airports in Surabaya, Lombok, and Makassar.

=== Venue ===
Due to the COVID-19 pandemic, the economy of the tourism-dependent Bali had been devastated, with the G20 summit event being seen as an opportunity to boost tourism to the island to pre-pandemic levels. The main venue of the summit is at The Apurva Kempinski Bali resort in Nusa Dua, Badung Regency. Other venues that also took part of the G20 summit were the Bali International Convention Center for the media center, the Sofitel Bali Nusa Dua Beach Resort for the Spouse Program, Ngurah Rai Grand Forest Park for a mangrove planting session and Garuda Wisnu Kencana Cultural Park for the gala dinner as well as the traditional performances.

== Issues ==
=== Russia and Ukraine ===
Following the Russian invasion of Ukraine, some countries called for Russian president Vladimir Putin to be excluded from the G20. In March 2022, Polish economic development minister Piotr Nowak said that he had presented a proposal to exclude Russia in meetings with the United States, which United States president Joe Biden subsequently indicated support for. China's Ministry of Foreign Affairs spokesperson Wang Wenbin rejected these calls, saying that no member had the right to remove another country as member. Canadian Prime Minister Justin Trudeau said the group should "re-evaluate" Russia's participation. The Indonesian government initially attempted to keep the Russian invasion of Ukraine off of the meeting's agenda. Foreign Minister Retno Marsudi said her country's government would consider the views and suggestions of other members but that summit is meant to focus on pandemic and economic recovery.

In April 2022, United States Secretary of the Treasury Janet Yellen said she will not participate in sessions at the Bali summit which include Russian delegates. At the 2nd Finance Ministers and Central Bank Governor Meeting several weeks later, various finance officials including Yellen, President of the European Central Bank Christine Lagarde, Canadian Deputy Prime Minister Chrystia Freeland, and Ukrainian Finance Minister Serhiy Marchenko walked out when a Russian delegate began to speak at the event. At a press conference several days later, Freeland said that Canada wanted Russia removed from G20, and that Canadian delegates would not take part in meetings that included Russia. She said the removal of Russia was a significant topic of conversation among the delegates at the meetings, though there was not unanimity that Russia should be removed.

Indonesia's President Joko Widodo in April invited President of Ukraine, Volodymyr Zelenskyy, to the conference, while Putin confirmed in a phone call with Widodo that he would also attend the conference. Australian Prime Minister Anthony Albanese indicated that he would attend the conference regardless of Russia's presence. Trudeau also stated that Canada would still attend the conference if Putin were to attend. Following the 2022 G7 summit, German chancellor Olaf Scholz noted that the G7 leaders "did not want to drive G20 apart", and European Commission head Ursula von der Leyen noted that she would not oppose attending the conference with Putin. Italian Prime Minister Giorgia Meloni claimed she would be attending.

On 10 November 2022, the Russian embassy in Jakarta confirmed that Putin would skip the G20 summit, with Foreign Affairs Minister Sergey Lavrov instead attending in his place.

== Outcome ==
=== Russia–Ukraine War ===
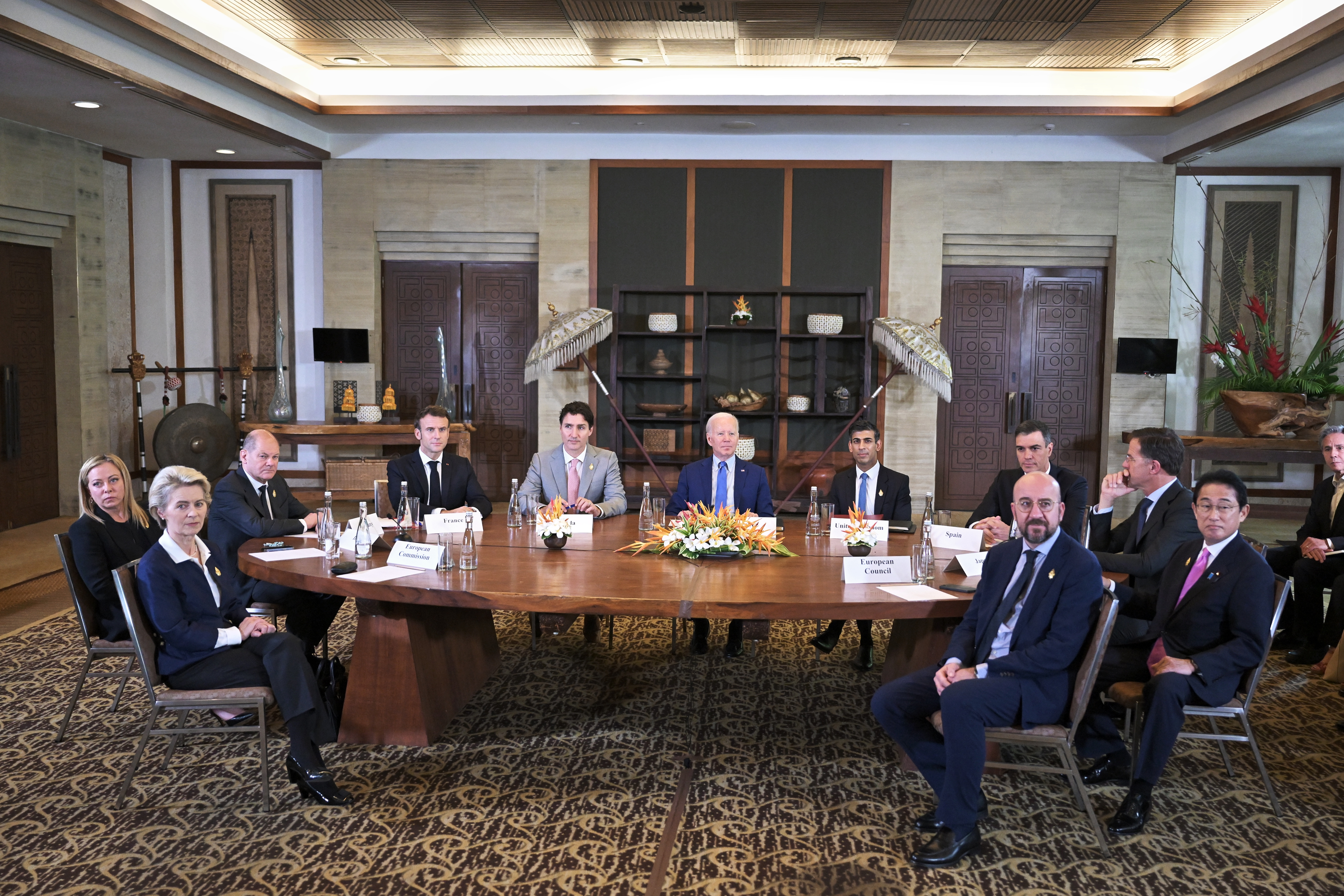
Emergency meeting on 16 November 2022.

During the summit, US President Joe Biden said that he and Chinese leader Xi Jinping jointly agreed that Russia should not use nuclear weapons in Ukraine while Chinese state media outlet Xinhua said that Chinese Foreign Minister Wang Yi told his Russian counterpart Sergei Lavrov that Moscow's position of eschewing nuclear warfare showed the country's "rational" and "responsible" attitude. Ukrainian president Volodymyr Zelenskyy addressed the meeting virtually, referring to it as the "G19" in a snub against Russia. The Washington Post reported that China along with Russia opposed the usage of the word "war" to describe Russia's invasion of Ukraine and its inclusion into the text of the G20's final communiqué. The joint declaration eventually included a statement that "most members" condemned Russia's invasion, although also acknowledging "that there were other views and different assessments of the situation".

Due to the 2022 missile explosion in Poland, the summit's schedule was briefly interrupted on the second day as G7 and some NATO leaders in the summit held an emergency meeting. Russian foreign minister Sergey Lavrov had left the summit late in the first day, prior to the incident. Many of the G20 leaders also declined to be photographed along with Lavrov or a Russian delegation, resulting in the lack of a G20 "family photo" in 2022. During a speech at the summit, Zelenskyy proposed a 10-point peace plan, which demanded Russia "withdraw all its troops and armed formations from the territory of Ukraine".

=== US–China relations ===
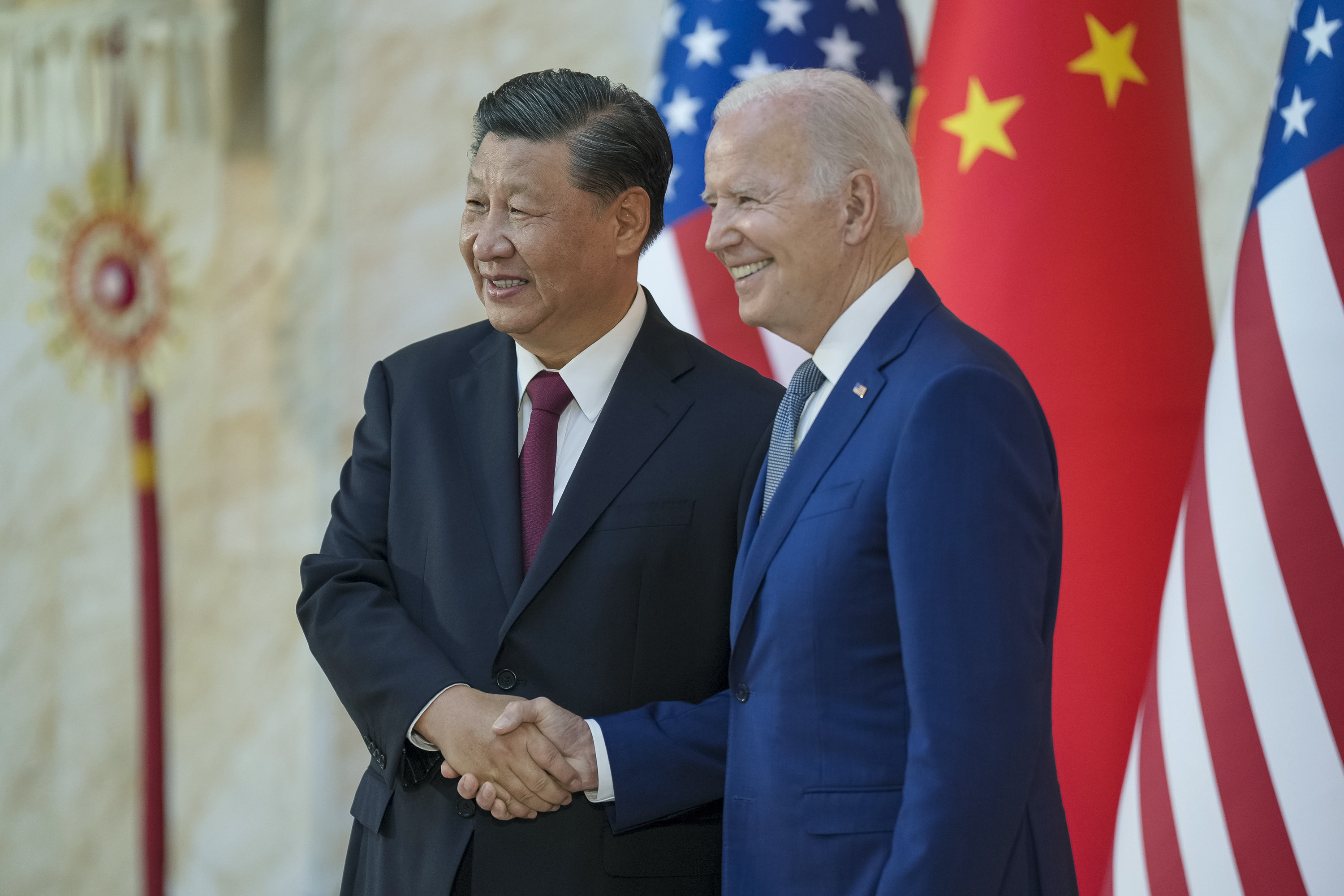
United States President Joe Biden met with Chinese leader Xi Jinping on 14 November 2022. It was the first time they met in person since Biden became president.

In the lead up to the conference, US officials had contacted their Chinese counterparts in order to arrange a meeting between Biden and Xi, and the meeting between the two occurred on 14 November, taking three hours. The meeting was designated to help restore relations and communication between the two countries, which had deteriorated following the 2022 visit by Nancy Pelosi to Taiwan. Biden later declared that there would not be a "new Cold War" between the US and China. although the two leaders did not declare an agreement on the Taiwan question.

=== China–Canada relations ===
Chinese leader Xi Jinping and Canadian Prime Minister Justin Trudeau engaged in a heated exchange at the G20 summit in Indonesia, captured by the media pool. Xi expressed frustration over leaked details of a previous meeting, deeming it inappropriate and questioning Trudeau's sincerity. The incident highlighted the strained relationship between the leaders, fueled by Canada's concerns over China's interference activities. Trudeau emphasized the importance of constructive engagement while standing firm on Canadian values during a subsequent media address. The confrontation underscores geopolitical tensions and the challenges of balancing diplomatic dialogue with human rights advocacy.

=== Indonesian decarbonisation ===
The G7 countries, EU, Denmark and Norway announced a 20 billion US-dollar deal to decarbonise Indonesia's coal-powered economy, the so-called Indonesia Just Energy Transition Partnership.

== Participating leaders ==
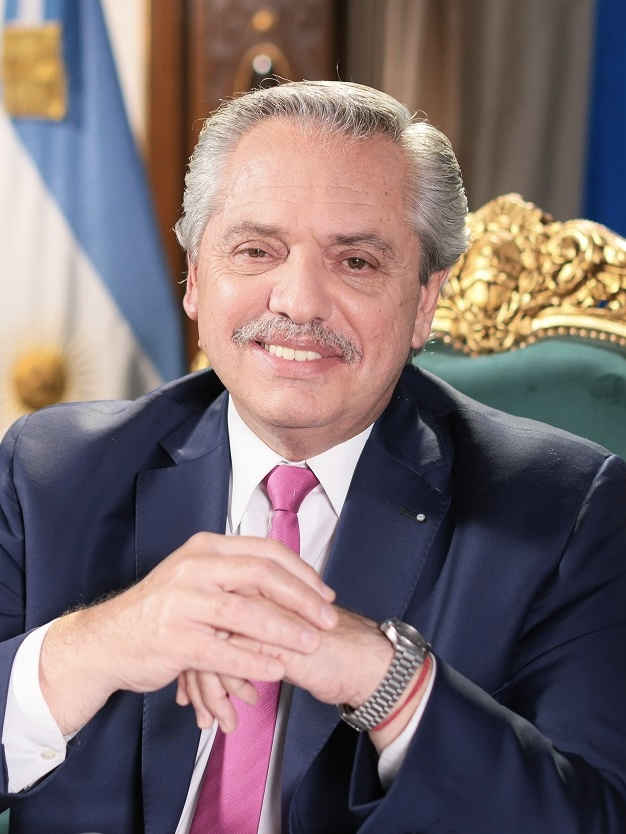
Argentina
Alberto Fernández, President

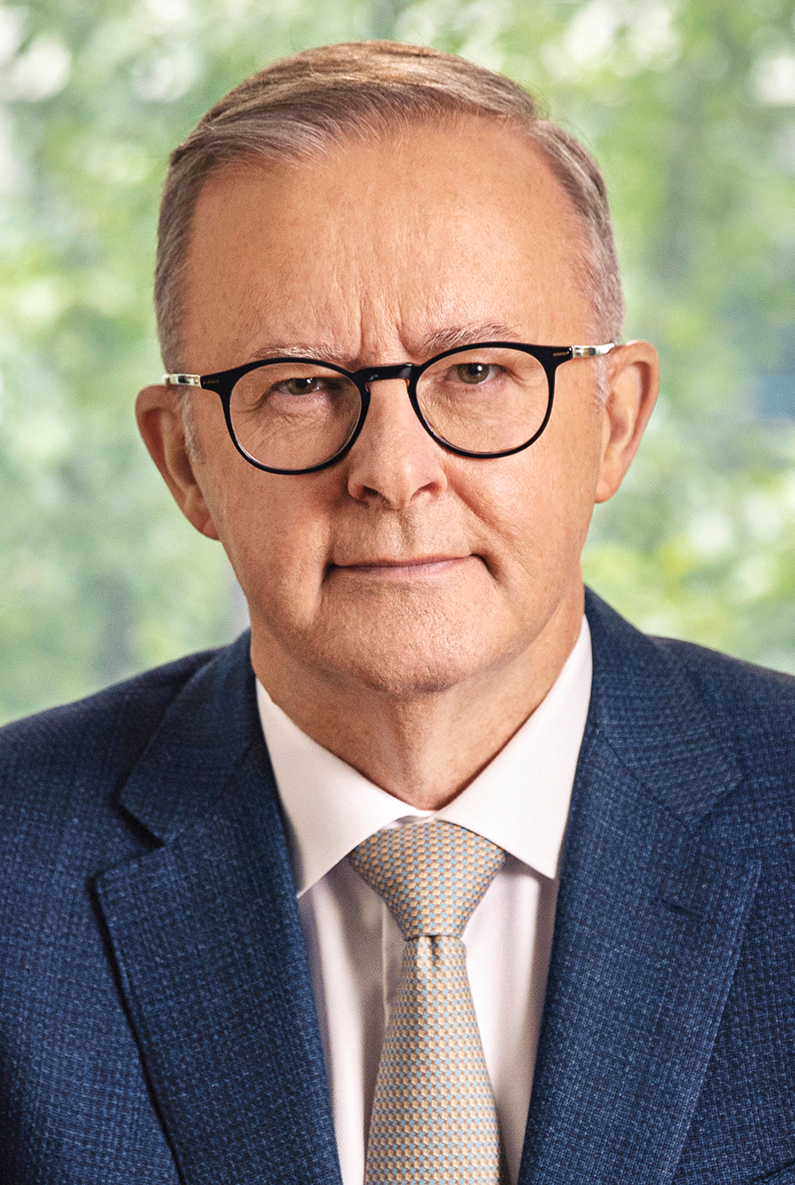
Australia
Anthony Albanese, Prime Minister

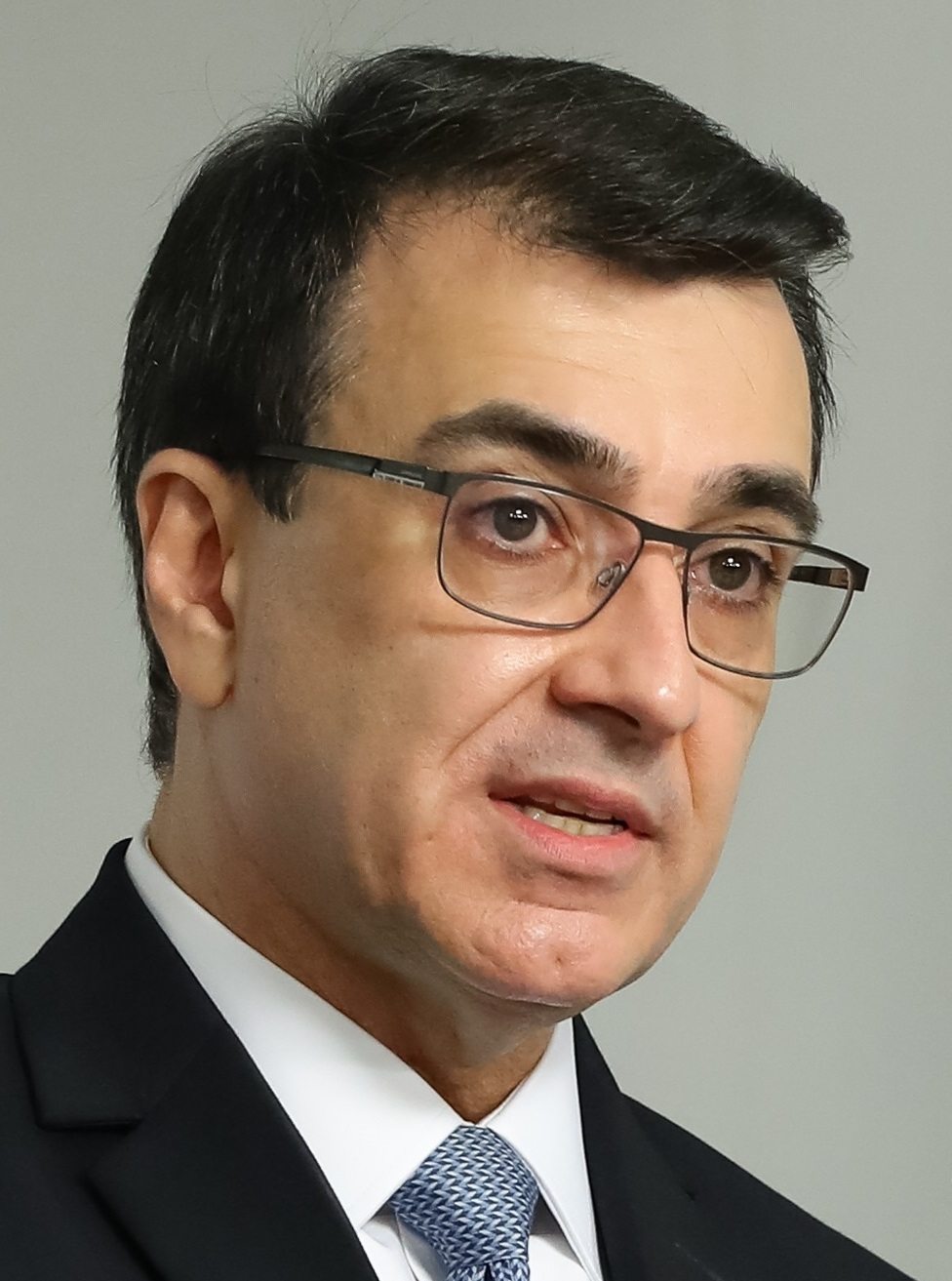
Brazil
Carlos Alberto França, Foreign Minister

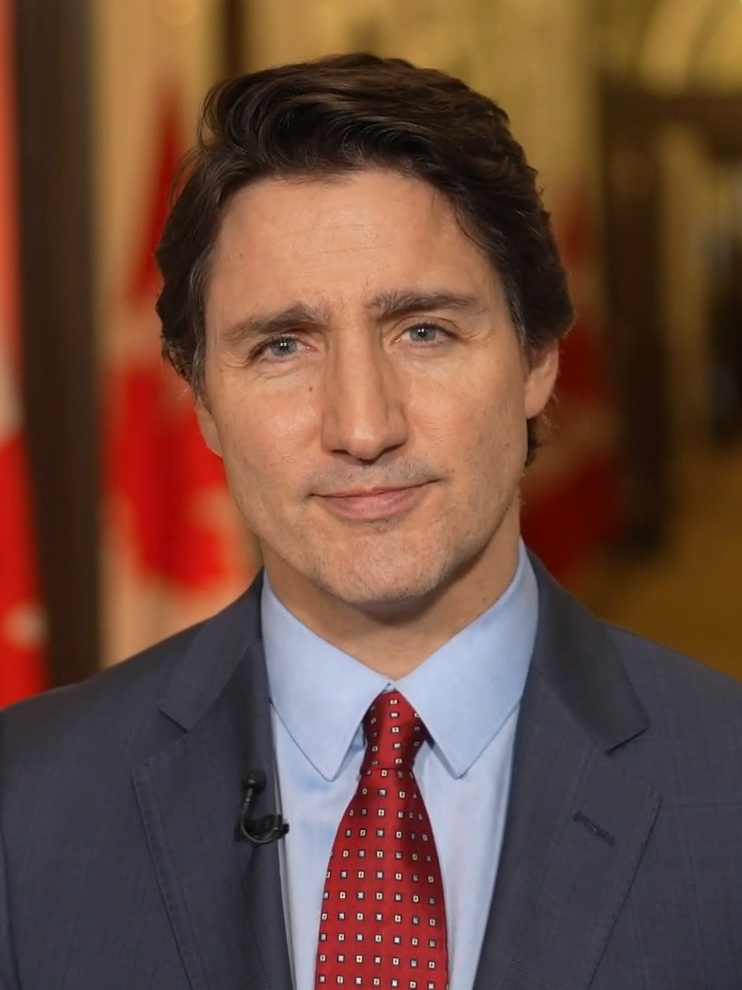
Canada
Justin Trudeau, Prime Minister

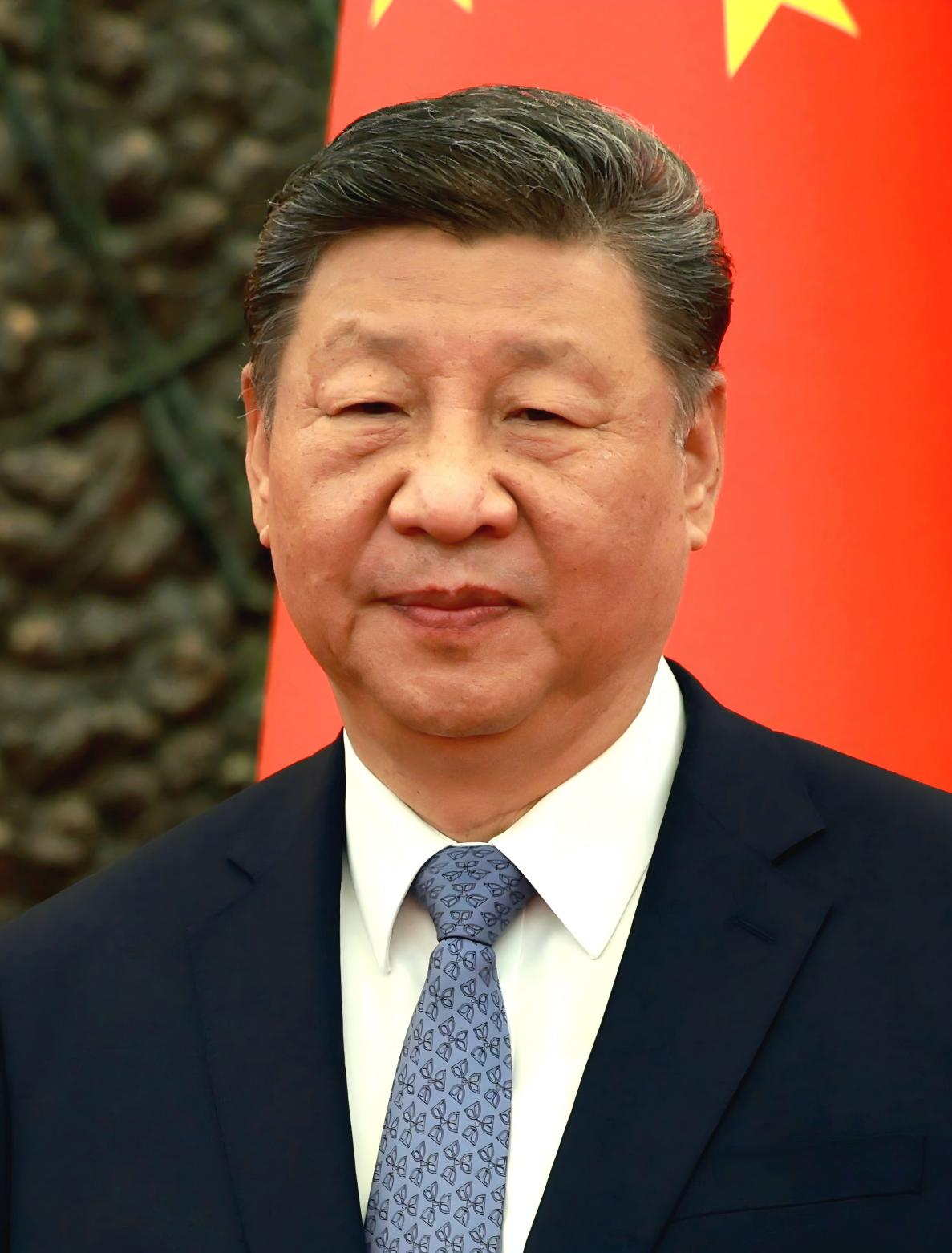
China
Xi Jinping, CCP General Secretary and President (Note: The president of China is legally a ceremonial office, but the general secretary of the Chinese Communist Party (de facto leader in a one-party communist state) has always held this office since 1993 except for the months of transition, and the current general secretary is Xi Jinping, who is also the Chinese president.)

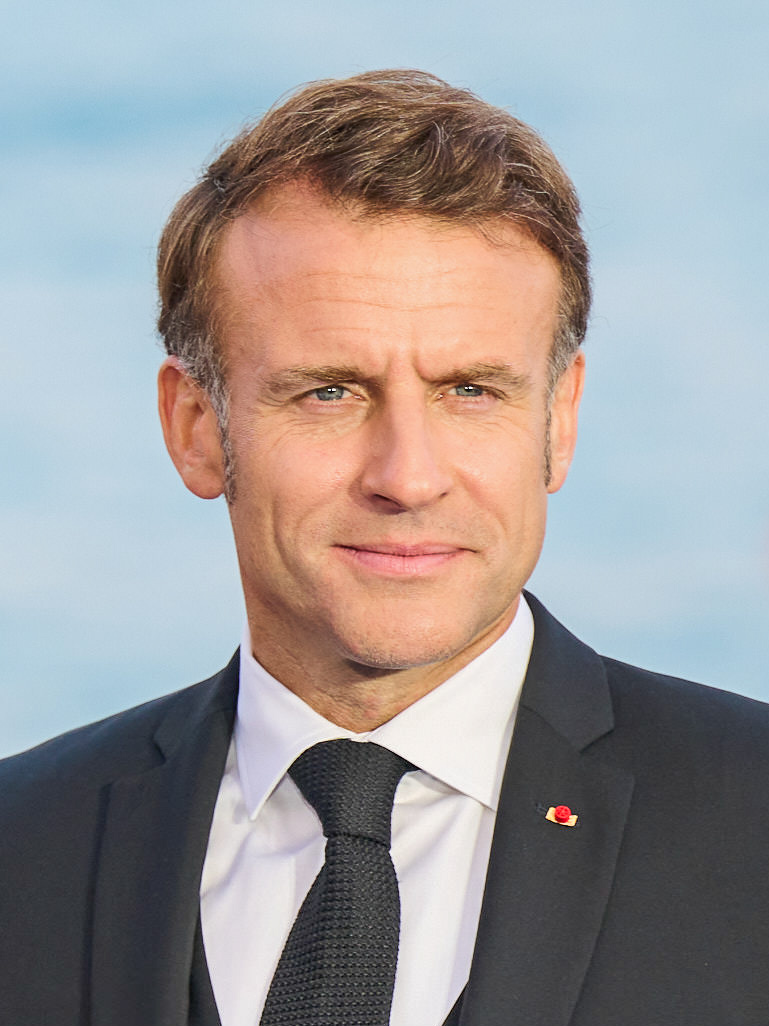
(France) France
Emmanuel Macron,
President

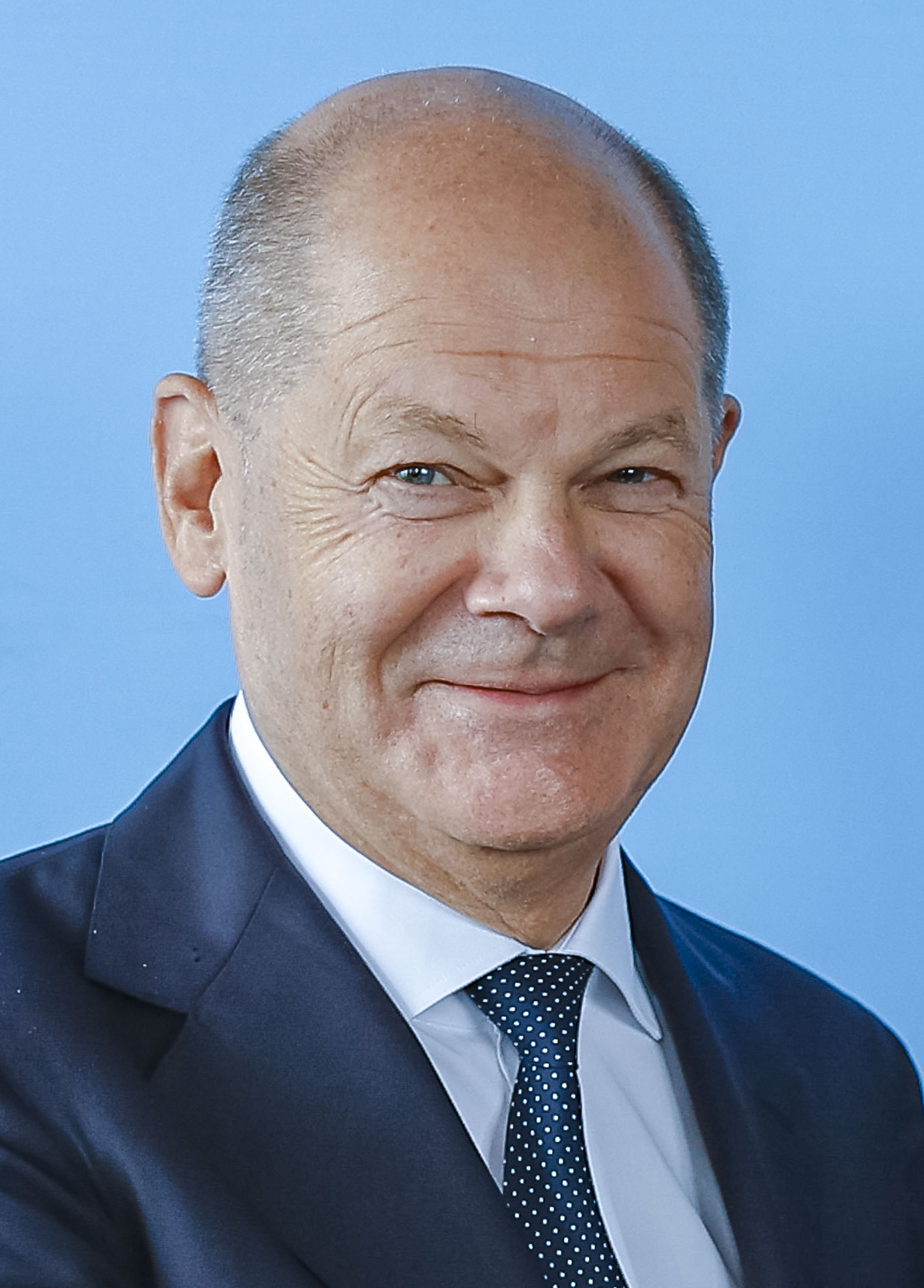
Germany
Olaf Scholz, Chancellor

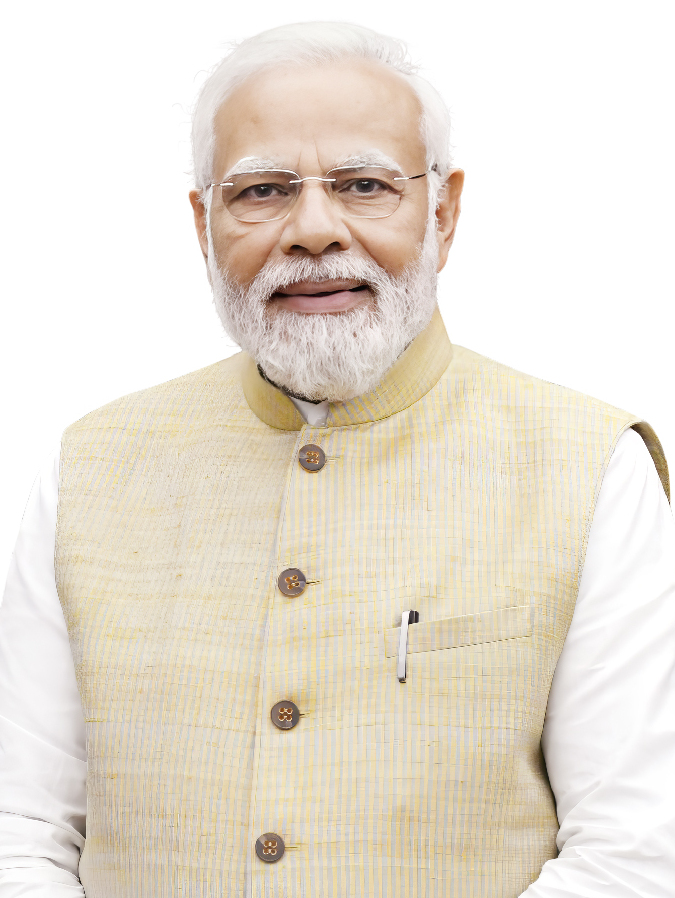
India
Narendra Modi, Prime Minister

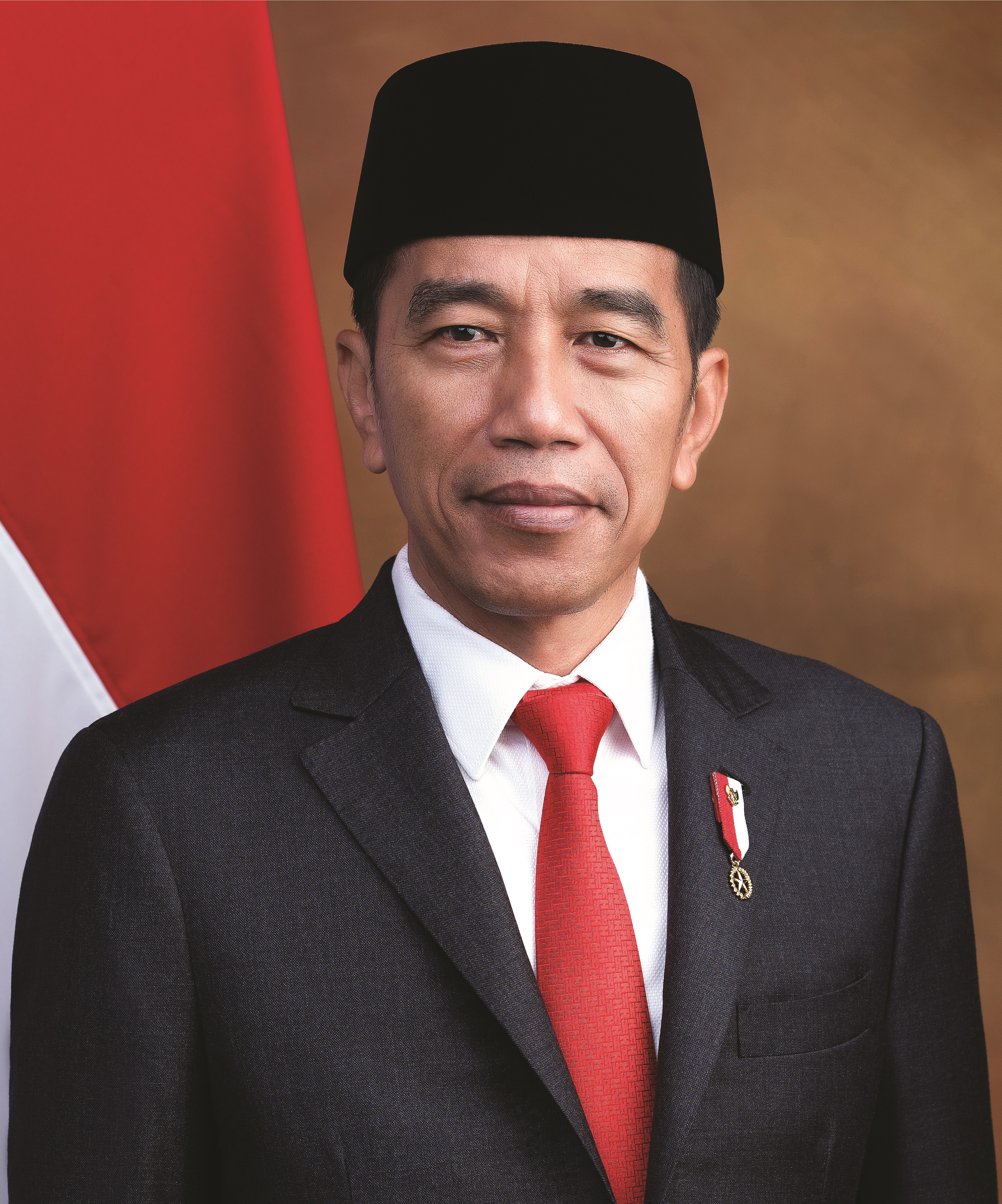
Indonesia
Joko Widodo, President (Host)

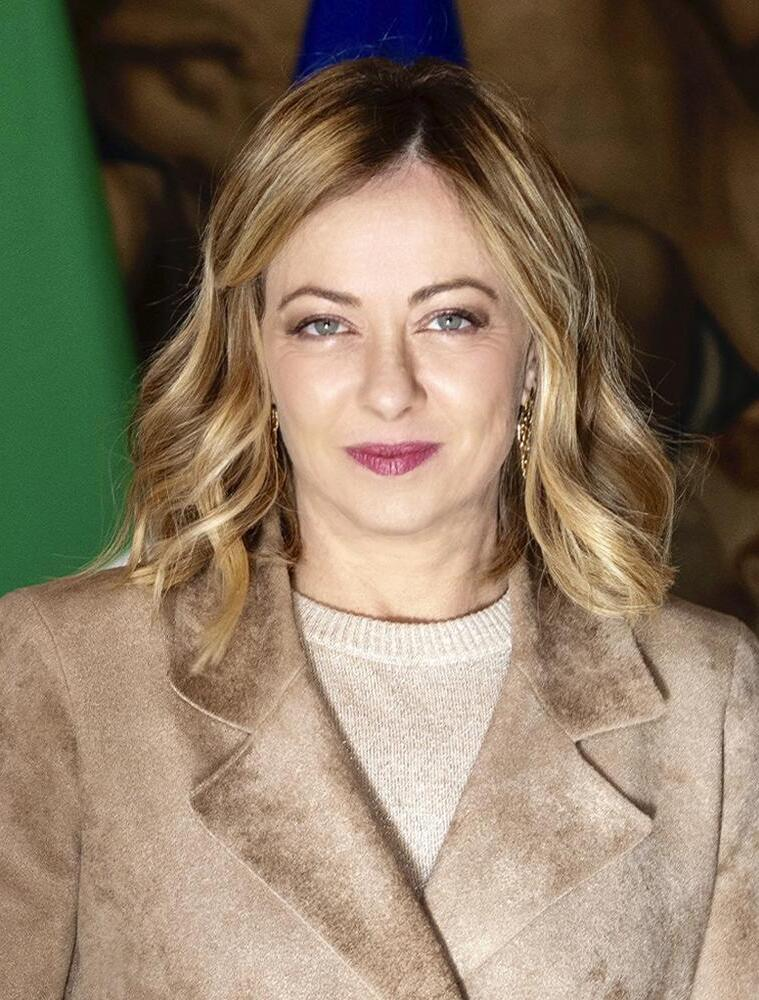
Italy
Giorgia Meloni, Prime Minister

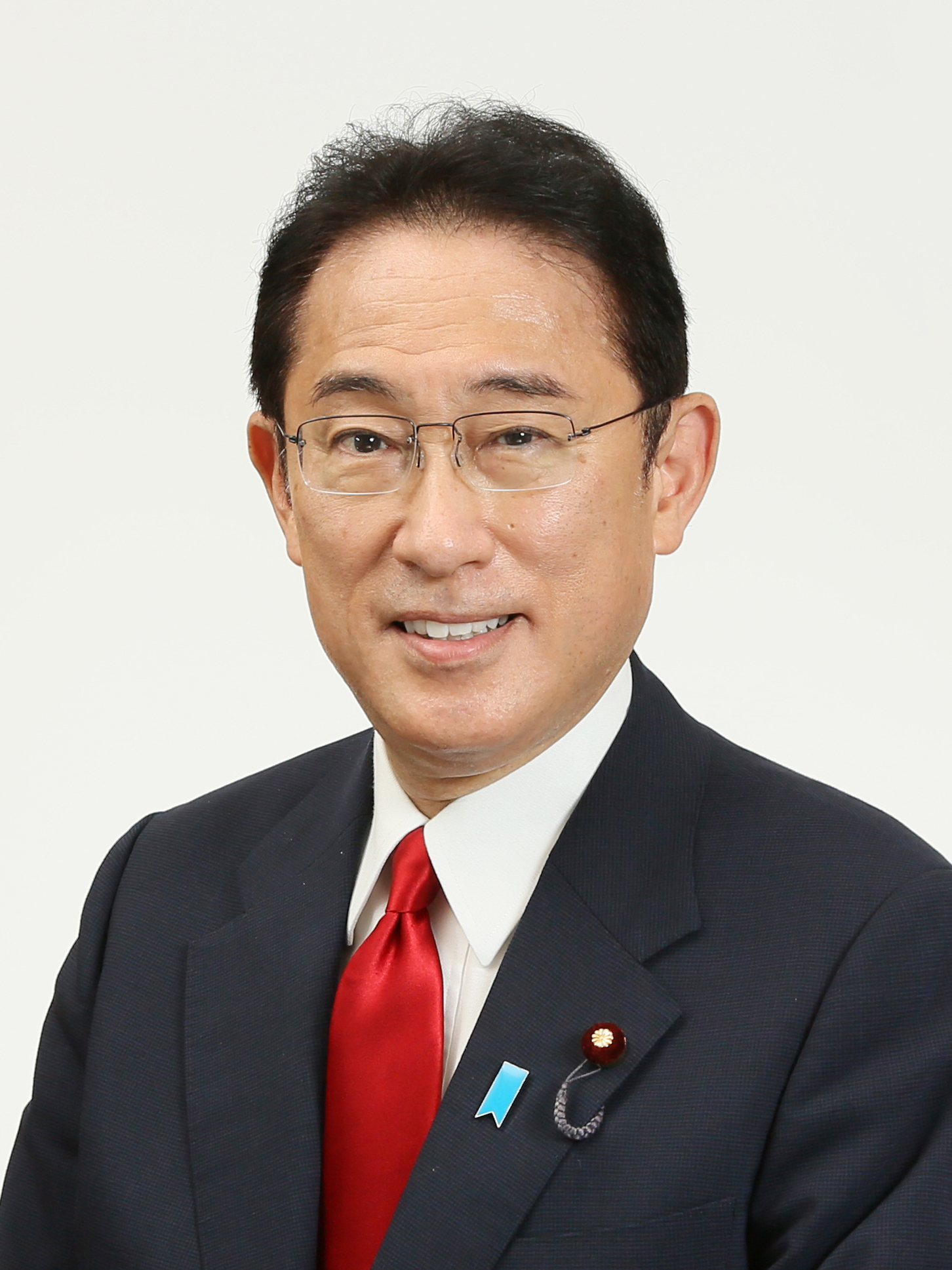
Japan
Fumio Kishida, Prime Minister

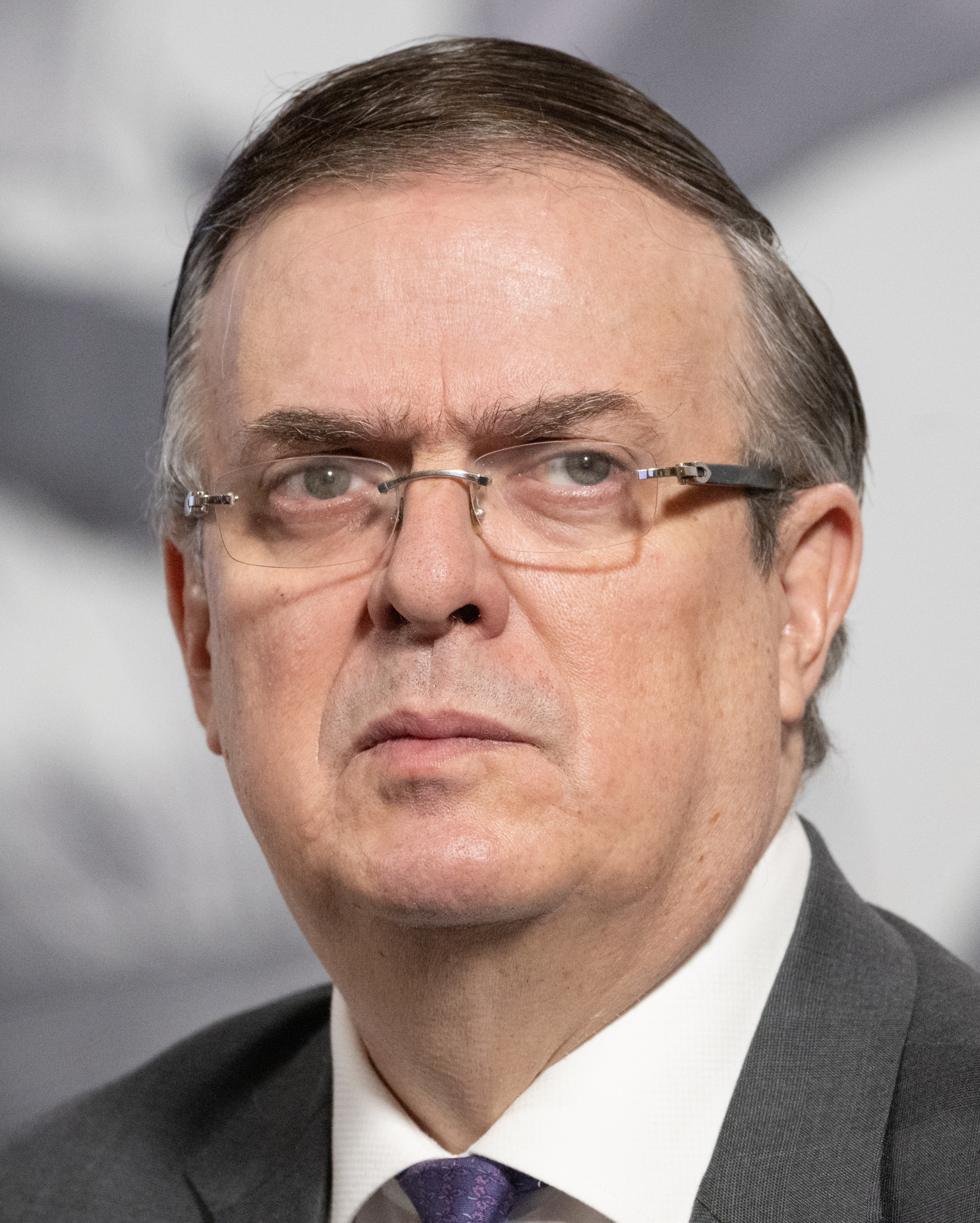
Mexico
Marcelo Ebrard, Secretary of Foreign Affairs

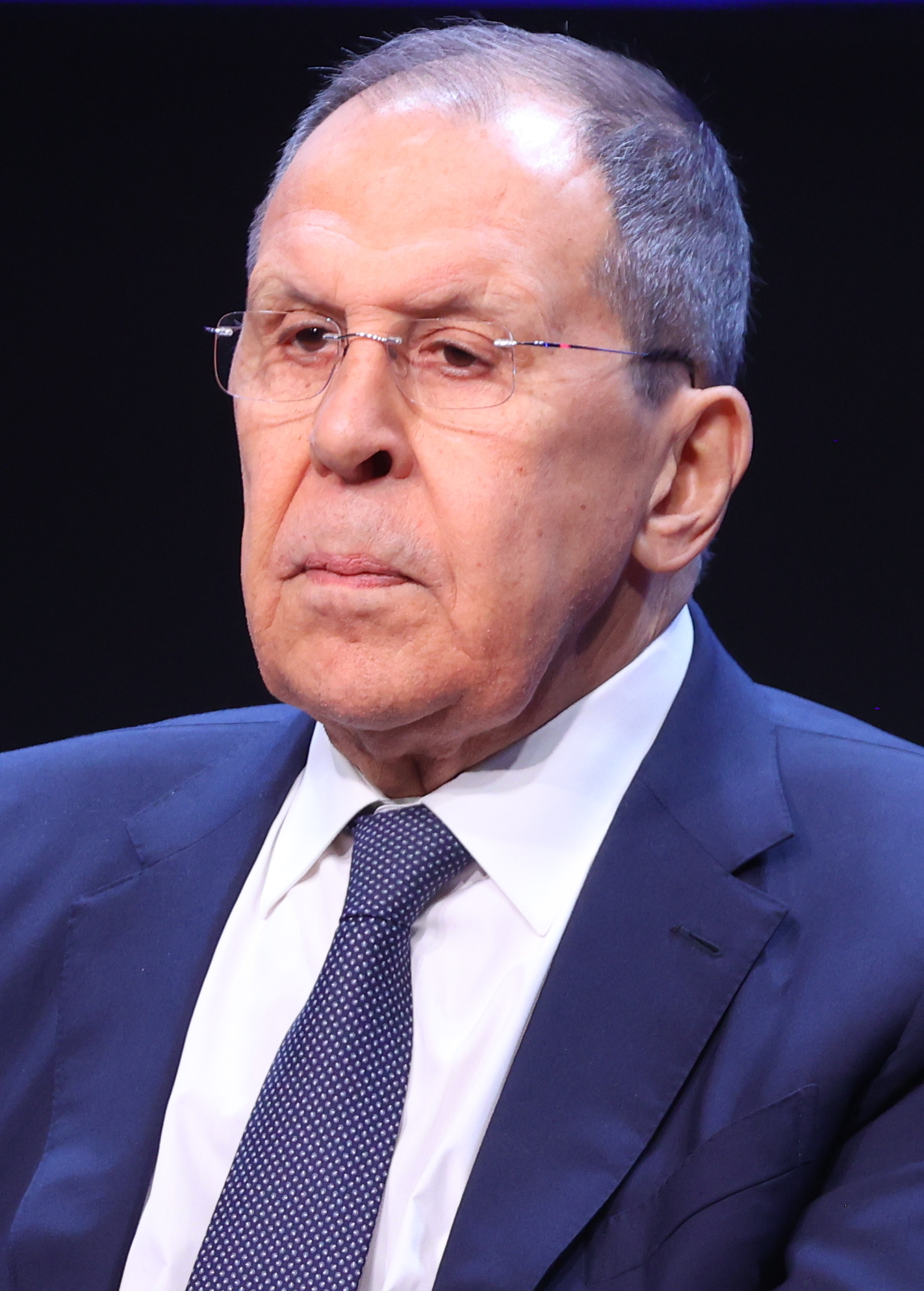
Russia
Sergei Lavrov, Foreign Minister

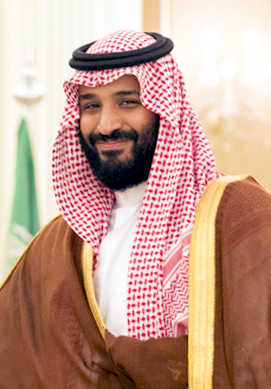
Saudi Arabia
Mohammad bin Salman, Crown Prince and Prime Minister

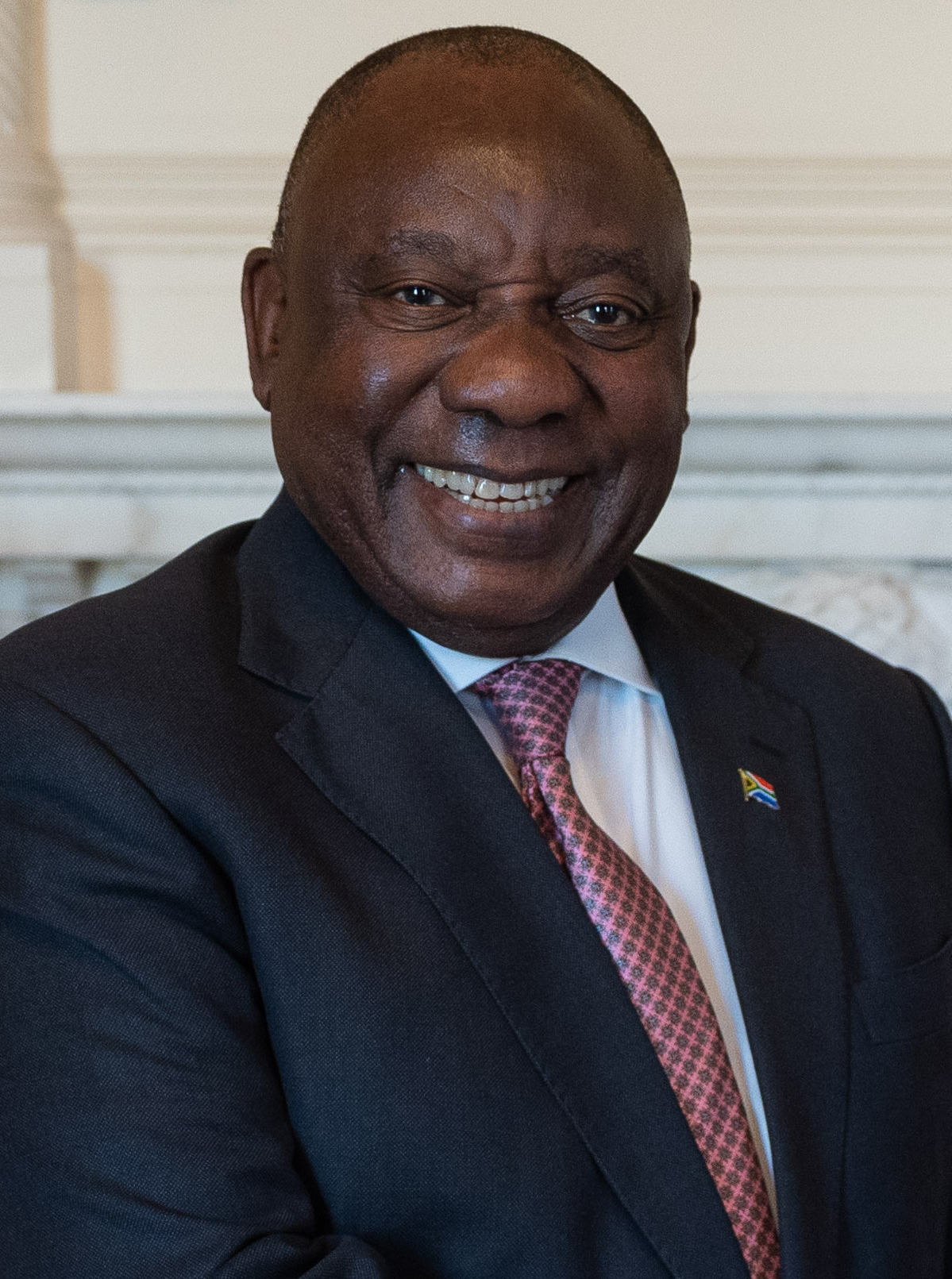
South Africa
Cyril Ramaphosa, President

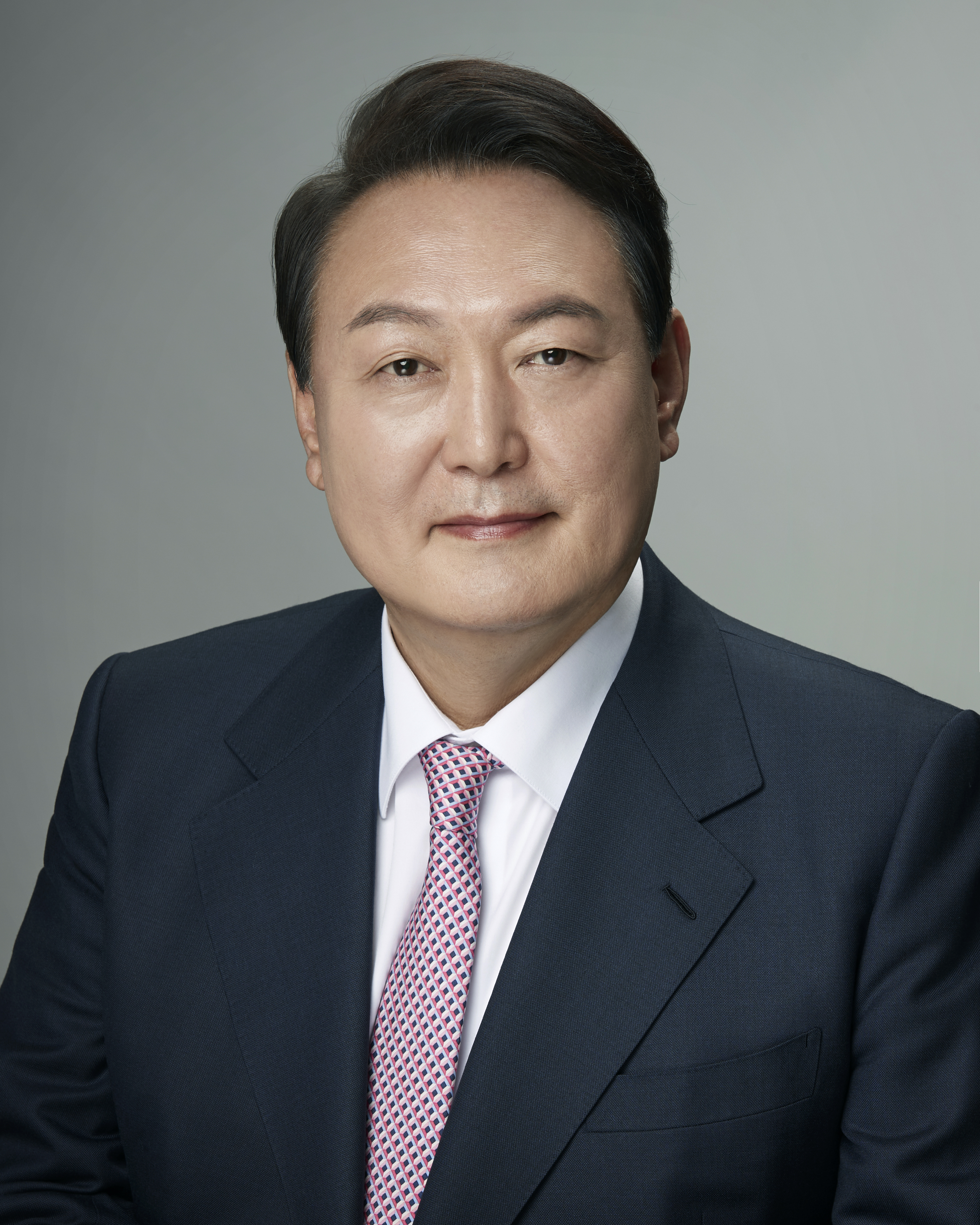
South Korea
Yoon Suk-yeol, President

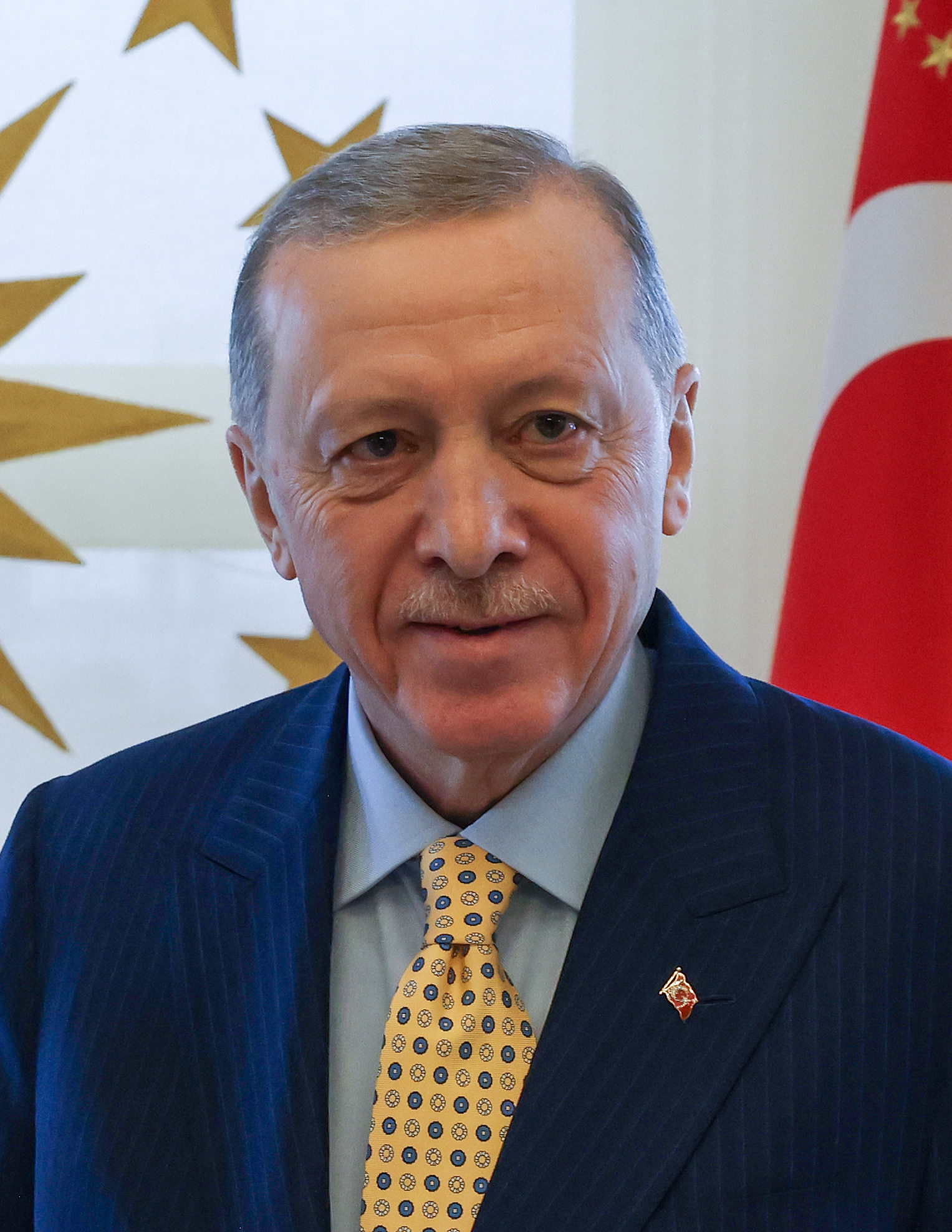
Turkey
Recep Tayyip Erdoğan, President

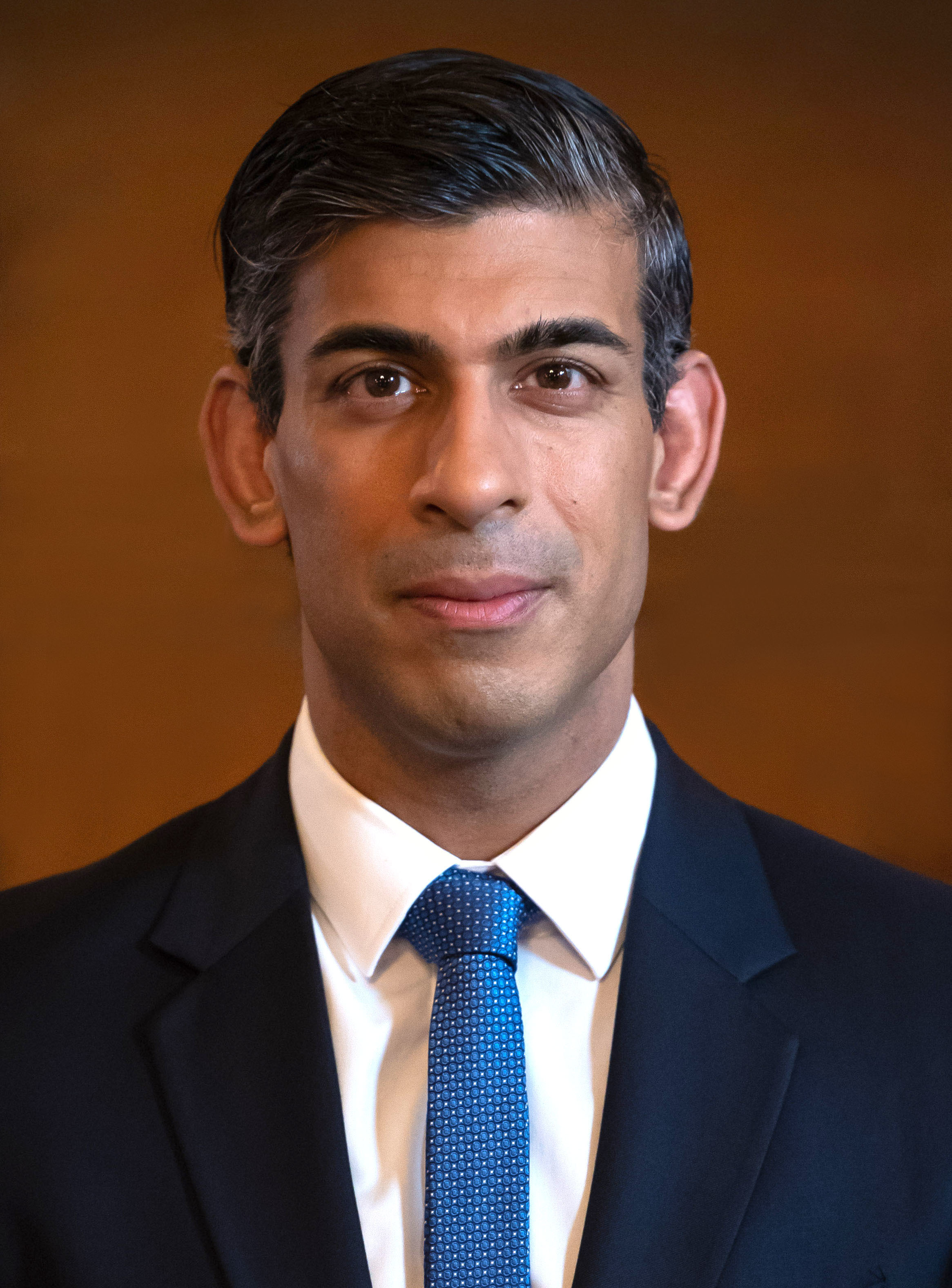
United Kingdom
Rishi Sunak, Prime Minister

United States
Joe Biden, President

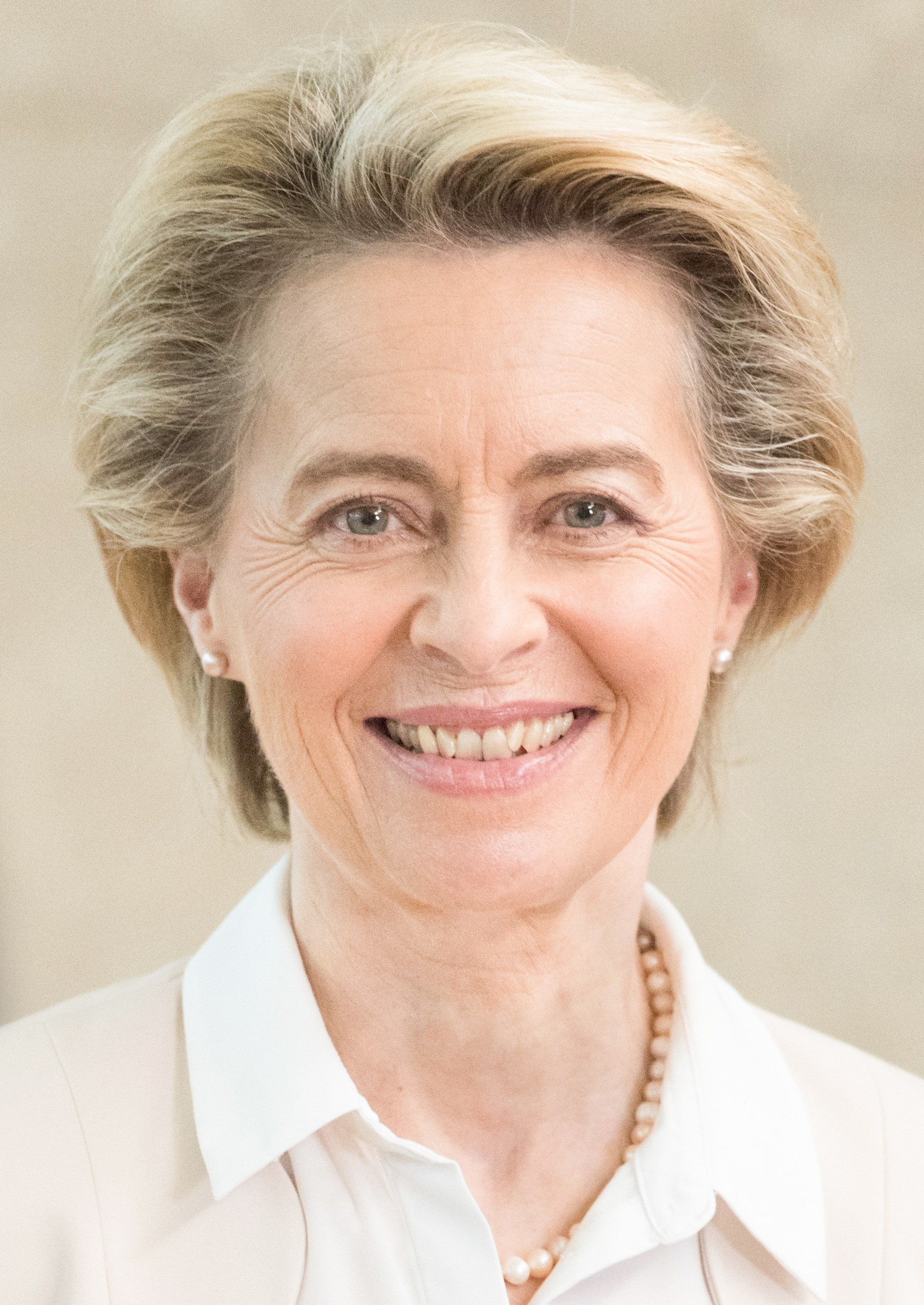
European Union
Ursula von der Leyen, President of the European Commission

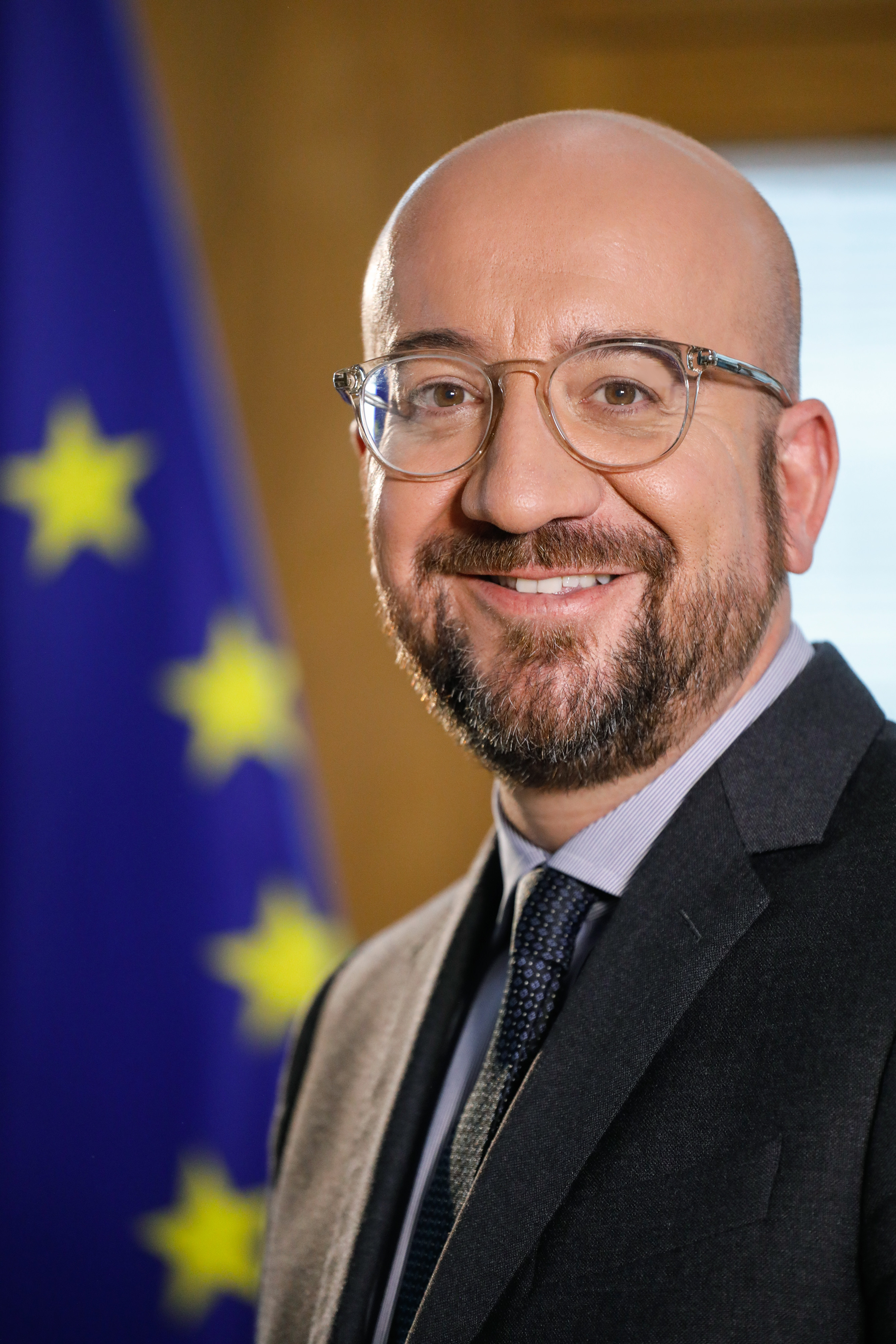
European Union
Charles Michel, President of the European Council

== Participating invited guests ==
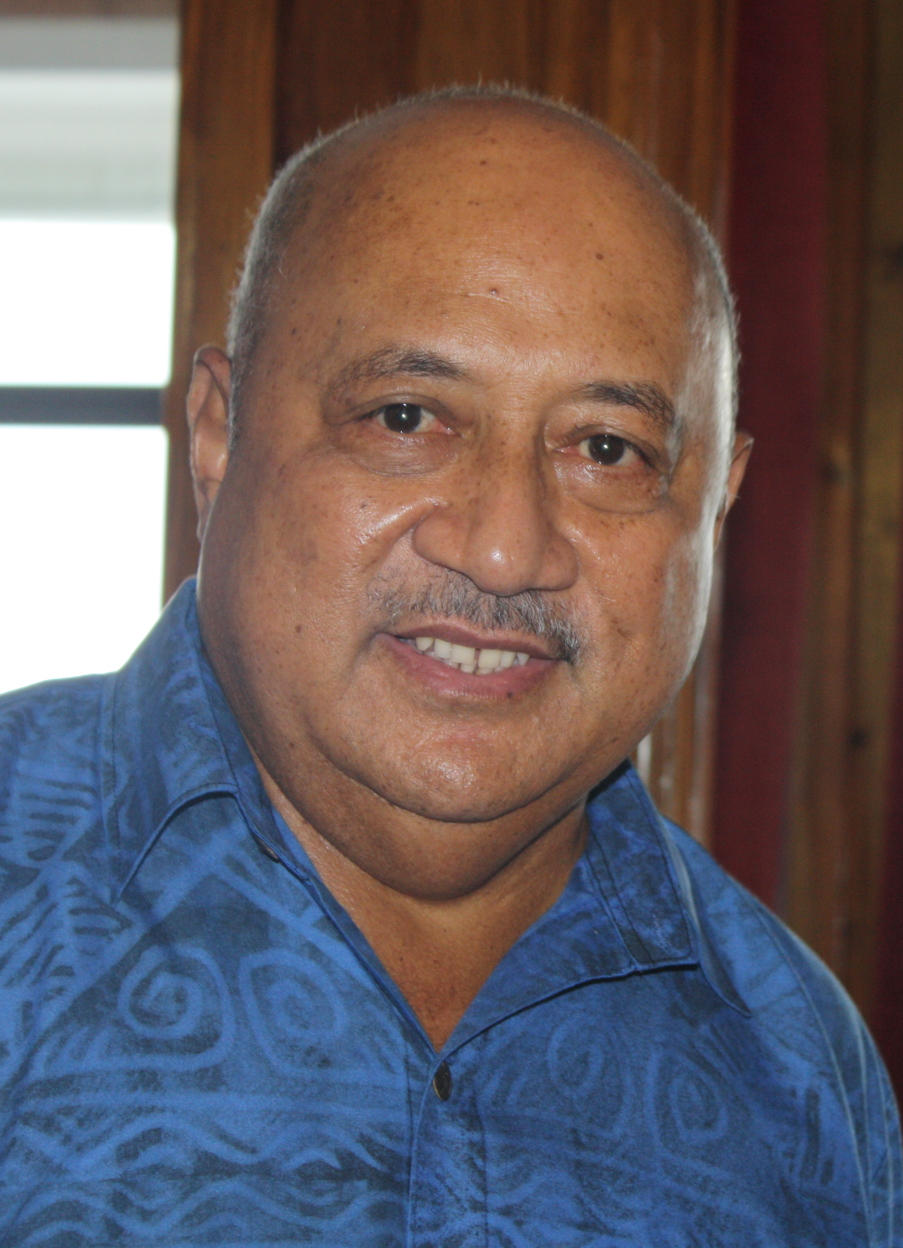
Fiji
Inoke Kubuabola, Special Envoy
2022 Chairperson of the Pacific Islands Forum

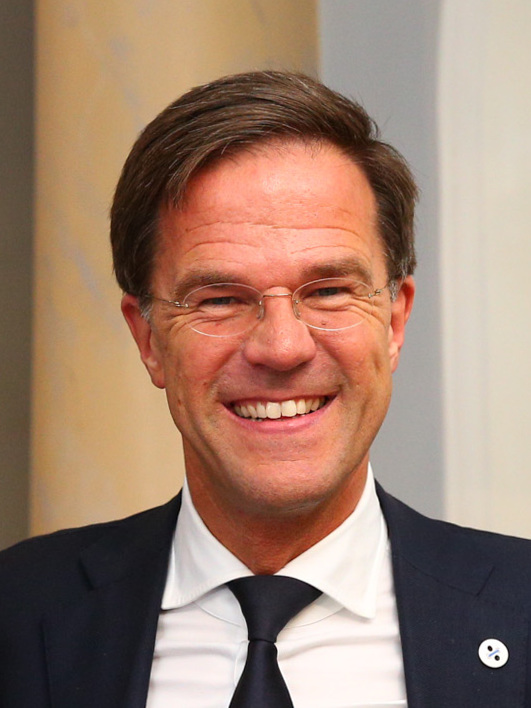
Netherlands
Mark Rutte, Prime Minister

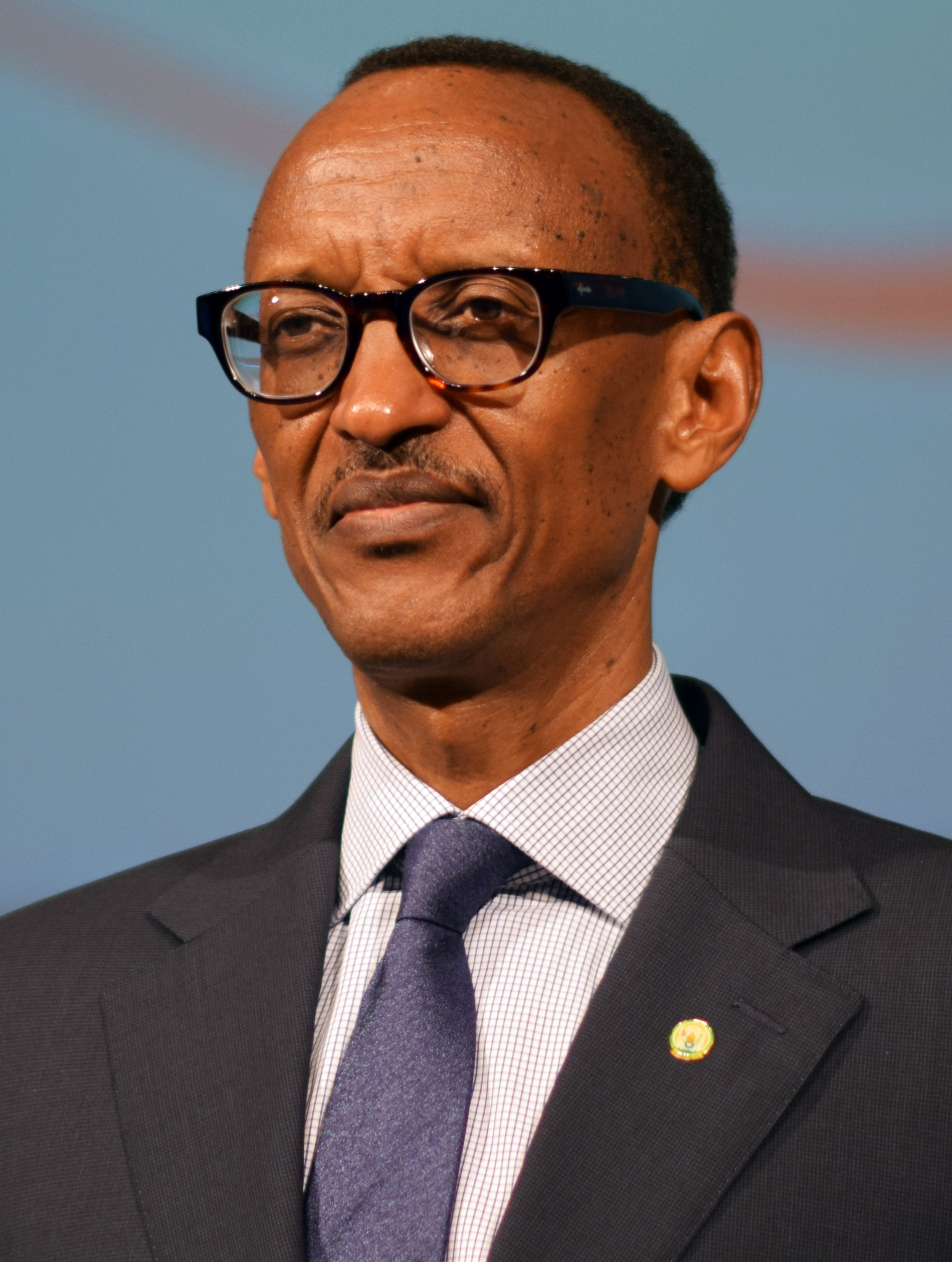
Rwanda
Paul Kagame, President, 2022 Chairperson of NEPAD

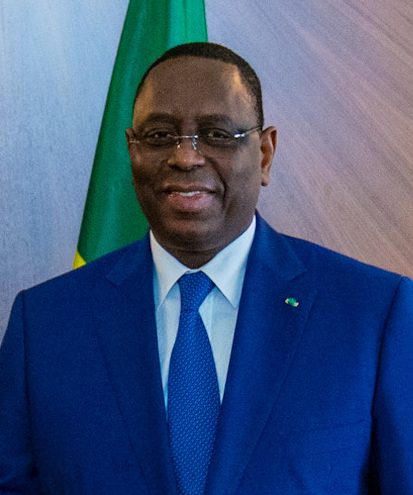
Senegal
Macky Sall, President, 2022 Chairperson of the African Union

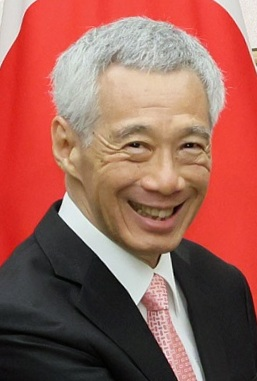
Singapore
Lee Hsien Loong, Prime Minister
Chairperson of the Global Governance Group

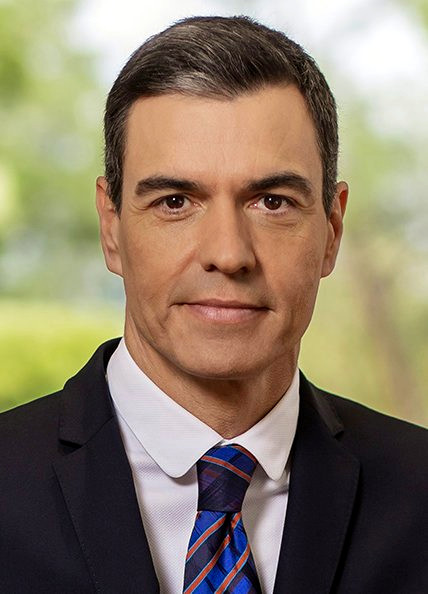
Spain
Pedro Sánchez, Prime Minister
Permanent guest invitee

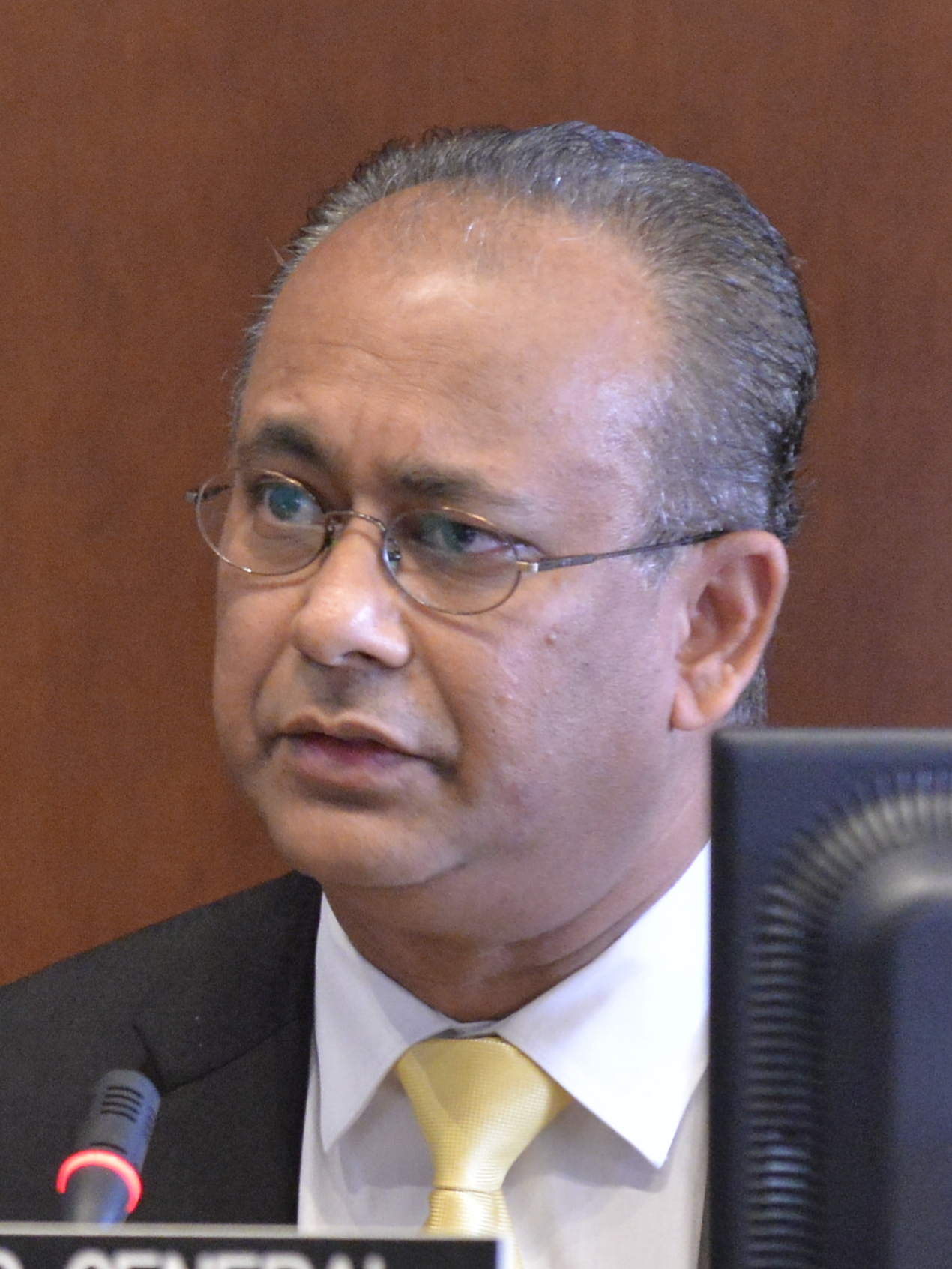
Suriname
Albert Ramdin, Foreign Minister
2022 Chairperson of the Caribbean Community

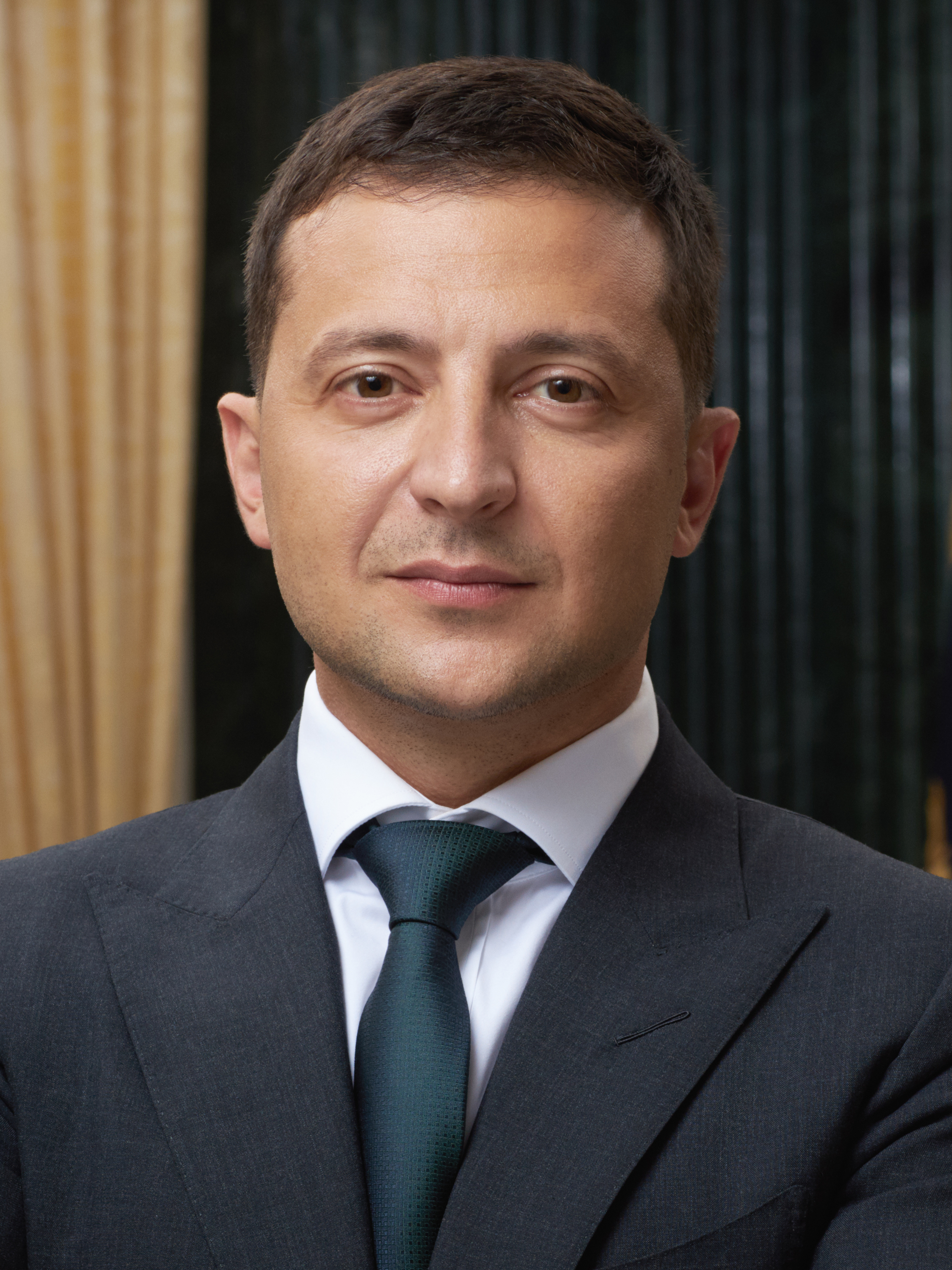
Ukraine
Volodymyr Zelenskyy, President
(Virtual)

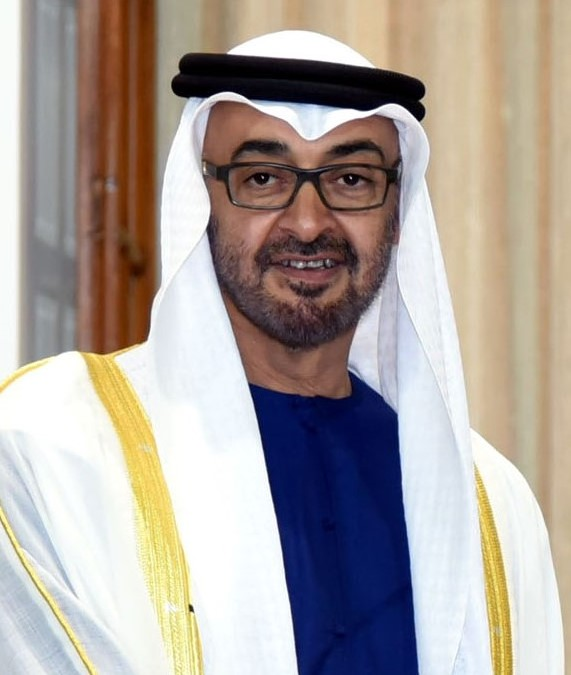
United Arab Emirates
Mohamed bin Zayed Al Nahyan, President

=== Absent guests ===
Prime Minister of Cambodia, as well as 2022 Chairperson of Association of Southeast Asian Nations, Hun Sen cancelled his attendance and returned to Cambodia before the start of the summit because he was tested positive for COVID-19.

== Participating international organization guests ==
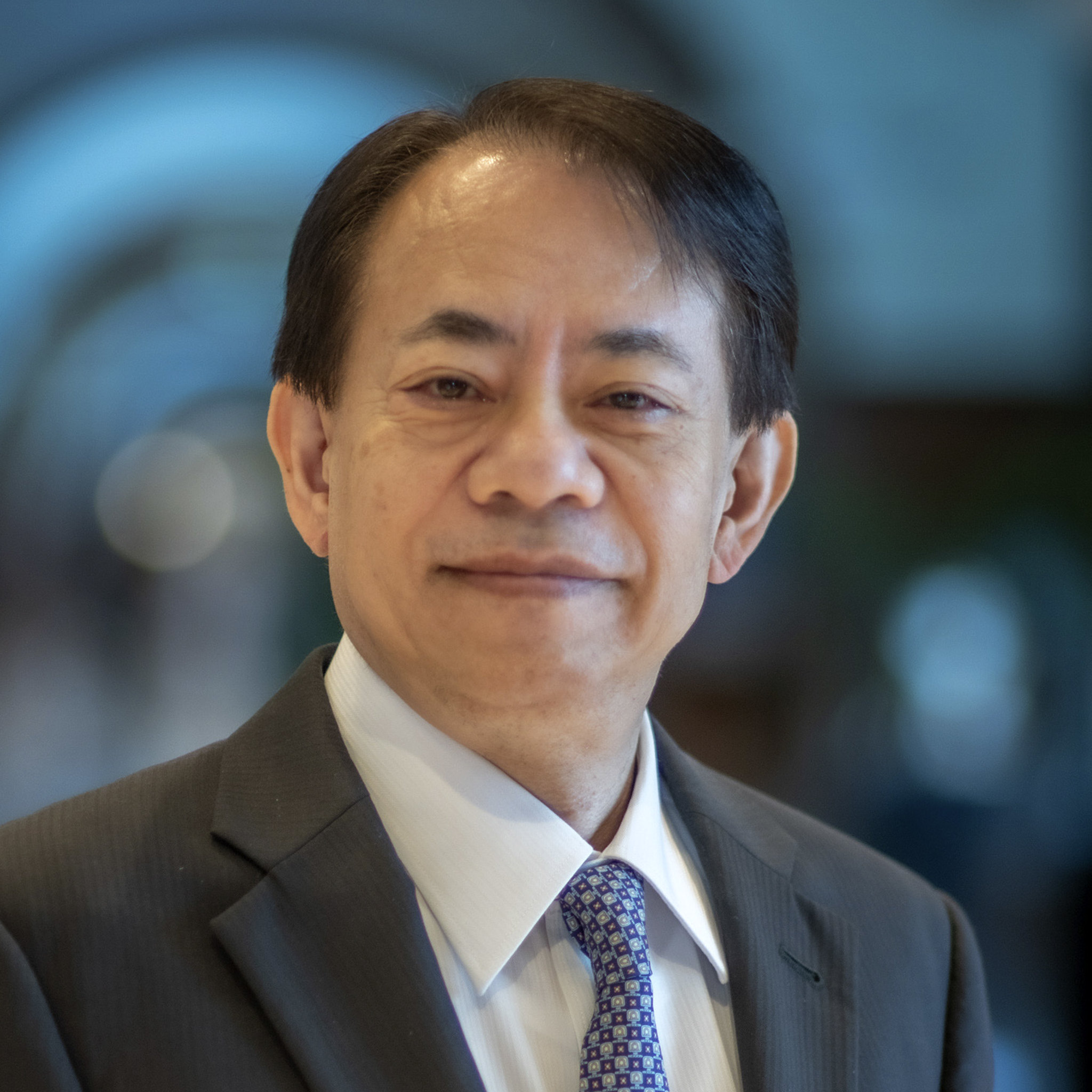
Asian Development Bank
Masatsugu Asakawa, President

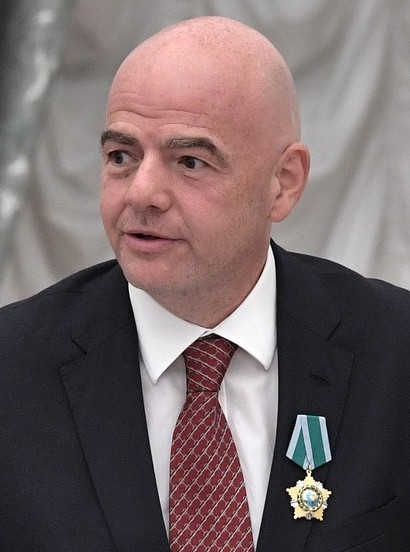
FIFA
Gianni Infantino, President

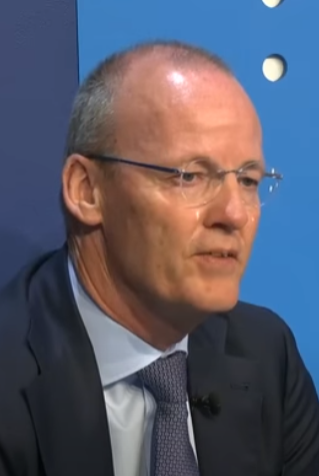
Financial Stability Board
Klaas Knot, Chair

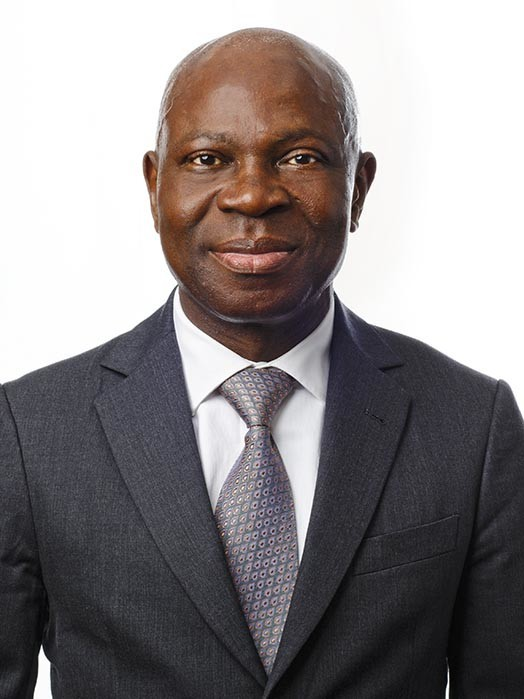
International Labour Organization
Gilbert Houngbo, Director-General

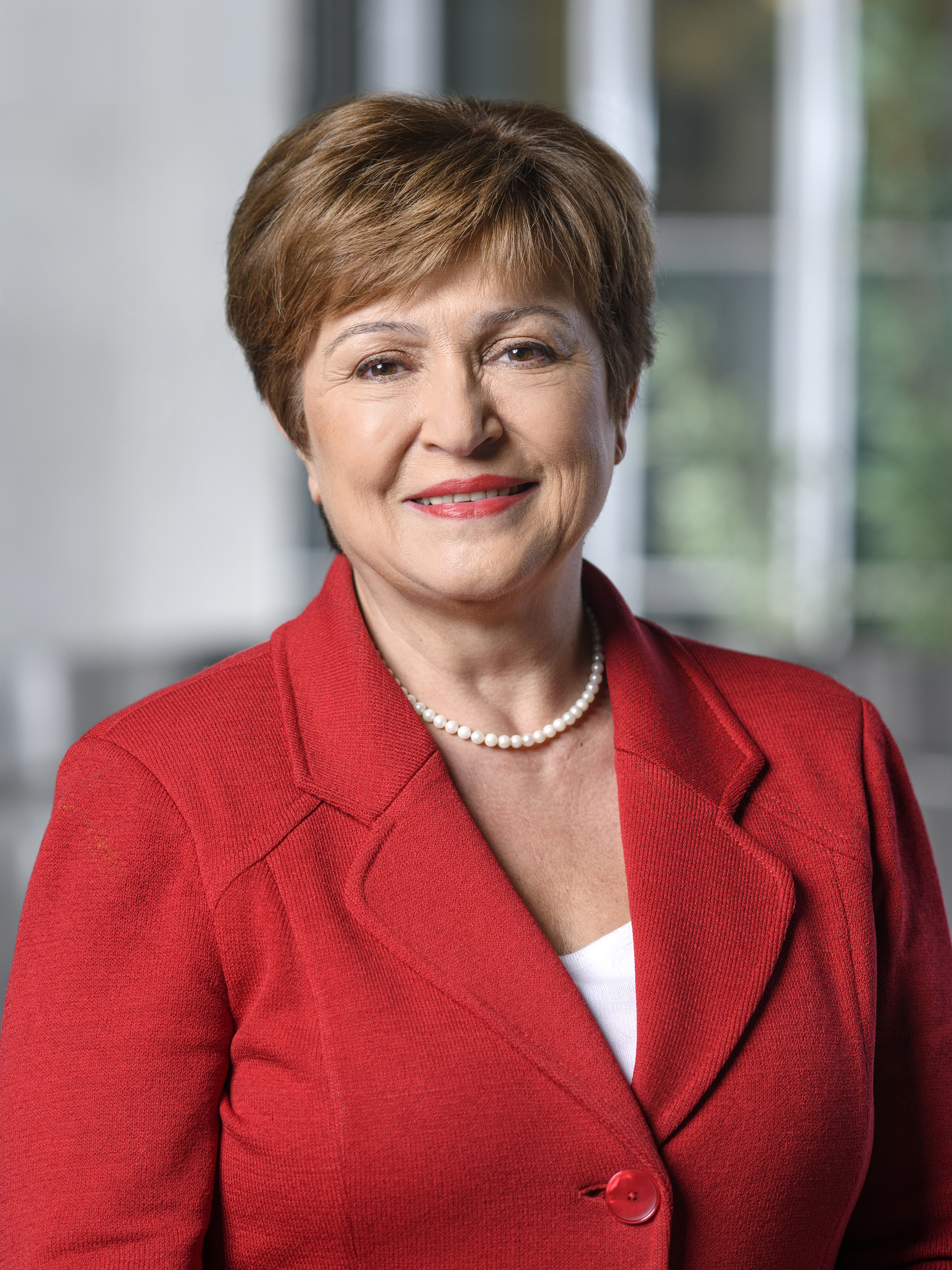
International Monetary Fund
Kristalina Georgieva, Managing Director

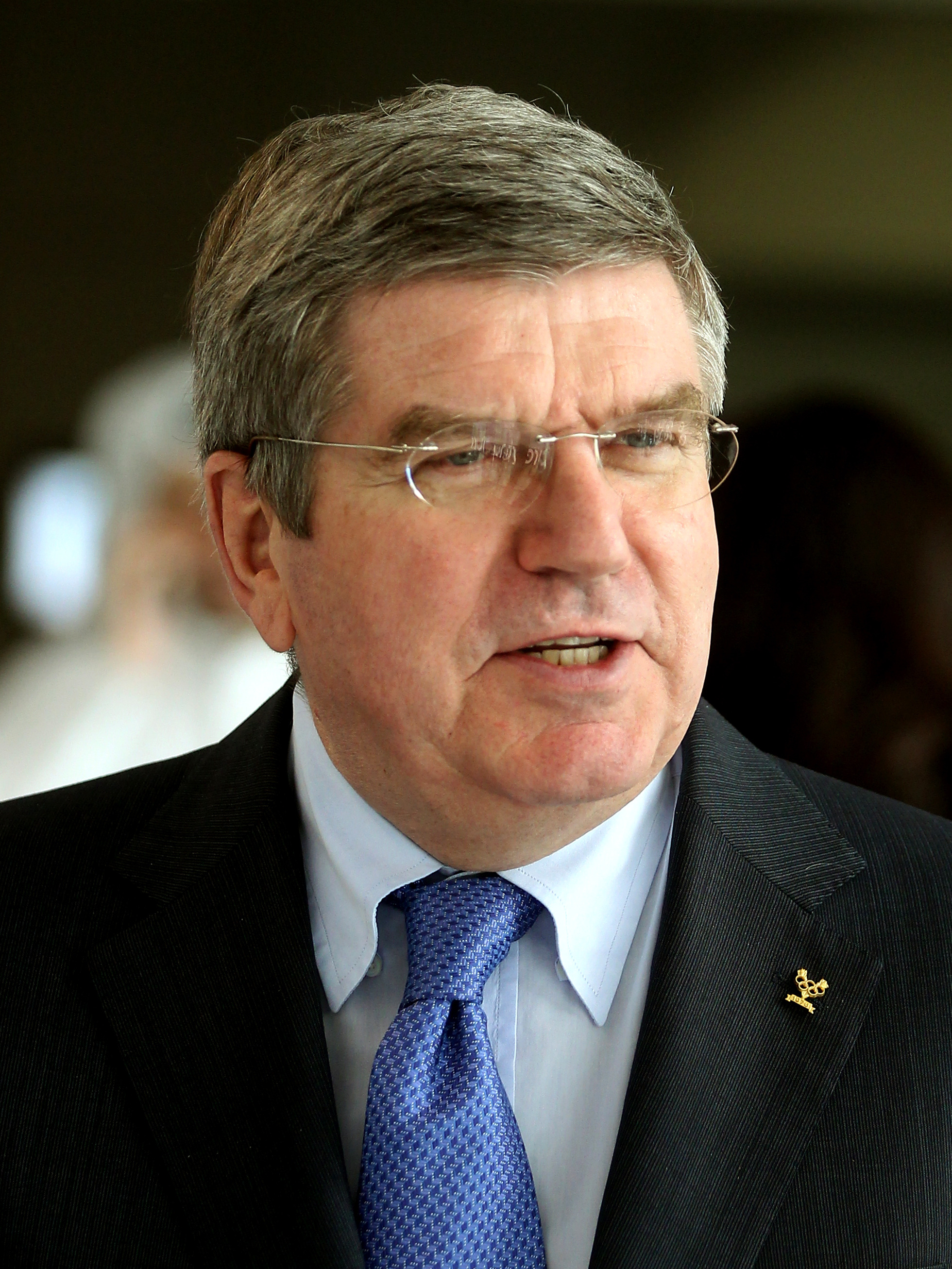
International Olympic Committee
Thomas Bach, President

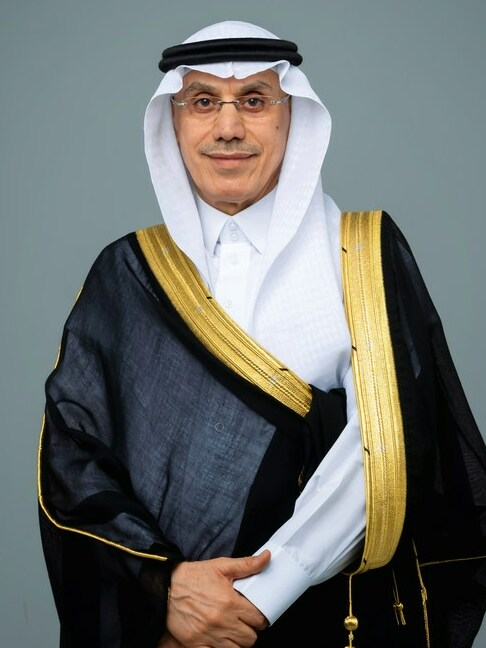
Islamic Development Bank
Muhammed Al-Jasser, President

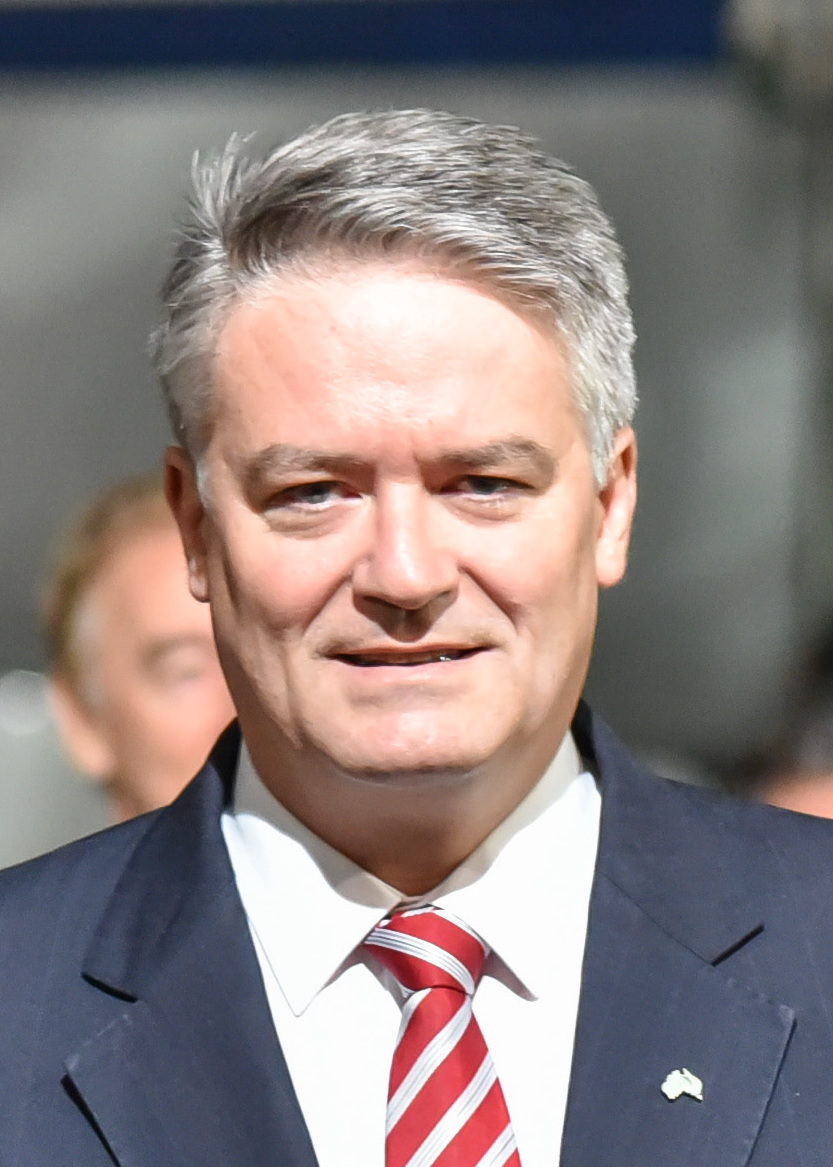
Organisation for Economic Co-operation and Development
Mathias Cormann, Secretary-General

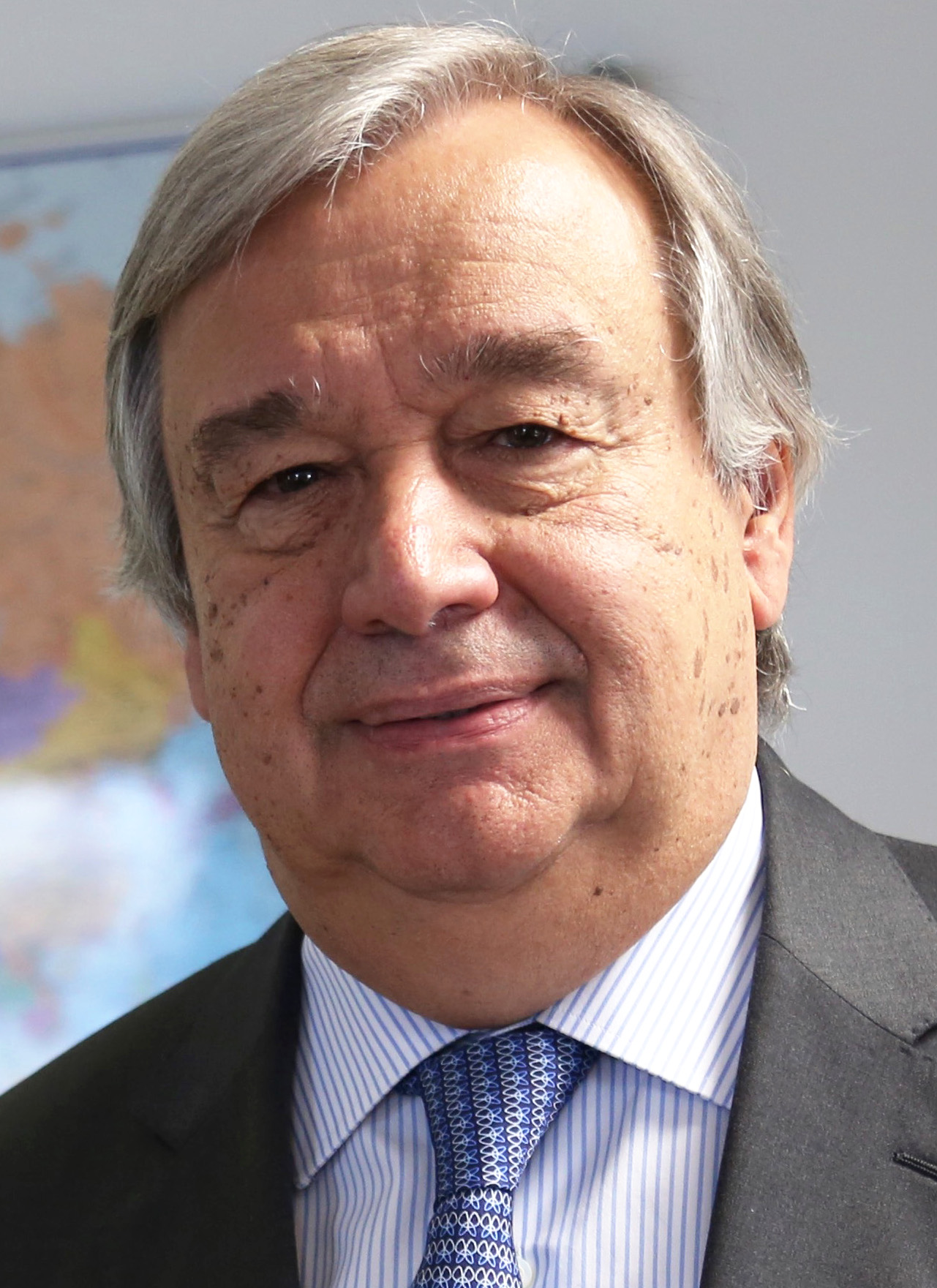
United Nations
António Guterres, Secretary-General

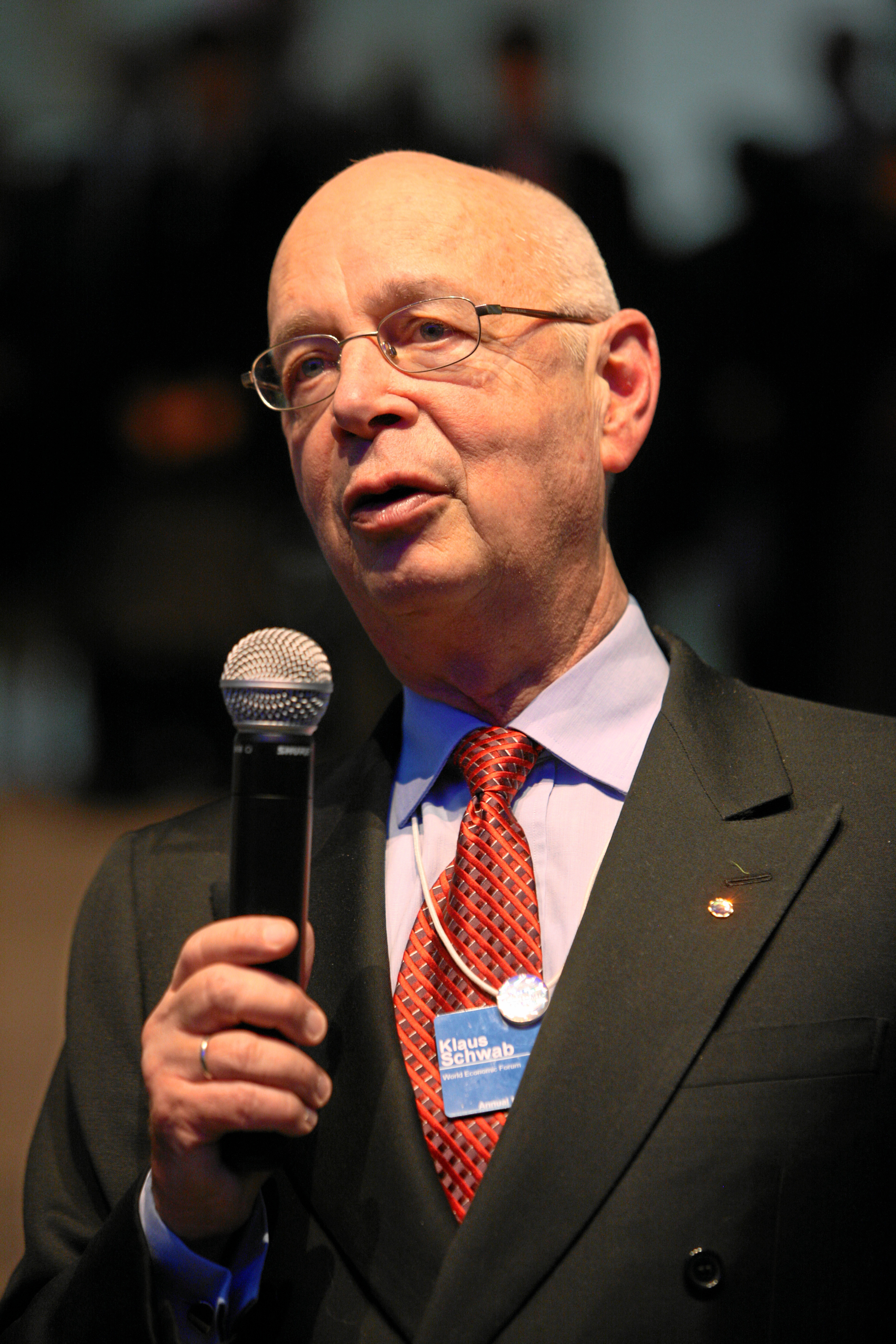
World Economic Forum
Klaus Schwab, Founder & Executive Chairman

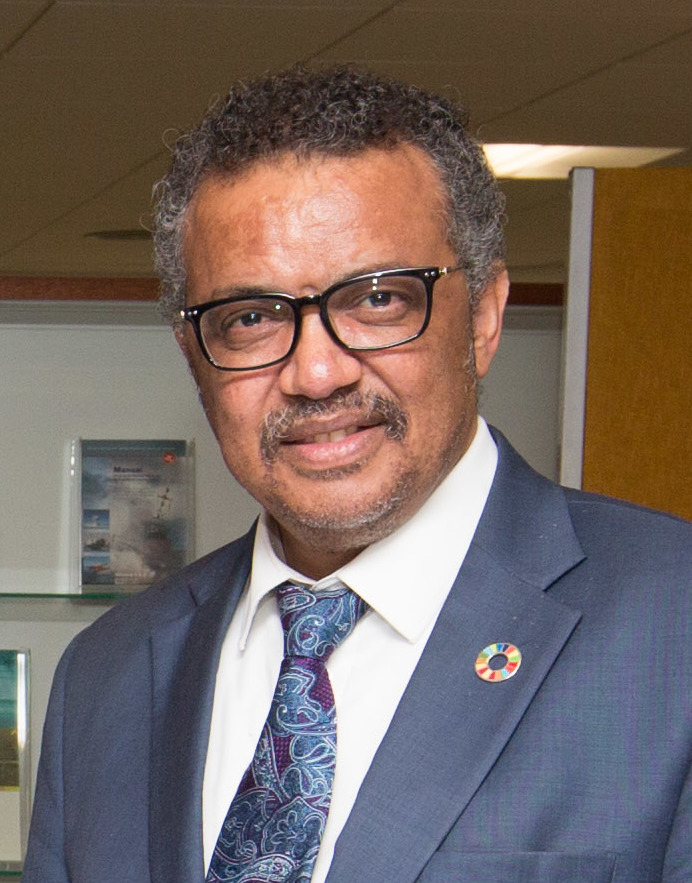
World Health Organization
Tedros Adhanom Ghebreyesus, Director-General

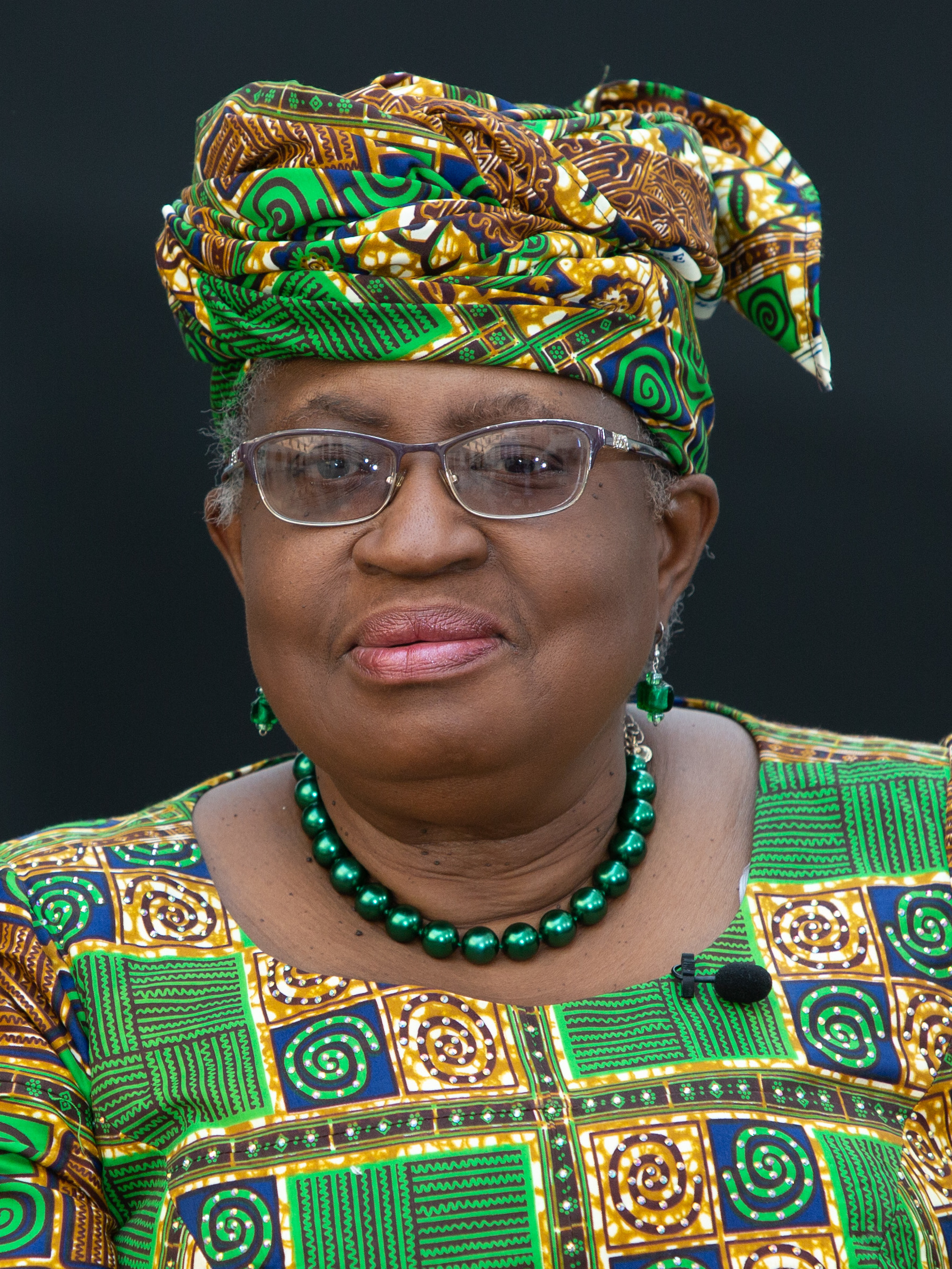
World Trade Organization
Ngozi Okonjo-Iweala, Director-General
