= Komati Power Station =

Power station in South Africa

- Location of Komati Power Station in South Africa
- Country: South Africa
- Location: Mpumalanga
- Coordinates: 26°05′24″S 29°28′19″E
- Status: Decommissioned
- Commission date: 1961; 65 years ago
- Decommission date: 2022; 4 years ago
- Construction cost: 80 million R (1966)
- Owner: Eskom
- Operator: Eskom

Thermal power station
- Primary fuel: Coal

Power generation
- Units operational: 9
- Units planned: 5 × 100 MW; 4 × 125 MW
- Nameplate capacity: 1,000 Megawatt

External links
- Commons: Related media on Commons

Komati Power Station, is a coal-fired power plant operated by Eskom. Its 300-metre-tall (980 ft) chimney was built in 1979, and is one of the tallest structures in the country. Komati is one of power stations with a common steam range, meaning that its nine boilers jointly feed the nine generators. Other stations are Tutuka Power Station and Matimba Power Station.

== History ==
The first unit was commissioned in 1961 and the last in 1966. In 1988, three units at Komati were mothballed, one was kept in reserve and the other five were only operated during peak hours. In 1990, the complete station was mothballed until 2008 when the unit 9 was the first to be recommissioned under Eskom's return-to-service project. The full station was put online in 2011.

It was finally decommissioned on 31 October 2022. The decommissioning was supported by the World Bank as part of the Eskom Just Energy Transition Project, alongside a package of international support for decarbonization in South Africa known as the South Africa Just Energy Transition Investment Plan.

== Power generation ==
The station consists of a total of 9 units having five 100 MW units on the East (1–5) and four 125 MW units on the West (6–9), with a total installed capacity of 1,000 MW. Turbine Maximum Continuous Rating is 30.00%.

== See also ==
- Eskom
- Fossil-fuel power plant
- List of power stations in South Africa
