= Climate governance =

Type of governance

Climate governance is the diplomacy, mechanisms and response measures "aimed at steering social systems towards preventing, mitigating or adapting to the risks posed by climate change". A definitive interpretation is complicated by the wide range of political and social science traditions (including comparative politics, political economy and multilevel governance) that are engaged in conceiving and analysing climate governance at different levels and across different arenas. In academia, climate governance has become the concern of geographers, anthropologists, economists and business studies scholars.

Climate governance – that is, effective management of the global climate system – is thus of vital importance. However, building effective collective mechanisms to govern impacts on the climate system at the planetary level presents particular challenges, e.g. the complexity of the relevant science and the progressive refinement of scientific knowledge about our global climate and planetary systems, and the challenge of communicating this knowledge to the general public and to policy makers. There is also the urgency of addressing this issue; the Intergovernmental Panel on Climate Change (IPCC) has underlined that the international community has a narrow window of opportunity to act to keep global temperature rise at safe levels. Modern international climate governance is organized around three pillars: mitigation, adaptation and means of implementation. Under each pillar are many issues and policies, illustrating the many ways climate change affects society.

In the first decade of the 21st century, a paradox had arisen between rising awareness about the causes and consequences of climate change and an increasing concern that the issues that surround it represent an intractable problem. Initially, climate change was approached as a global issue, and climate governance sought to address it on the international stage. This took the form of Multilateral Environmental Agreements (MEAs), beginning with the United Nations Framework Convention on Climate Change (UNFCCC) in 1992. With the exception of the Kyoto Protocol, international agreements between nations had been largely ineffective in achieving legally binding emissions cuts. With the end of the Kyoto Protocol's first commitment period in 2012, between 2013 and 2015 there was no legally binding global climate regime. This inertia on the international political stage contributed to alternative political narratives that called for more flexible, cost effective and participatory approaches to addressing the multifarious problems of climate change. These narratives relate to the increasing diversity of methods that are being developed and deployed across the field of climate governance.

In 2015, the Paris Agreement was signed, which is a legally binding international treaty on climate change. Its goal is to limit global warming to "well below 2", and preferably 1.5 degrees Celsius above preindustrial levels, and to achieve this goal, countries agree to peak greenhouse gas emissions as soon as possible to achieve a climate-neutral world by mid-century. It commits all nations of the world to achieving a "balance between anthropogenic emissions by sources and removals of greenhouse gases in the second half of this century." The Paris Agreement marked a new era for global energy and climate policies. Under its framework, each country submits its own nationally determined contribution (NDC) based on its particular situation. Though the Paris Agreement is legally binding, as an extension to the UNFCCC, the NDCs are not legally binding. This was because a legally binding treaty would have required ratification by the United States Senate, which was not supportive.

== Background ==
The development of climate governance can be traced firstly to climate diplomacy between inter-state actors and secondly to the development of transnational networks and non-state actors. The timeline above highlights key points throughout this process. The point of creation is difficult to determine exactly, however a definitive point in its history is the 1992 United Nations Framework Convention on Climate Change (UNFCCC) in Rio. This has been termed "the first major milestone in the history of climate diplomacy". The conference addressed nations from across the globe and sought to emulate the diplomatic success of the Montreal Protocol in phasing out ozone-depleting chemicals.

As climate governance has continued to develop on the international stage, a string of transnational public and public-private actor networks have sought to implement its aims within their own arena, for example the C40 Cities Climate Leadership Group, the Global Cities Covenant on Climate (also known as the Mexico City Pact), and the Cities for Climate Protection Programme (CCPP). The United Nations Conference on Environment and Development (UNFCED) in 1992 was a 'trigger' for this process. Existing regional and local networks adopted its emissions reduction targets and began to consider how they could be achieved at a local level. An example is ICLEI – Local Governments for Sustainability that adopted the convention's Framework Convention on Climate Change (UNFCCC) as part of its commitment to link local action to internationally agreed-upon goals. Under the umbrella of internationally agreed climate targets, innovative climate governance methods have also developed that seek to reduce emissions using market based mechanisms, for example the 'cap and trade' mechanism. Other transnational networks include the Powering Past Coal Alliance, aimed at phasing out the use of coal for electricity, and the Under2 Coalition, aimed at fostering action to reduce emissions at the subnational level.

Thus, while the interstate process of treaty making continues to play a key part in mitigating anthropogenic climate change, it now exists as part of a wider tapestry of private and public climate governance initiatives that operate at multiple scales.Effective climate governance directly dictates how these multi-scale adaptation and implementation efforts occur through policy execution, transparent resource allocation, and science-based master plans.

=== North–South divide ===
The North–South divide is a socioeconomic and political division. Applied to climate governance, the divide separates 'developed' northern countries that have historically emitted disproportionately high emissions from 'undeveloped' southern countries that have emitted considerably less emissions. This historic divide is the reason for the concept of Common But Differentiated Responsibilities in the UNFCCC. The divide has also been used to highlight differences in vulnerability to climate change (the global south is considered more vulnerable due to a higher incident of natural disasters, less developed infrastructure and less wealth). These divides have fed into all issues of international climate governance, bringing with them questions of social justice and equity that remain current today. A criticism of the divide is that it simplifies an increasingly complex landscape. In recent years, international trade, free capital flows and the development of some southern nations (for example China and India) have redefined global socio-economic and political relations.

== Actors ==
Climate governance has been identified as multi-scale, multi-actor and deeply embedded in our social and physical infrastructure:

- Multiple scale: Climate governance takes place and has policies enacted across diverse levels and spaces at each scale of governance. This includes supranational, national, regional and local scales. The interaction between these arenas raises important questions about where the power and authority for governing climate change lie. Traditional interpretations of "top down" authority do not necessarily apply in the realm of climate governance which exhibits a far more complex landscape. Local initiatives can be networked horizontally, for example the C40, while some national interests feed back into international agreements.
- Multi actor: The fragmented and blurred roles of state and non-state actors raises ambiguities concerning their relative roles in the realm of climate governance. Non-state actors play critical roles in shaping the positions adopted by national governments in relation to international climate agreements, for example the UNFCCC and the Kyoto Protocol. These actors include scientific, business, lobbyists and community actors. Until the late 1990s, their influence was considered to be "latent", existing outside common governance arenas. More recently, that role has been reassessed as private actors offer new sites and mechanisms that seek to address climate change.
- Embedded: The involvement of non-state actors in climate governance is partly a reflection upon the deeply embedded social and economic nature of many of the processes that lead to Greenhouse Gas (GHG) emissions. The difficulties in addressing climate change are compounded by the complex range of processes that involve GHG emissions across the planet at all scales. Furthermore, decisions reached in other domains, including trade, energy security and employment inevitably impact on the efforts of climate governance to address anthropogenic climate change.

=== Courts ===
Scholars have pointed out that courts play an increasingly influential climate governance role. There are five inter-related domains where the potential influence of courts can be discerned: establishing accountability, redefining power relations, remedying vulnerabilities and injustices, increasing the reach and impact of international climate law and applying climate science to adjudicate legal disputes. Due to their innovative work in these domains courts can become planetary climate governance actors.

For example, courts contribute to climate governance by empowering interested and affected stakeholders and actors; imposing climate change considerations on political agendas; persuading society of the importance of climate action; interpreting and enforcing the growing body of domestic, regional and international climate laws; adjudicating disputes related to climate-induced injustices. Courts thus enable a broad range of stakeholders to use a state's adjudicatory apparatus to resolve climate-related conflicts.

=== Community engagement ===
Community engagement plays an important role in the implementation of climate governance policy. There are two main reasons for this. First, where climate governance necessitates change at a behavioural level, there is a need to educate the public in order to achieve this (for example reducing car travel). Where successful, this offers the possibility that communities can become self governing, for example choosing to drive less. Second, effective community engagement ensures that climate governance policies are relevant to the communities in which they are intended to be applied. This necessitates a process of "bottom up learning", as ideas are passed up from a local to national level. This approach has been identified as the normative framework of "learning organisations" and popular within environmental organisations that seek to encourage grassroots development.

=== Role of science ===
Particular scientific and technical practices shape and inform our understanding of climate change and in doing so define how environmental problems are defined as objects of governance. For example, recent advances in carbon cycle research, remote sensing and carbon accounting techniques have revealed that tropical deforestation accounts for 15% of global carbon dioxide emissions. As a result, it has become a viable concern of climate governance. Previous to its quantification, tropical deforestation had been expressly excluded from the Kyoto Protocol. However, the translation of scientific or policy research findings into governance through the political process remains difficult as science and politics have very different ways of dealing with the issue of uncertainty that is naturally a component of research

=== Market-based ===
The history of climate governance has seen increasing emphasis placed on market based solutions, or "flexibility mechanisms". This is a development that complements, rather than replaces traditional "command and control" regulation. The decision to favour market mechanisms has been identified as inevitable given the growth in popularity of neoliberalism over the past two decades. Thus, targets set at international climate governance conventions have been achieved through the application of markets (for example the EU-ETS), public-private partnerships (for example "type II partnerships") and the self-regulation of industry (for example the Global Gas Flaring Reduction Partnership).

Significantly, the Kyoto Protocol offers participating countries three market based mechanisms as means to meeting their binding emissions reduction targets. These are 'emissions trading' (known as "the carbon market"), 'the clean development mechanism' (CDM) and 'joint implementation' (JI). The three Kyoto market mechanisms have been identified as forms of carbon market governance, a market based form of climate governance. Carbon market governance allows carbon emissions in one place to be exchanged with emissions reductions in another. It relies on measuring, monitoring and verification techniques to commensurate carbon, allowing seemingly disparate activities to appear on the same balance sheet.

The largest working example of carbon market governance to date is the EU-ETS. It is a multinational emissions trading scheme. Advocates of this mechanism cite its focus on improving efficiency, reducing carbon where it is most cost efficient to do so. Its critics identify that it has so far allowed participating industries to profit from excess carbon credits while having little or no effect on their carbon emissions.

The view of climate governance stakeholders that climate action was a costly burden has diminished in recent years: According to the Global Commission on the Economy and Climate, up to 90% of the actions required to get onto a 2 °C pathway would be compatible with the goals of boosting national development, equitable growth and broadly shared improvements in living standards. Three phenomena are behind this cost-benefit analysis: First, "negative cost abatement" means that curbing emissions reduces overall costs (e.g. energy savings). Second, economies of scale and learning-by-doing innovation potentially lead to falling costs over time. Third, so-called "co-benefits" such as health benefits through less air pollution or livelihood security through land restoration can be beneficial for individual countries.

=== Private sector ===
In 2019 the World Economic Forum published its Guiding Principles and Questions to help corporate directors to challenge their boards around climate governance. This was prompted by the Paris Agreement, the emergence of climate-related legislation, the recommendations of the Financial Stability Board's Task Force on Climate-Related Financial Disclosures (TCFD) and, most recently, the heightened awareness of physical impacts and risks detailed in the Special Report on Global Warming of 1.5 °C of the Intergovernmental Panel on Climate Change (IPCC).

== Transnational networks ==
In addition to the efforts of nation-states to coordinate internationally on matters of climate governance, nation-states, non-state actors and private actors are becoming increasingly involved in multiple parallel climate governance partnerships on a global scale. These actors include cities, regions, NGOs and corporations. Their increasingly prominent involvement has led scholars to reassess the nature of power in climate governance as well as the relationship between public and private authority

To distinguish between types of climate governance networks currently in existence, it is useful to separate components into sub-categories. Studies into climate governance have distinguished between modes of governance (self-governing, governing through enabling, governing by provision and governing by authority), types of actors and political scale of governance. For the purpose of this section they are separated according to the type of actors involved – "public climate governance partnerships", "public-private climate governance" partnerships and "private climate governance partnerships". "Modes of governance" and "scale" (e.g. supranational, national, regional, and local) represent equally viable alternatives to this categorisation. While none of these approaches are definitive (each approach exhibits overlaps), defining partnerships according to participating actor is here considered to draw the clearer distinction.

=== Public partnerships ===
- Multilateral Environmental Agreements (MEA's): MEA's can take the form of non-legally binding declarations, or legally binding treaties. Treaties between nations include framework conventions like the Rio Declaration on Environment and Development, signed at the 1992 United Nations Framework Convention on Climate Change (UNFCCC). There are four main criticisms of MEAs. First, their policies have been weakened by successive compromises between bargaining nations. Second, where one nation refuses to participate (as occurred with the United States withdrawal from Kyoto), they can still benefit from measures taken by participating nations (for example measures to reduce their GHG emissions), even though they have not had to take action themselves Third, developing country governments lack the capacity to shape and influence negotiating processes, giving developed countries disproportionate power to influence proceedings. Fourth, the number of countries involved in international meetings inevitably leads to conflicts of interest between nations that can make it difficult to reach legally binding agreements.
- Global city and regional partnerships: Beyond the local scale, the success of urban climate governance depends on horizontal and vertical collaboration between regions and cities. Global city and regional partnerships have been identified as showing particular promise. These can be built into public non-state networks, for example the C40 network, the Global Cities Covenant on Climate, the Cities for Climate Protection Programme (CCPP) and the International Council for Local Environmental Initiatives. The Under2 Coalition aims to foster action among subnational governments. Through these networks, mitigation measures and adaptation strategies can be adopted by participating cities worldwide. A criticism of global city and regional partnerships is that their exclusive nature limits influence to participating cities and regions which risks drawing resources away from less powerful city and regional actors.

=== Public-private partnerships ===
- Type II Partnerships: Type II Partnerships are public-private initiatives between public, private and civic organisations that are the outcome of international treaties. The type II label serves to contrast them against type I partnerships, which are the multilateral agreements that more traditionally arise from international treaties. An example of a Type II partnership is the (approximately) 300 partnerships upon which the World Summit on Sustainable Development in 2002 was based.
- Vertical "supply chain" public-private partnerships: These are partnerships that seek to implement internationally agreed outcomes such as the Millennium Development Goals through supply chain partnerships. This is achieved firstly by facilitating and coordinating interaction between private stakeholders and secondly through constructive engagement between public and private stakeholders regarding the development and delivery of government policies, regulations, programmes and schemes. An example is the Energy Efficiency Partnership for Homes in the UK.
- Targeted phaseout: The Powering Past Coal Alliance is a transnational network aimed to accelerate the coal phase-out around the world. It includes both state and nonstate actors. Similar targeted phaseout networks include the ZEV Alliance and the Global Drive to Zero, which aim to phase out combustion-powered light-duty and heavy-duty vehicles, respectively.

==== Private partnerships ====
- Self regulating private networks: In recent years, transnational corporations have established partnerships through private networks in a variety of schemes that encourage self-regulation of industry. These partnerships are often coordinated by NGOs and funded by government. Existing networks include the Global Gas Flaring Reduction Partnership and the Carbon Disclosure Project. Both of these evidence the importance of NGOs in bringing market actors into the realm of environmental climate governance. Self-regulating private networks have been identified as having the potential to lead to behavioural change that could lead to successful global climate governance. At present however, the networks themselves remain largely unregulated and have been criticised for lacking legitimacy, accountability and transparency.

== Adaptive governance ==
A relatively new approach to governing climate impacts upon social systems is to use the flexible technique of adaptive governance, introduced by Holling in 1978 as opposed to the more mitigation-focused approaches which have generally dominated efforts thus far. Adaptive governance "refers to the ways in which institutional arrangements evolve to satisfy the needs and desires of the community in a changing environment".

Several theorists believe that it is within a society's capacity to adapt to the gradual climate changes we are experiencing currently, and those felt in the future. The role of newly formed institutions would be to formulate policies to strengthen the resilience between complex climate and social systems, and therefore the system's ability to adapt and remain stable in the face of climate changes in the future.

The approach takes a predominantly "bottom up" strategy, focusing on community-based actions.

Adaptive governance has been successfully implemented in a number of local society's around the world in building their ability to adapt to climate change associated impacts such as extreme weather and altering plant biodiversities. Success has mainly been attributed to the fact that through adaptive governance, the social impact is dealt with locally to achieve a more effective result whilst still allowing communication to flow between low to high levels of command.

Several limitations have arisen when applying the adaptive governance strategy to climate governance. For example, the technique could have limited success when adapting to a national or international problem as the system may become too complex. A further weakness highlighted by Ostrom in 2007 is that many adaptive governance systems have been implemented to build resilience to gradual changes but anthropogenic climate change could cause rapid alterations and so challenge the robustness of the whole governance system.

== See also ==
- Carbon governance in England – Emissions, effects, and responses of the United Kingdom related to climate change
- Climate change litigation – Use of legal practice to further climate change mitigation
- Earth system governance – Field of scholarly inquiry in the social sciences
- Politics of climate change – Interaction of societies and governments with current climate change
- Territorialisation of carbon governance – Concept used in climate governance
