= Territorialisation of carbon governance =

Concept used in climate governance

Territorialisation of Carbon Governance (ToCG) is a concept used in political geography or environmental policy which is considered to be a new logic of environmental governance. This method creates carbon-relevant citizens who become enrolled in the process of governing the climate. The territorialisation of carbon governance transforms climate change from a global to local issue. It embodies political practices that serve to connect the causes and consequences of global climate change to local communities.

The commitment to reducing greenhouse gas emissions (GHG) has been a key component of sustainability within governance since the early 1990s. The ICLEI - Local Governments for Sustainability is an international association of local governments which brings together 1200 cities, towns and the associated 70 countries in their commitment to sustainable development. Further responses that seek to address these issues, include international body the IPCC Intergovernmental Panel on Climate Change, the Rio Earth Summit and United Nations Framework Convention on Climate Change (UNFCCC). These organisations strive to tackle anthropogenic forces which are increasing risks of global warming.

Under the territorialisation of carbon, climate and global flows of carbon are regarded as 'national sinks'. This is a means by which the carbon cycle can be managed and territorialised through being assigned to a physical geographical space instead of being thought of as a global phenomenon. The act of territorialisation oversees the combining of material natures and state institutions into one system through the creation of carbon territories. This approach can allow individual states and governments to control and monitor their carbon emissions in order to improve their efforts in carbon governance.

Carbon governance can be interpreted as the institutional arrangements under which greenhouse gas emissions are addressed and mitigated. This is achieved through regulating and controlling carbon activities. Measures and protocols exist in an attempt to address the issues surrounding greenhouse gas emissions. Carbon governance is addressed via governmental decisions made through leadership and management which attempt to improve and resolve problems related to climate change.

== Background and history ==
ToCG finds its origin in the problem of global climate change. Climate change is often referred to as a global 'commons' problem whereby individuals are unlikely to take responsibility for the global accumulation of greenhouse gases. The atmosphere is shared by everybody resulting in the impacts of climate change and emissions being felt everywhere irrelevant of their origin. The implications of this problem are that to slow down global warming, 'top-down' international treaties must be signed. This idea can be related to the 'Tragedy of the Commons' since the world contains multiple nation-states all acting with self-interest yet sharing one resource. The shared resource being exploited in this example can be represented by the atmosphere and the subsequent increase in global temperature is the result.

In an attempt to combat and tackle these issues protocols and measures have been deployed. The 1997 Kyoto Protocol is an international agreement which sets binding targets in reducing GHG emissions. This treaty demonstrates a global approach to carbon governance. While this is legally binding to participating nation states it is due to expire in 2012. However the United States, the world's most historical emitter of GHG emissions, pulled out of the Kyoto Protocol. The Copenhagen Accord, which will come into effect in 2012 after the expiration of the Kyoto Protocol, was unsuccessful in creating a legally binding framework of global emissions reduction. These problems demonstrate how global approaches and agreements between nation states can demonstrate failure.

The territorialisation of carbon governance is a method which has arisen in an attempt to overcome this problem though framing global problems as local and is considered a "bottom-up approach" to making change. 'Think globally, act locally' is an idea which can be interpreted spatially and conceptually. Instead of approaching the problems from a global scale, local governments are asserting themselves as active institutions in the making of climate policy. In doing so they are taking responsibility for the accumulation of greenhouse gases within their area. This contradicts the global "commons" theory whereby individuals are unable to take on global issues. The territorialisation of carbon governance uses scale and space in order to establish carbon territories. These can be used to establish and identify connections between carbon emissions and a geographical area.

== Role of scale and space ==
The concept of territorialisation of carbon governance is a method which reverses how environmental policy regulates global climate from a top down to bottom up approach. This technique tackles issues on a local scale rather than taking a global approach. Territorialisation of carbon governance encompasses ideas of scale and space. Methods by which environmental issues are addressed operate at a number of different levels. These include local, regional, national and international. The scale at which territorialisation of carbon governance operates is local. The idea of 'space' can be used to link nature with a state in order to designate 'carbon territories'.

Territorialisation of nature uses "legible and bounded space" to define the regulation and administration of state policies related to the environment. With the support of modern technologies for controlling, modeling and measuring atmosphere-biosphere interactions, the 'invisible' process of climate change, in recent years, has been "moulded onto territorial ground".

Territoriality can be understood as a form of behavior that "binds, refines and controls space for some social end". Within this, 'rule over space' can be defined as a particularly important form of contemporary political authority. It seeks to govern issues related to climate change. In this regard establishing boundaries can be used to "border" climate change between states. This allows individual states to set specific emission reduction targets and manage carbon sinks alongside their environmental policies.

== Governance beyond the state ==
=== A shift in governance ===
In recent decades a notable shift in government has been observedd. The shift from government to governance is a new concept whereby conventional direct governmental action has been replaced by a more complex system. This newer complex system includes policy making and implementation by a new set of actors. The shift from government to governance depicts the new range of actors, sites and methods engaged to tackle certain issues.

These characteristic shifts in government can be seen in how specific environmental issues are addressed and mitigated also. The former 'command and control' model, which dictated regulations and regimented practices could no longer function effectively within the present environmental governance network. The complex nature of the environment, actors and institutions called for a more fluid mode of governing, one which attempts to 'steer' and guide.

This new method gave rise to more appropriate and effective conditions for collective action between stakeholders which can work together to achieve common goals and mitigate environmental problems. This has resulted in the duties of government no longer being centralised within the state but being shared with other parts of society such as non-governmental organisations (NGOs), cities and regional and local authorities. These range of actors and sites involved in environmental governance demonstrate a growing diversity. A states traditional sovereign decision-making authority has become shared, in recent years, with such actors giving rise to new methods and strategies. ToCG is an example of one of these methods in place to address and tackle issues in environmental governance.

Furthermore, many environmental issues are considered as problems which go beyond the capacities of individual state institutions. This has led to government programs demanding investigations into the relationship between state territories and material natures. Territorialisation of carbon can allow the connection of material natures to state territories which can permit an improved governance of carbon.

Sub-national state spaces are examples of bodies which fall below the level of state. These bodies can be effective in tackling climate change and reducing the effects of global warming. Cities are an example of a sub-national space and can demonstrate specific strategies which can help address and mitigate problems in climate change governance. The 1987 Brundtland Report drew particular attention to the significance of cities as a means through which issues surrounding sustainable development could be addressed. The power of cities to organise and initiate specific strategies within carbon governance has been underestimated yet displays enormous potential.

=== Territorialisation and governance ===
Policy making and environmental regulation has shown specific cases of progress and success through the territorialisation of carbon governance. This is made possible when direct causes and consequences of global climate change have been connected to a specific geographical space. The United States is an example of a country whereby regions, states and cities have acted beyond the federal government and taken the matter of climate change into their own hands. This illustrates examples of multi-level governance whereby a shifting in action between local, national and supranational governmental institutions has taken place. This displays an entire new range of actors and institutions which provide order and help govern the environment. Territorialisation of carbon is means by which a city can assert its authority as a coherent space in which to tackle climate change.

== Territorialisation of carbon governance in Seattle ==
In order to territorialise carbon, geographical areas are created whereby emissions are monitored and environmental policy can set targets of reduction. Within these geographical areas climatic regulations can be implemented. Seattle is an example of a city where local governments are asserting themselves as active institutions in the development and creation of climate policy. This goes against neoliberal reforms and the favoured market-led environmental regulations which endorse the expansion of the market economy in providing ways to regulate environmental problems. The boundaries of nature and ecosystems are unclear and hard to map. This can be further extended to the characteristics of the atmospheric carbon cycle which is also hard to impose and enforce boundaries on. Understanding and gaining a sense of space and boundary is essential in the territorialisation of carbon. Only then is it possible to govern carbon and the flows of inputs and outputs within a country or state. Although the physical greenhouse gas molecules are part of the shared global atmosphere, sections of them have been assigned to Seattle's jurisdiction. This is achieved through the territorialisation of carbon whereby the greenhouse gases are spatially referenced to transportation, energy production and consumption and other greenhouse gas activities that occur within the city of Seattle.

Through attributing sections of the carbon cycle to specific carbon emitting activities enables a state to become responsible for the individual flows of carbon within their geographical area. This can allow the governance of carbon and the environment to be better executed in specific locations. The chemical make up of greenhouse gas emissions make them invisible to the human eye and hard to actively measure and observe. The city of Seattle has overcome this problem through creating new strategies which can enable the inclusion of these gases into their jurisdictional territory. Instead of defining these gases as 'inside' or 'outside' the territory, which would not be feasible, the gases are accounted for by specific places and activities that operate and fall within the geographical space of Seattle.

The territorialisation of carbon governance has empowered actors and institutions within areas such as Seattle. This provides the city and actors within the city to reassert their ability to regulate infrastructural aspects which are related to carbon governance.

Certain practices, such as transport, pollution and urban development can be better monitored, regulated and managed through the territorialisation of carbon governance. Although there are several greenhouse gases which contribute to global warming, carbon represents the key relation between the state and nature (Rice, 2010). It is through carbon that climate and climate change can be made relevant and connected to practices within a specific geographical area, such as a state. This territorial 'carbon breakdown' or territorialisation of carbon governance is what provides states with the political power to address climate issues within their jurisdiction. This is an example of how Seattle has been able use climate as a 'conceptual resource' in order to make urban climate more governable. Through territorialising carbon governance in Seattle many initiatives and regulations have been introduced to reduce the greenhouse gas emission levels. The point at which Seattle established itself as its own 'carbon territory' an array of strategies have been developed and put into practice. The strategies have been implemented and demonstrate success in reducing the effects of climate change.

In order for this to be made possible the city had to engage and motivate local residents. The Seattle Climate Action Now (SCAN) program has been developed to educate and inspire the local population to become actively involved in reducing carbon emissions. All of these efforts and programs are based on the ability of the city of Seattle to regulate climate through the territorialisation of carbon. This new method of climate governance has achieved an 11 percent reduction in per capita greenhouse gas emissions for 2005 compared to 1999. This concept has broken down the idea of climate change as being a global problem to more of a local issue that can be tackled and addressed by local communities.

== See also ==
- Carbon credit
- Carbon negative
- Carbon neutral
- Carbon retirement
- Carbon tax
- Ecosystem Marketplace
- Live Earth Pledge
- Mitigation of global warming
- Plantations and natural forest loss
- Renewable Energy Certificates
- Weighted average cost of carbon
- Zero carbon
