= Glasgow Climate Pact =

International agreement

- Drafted: 31 October – 13 November 2021
- Signed: 13 November 2021
- Location: Glasgow, Scotland
- Parties: 197
- Depositary: Secretary-General of the United Nations
- Languages: English

Full text
- Glasgow Climate Pact at Wikisource

Edit

The Glasgow Climate Pact is an agreement reached at the 2021 United Nations Climate Change Conference (COP26). The pact is the first climate agreement explicitly planning to reduce unabated coal usage. A pledge to "phase out" coal was changed to "phase down" late in negotiation, for coal in India and coal in China and other coal reliant countries.

== Development ==
The pact's main elements were:

- An agreement to re-visit emission reduction plans in 2022 in order to try to keep the 1.5 °C Paris Agreement target achievable
- The first ever inclusion of a commitment to limit ("phase down") the use of unabated coal (from this wording it implicitly follows that utilising coal with "abatement" (net-zero emission), e.g. by neutralising the resulting carbon dioxide via the CO_{2}-to-stone process, need not be reduced. However this carbon capture and storage is too expensive for most coal fired power stations.)
- A commitment to climate finance for developing countries.

== Pledges ==
The number of countries pledged to reach net-zero emissions passed 140. This target includes 90% of current global greenhouse gas emissions.

More than 100 countries, including Brazil, pledged to reverse deforestation by 2030.

More than 40 countries pledged to move away from coal.

India promised to draw half of its energy requirement from renewable sources by 2030.

The governments of 24 developed countries and a group of major car manufacturers including GM, Ford, Volvo, BYD Auto, Jaguar Land Rover and Mercedes-Benz committed to "work towards all sales of new cars and vans being zero emission globally by 2040, and by no later than 2035 in leading markets". Major car manufacturing nations like the US, Germany, China, Japan and South Korea, as well as Volkswagen, Toyota, Peugeot, Honda, Nissan and Hyundai, did not pledge.

== Reception ==
UN climate chief Patricia Espinosa stated that she was not happy with the last minute change of language affirmed by members of the Indian and Chinese parties but did say that, "No deal was the worst possible result there. Nobody wins,” stating she was satisfied with the deal overall. “We would have preferred a very clear statement about a phasing out of coal and (the) elimination of fossil fuel subsidies,” Espinosa said, but explained she understands India’s needs.
