= Carbon Retirement =

Carbon Retirement Ltd is a social enterprise which provides carbon offsetting services by the method of carbon retirement. The company sells offset credits which are approved by the UK Government's Quality Assurance Scheme for Carbon Offsetting.

== Corporate background ==
Carbon Retirement Ltd was founded, in 2008, by Jane Burston and Dan Lewer. The company is based in Battersea, London, UK. The organisation publishes research and commentary on matters relating to carbon markets and climate change policy. Research reports have covered the use of voluntary carbon offsetting by FTSE 100 companies, the effectiveness of the Carbon Reduction Commitment, profits derived from auctions of EU Emissions Allowances, and alleged inefficiencies in the Clean Development Mechanism.
