= Coal phase-out =

Environmental policy intended to stop using coal

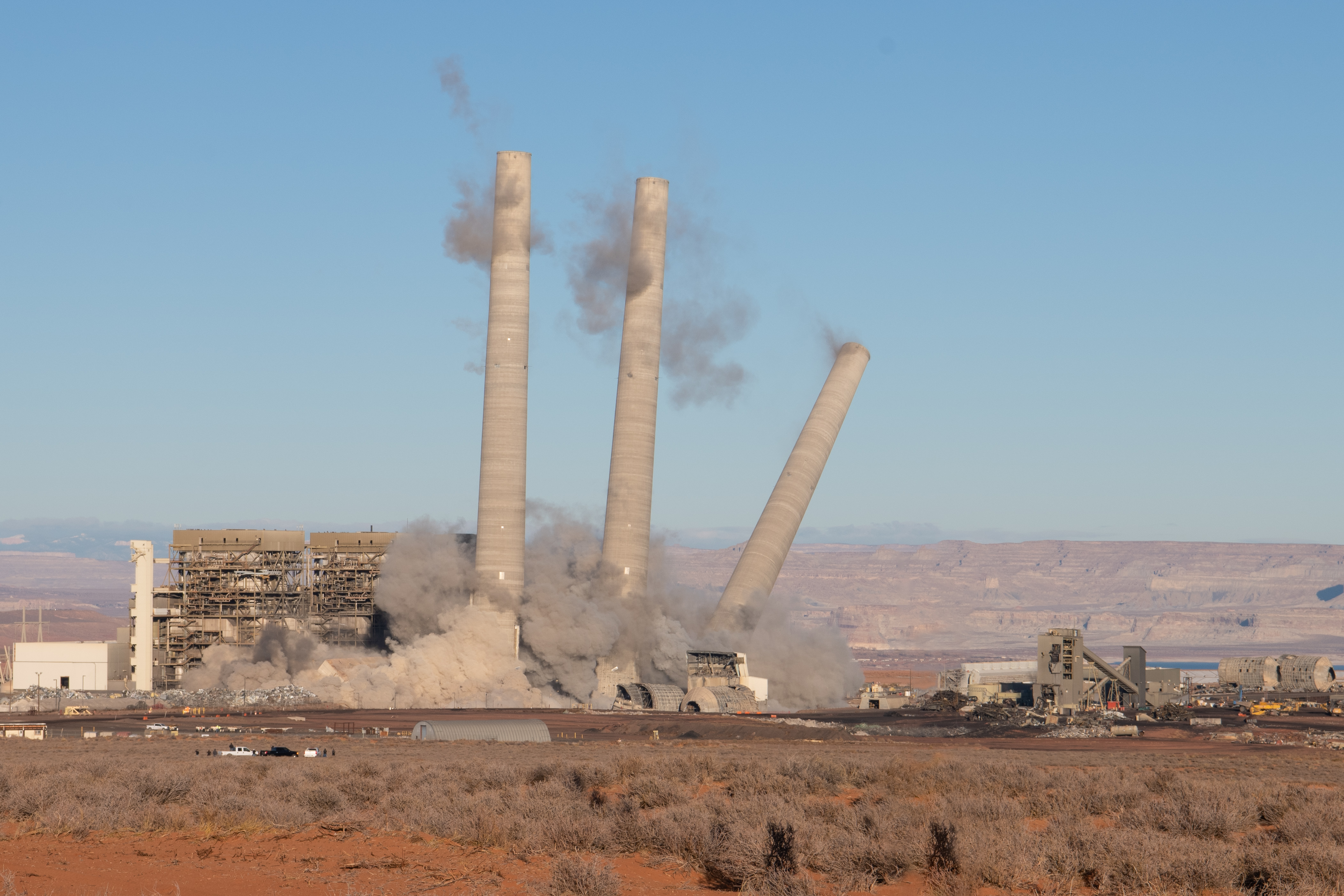
Demolition of Navajo Generating Station smokestacks in 2020

The annual amount of coal plant capacity being retired increased into the mid-2010s. However, the rate of retirement has since stalled, and global coal phase-out is not yet compatible with the goals of the Paris Climate Agreement.

In parallel with retirement of some coal plant capacity, other coal plants are still being added, though the annual amount of added capacity has been declining since the 2010s.

Coal phase-out is stopping burning coal in coal-fired power plants and elsewhere. This environmental policy is part of fossil fuel phase-out. The health and environmental benefits of coal phase-out, such as limiting respiratory diseases and biodiversity loss, are greater than the cost. Coal is the most carbon-intensive fossil fuel, therefore phasing it out is critical to limiting climate change as laid out in the Paris Agreement. The International Energy Agency (IEA) estimates that coal is responsible for over 30% of the global average temperature increase above pre-industrial levels. Some countries in the Powering Past Coal Alliance have already stopped.

China and India burn a lot of coal. But the only significant funding for new plants is for coal power in China. Developed countries may part finance the phase out for developing countries through the Just Energy Transition Partnership, provided they do not build any more coal plants. It has been estimated that coal phase-out could benefit society by over 1% of GDP each year to the end of the 21st century, so economists have suggested a Coasean bargain in which already developed countries help finance the coal phase-out of still developing countries. Meeting the IEA's 1.5°C pathway for coal would require closing around 70% of existing coal-fired capacity early, rather than retiring plants at the end of their operating lives.

The health and environmental benefits of getting rid of coal quickly exceed the costs, but some countries still favor coal, and there is much disagreement about how quickly it should be phased out. However many countries, such as the Powering Past Coal Alliance, have already or are transitioned away from coal; the largest transition announced so far being Germany, which is due to shut down its last coal-fired power station between 2035 and 2038. Germany is using reverse auctions to compensate coal-fired power plants for shutting down ahead of schedule. Some countries are making a just transition and pensioning off coal miners early. However, low-lying Pacific Islands are concerned the transition is not fast enough and that they will be inundated by sea level rise, so they have called for OECD countries to completely phase out coal by 2030 and other countries by 2040. Phasing down coal was agreed at the 2021 United Nations Climate Change Conference in the Glasgow Climate Pact. Vietnam is among few coal-dependent developing countries that pledged to phase out unabated coal power by the 2040s or as early as possible thereafter

In 2022–2023 coal use rose. The IEA pointed out high gas prices due to the Russian invasion of Ukraine and extreme weather events as contributors to the increase. The G7 countries have agreed to close all coal power plants by 2030–2035 unless their greenhouse gases are captured.

== Peak coal ==
World map which shows which countries made zero-coal pledges, and the year by which they aim to achieve this

Peak coal is the moment of maximum consumption of coal, after which it is assumed that coal consumption would decrease. Historically, it was widely believed that the supply-side would eventually drive peak coal due to the depletion of coal reserves. However, since the increasing global efforts to limit climate change, peak coal has been driven by demand. This is due in large part to the rapid expansion of natural gas and renewable energy. As of 2024 over 40% of all energy sector carbon dioxide emissions are from coal, and many countries have pledged to phase-out coal.

The peak of coal's share in the global energy mix was in 2008, when coal accounted for 30% of global energy production. Coal consumption is declining in the United States and Europe, as well as developed economies in Asia. However production increased in India, Indonesia and China, which offset the falls in other regions.

In 2024 the International Energy Agency said: “While coal demand in advanced economies continues to shrink, this decline is expected to be offset by growth in a few emerging and developing economies, such as India, Indonesia and Viet Nam, where the additional energy demand associated with economic growth is set to be met with a variety of sources, including coal. Despite increasing renewable electricity generation, India is expected to see the largest increase in coal use in the coming years, driven by consumption from the power sector and industry. Still, as has been the case for 25 years, China, which consumes 30% more coal than the rest of the world put together, will continue to define global trends.”

== Switch to cleaner fuels and lower carbon electricity generation ==
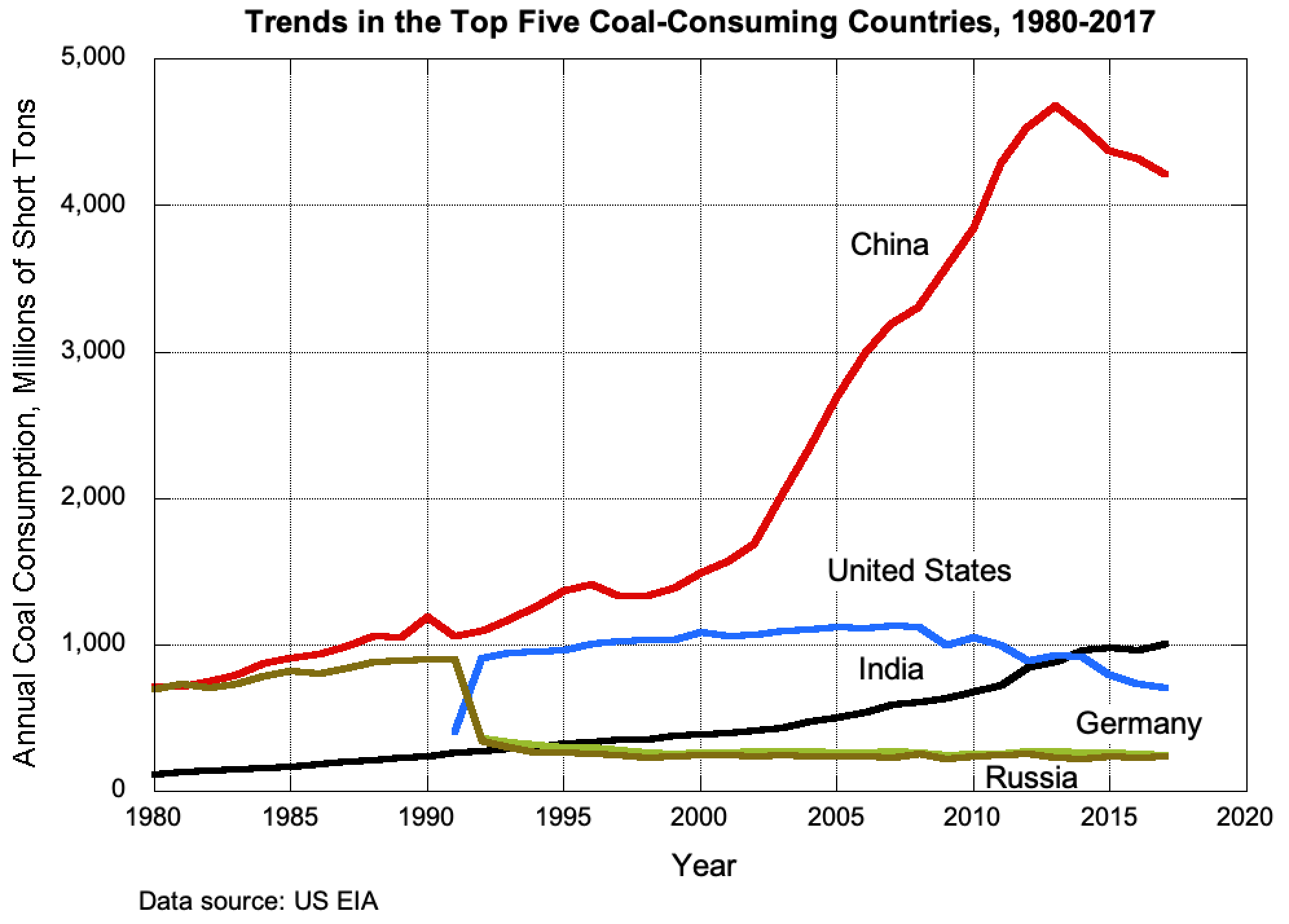
Top five coal consuming countries to 2017, US EIA data

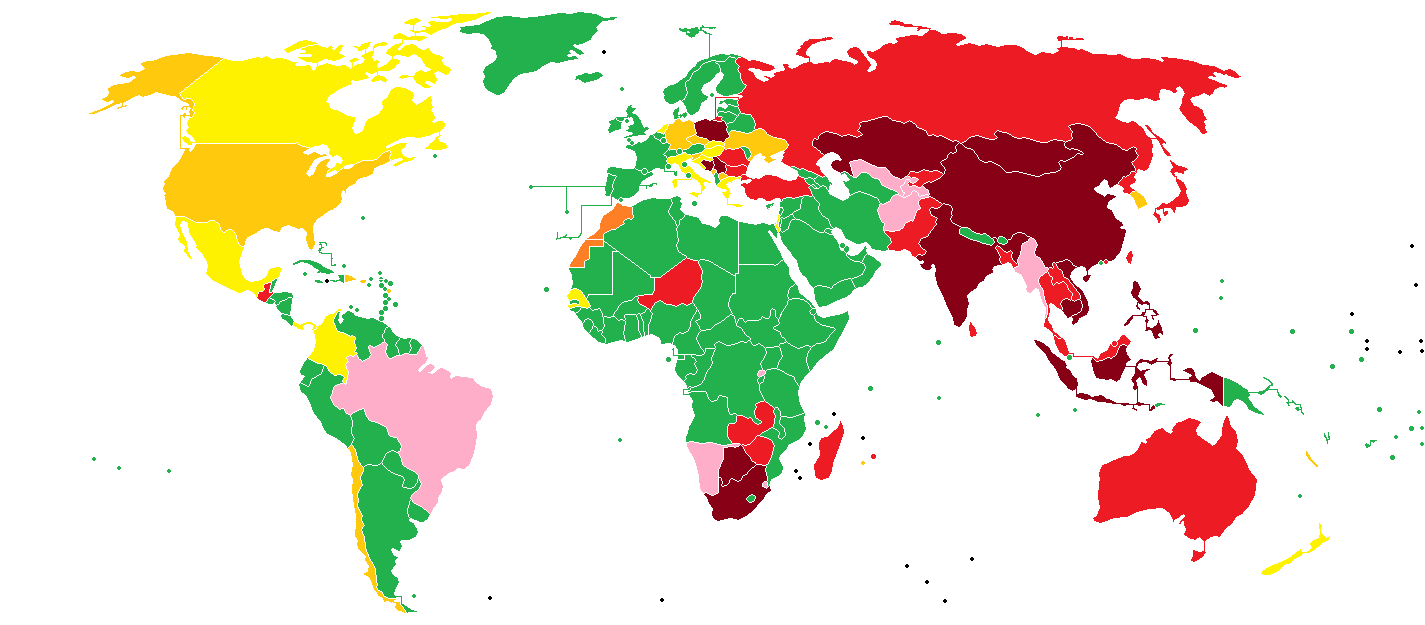
Coal use for power by country and territory in 2024–25. Powering Past Coal Alliance (PPCA) membership also indicated. _ Coal >50% of grid electricity _ Coal 10–50% of grid electricity _ Coal <10% of grid electricity _ Coal <1% of grid electricity _ Coal >50% of grid electricity (PPCA member) _ Coal 10–50% of grid electricity (PPCA member) _ Coal <10% of grid electricity (PPCA member) _ No data

Coal-fired generation puts out about twice as much carbon dioxide—around a tonne for every megawatt hour generated—as electricity generated by burning natural gas at 500 kg of greenhouse gas per megawatt hour. In addition to generating electricity, natural gas is also popular in some countries for heating. One major intergovernmental organisation (the G7) committed in 2021 to end support for coal-fired power stations within the year.

The use of coal in the United Kingdom declined as a result of the development of North Sea oil and the subsequent Dash for Gas during the 1990s. In Canada some coal power plants, such as the Hearn Generating Station, switched from coal to natural gas. In 2022, coal power in the United States provided less than a fifth of its electricity, down from almost half in 2008, due to the plentiful supplies of low cost natural gas obtained by hydraulic fracturing of tight shale formations.

== Coal phase-out by country ==
Country	Phase-out year	Notes
Australia	not yet committed	
Austria	2020	
Belgium	2016	After the government denied a 2009 application to build a new power plant in Antwerp, the Langerlo power station burned its last ton of coal in March 2016.
Bulgaria	2038	Closure is planned for 2038 but it is thought market forces will force it well before that.
Canada	2030	
Chile	2030	
Colombia	not yet committed	
Czech Republic	2033	
Denmark	2028	
Finland	2025	The last major coal plant retired in 2025, and Finland announced its coal phase-out. However, two biomass and coal plants, Vaskiluoto 2 and Martinlaakso 2, still use up to 30% coal as fuel. Martinlaakso 2 is expected to stop burning coal in 2026.
France	2027	
Germany	2038	
Greece	2028	
Hungary	2029	
Iceland	1950	
Ireland	2025	
Israel	2027	
Italy	2038	Italy phased out coal in 2025 with the exception of Sardinia Island. Sardinia is expected to phase-out coal in 2038.
Japan	not yet committed	
Latvia	2010	
Luxembourg	1998	
Mexico	not yet committed	
Morocco	2040	
Netherlands	2029	
New Zealand	2030	
Norway	2023	
Poland	2049	
Portugal	2021	
Slovakia	2024	
Slovenia	2033	
South Korea	2040	
Spain	2030	In 2025, the last coal power station on the Spanish mainland ceased operation. The last remaining operational power station is Es Murterar near Alcúdia on the island of Mallorca.
Sweden	2020	
Switzerland	1961	
Turkey	not yet committed	
United Kingdom	2024	
United States	2035	

To meet global climate goals and provide power to those that do not currently have it coal power must be reduced from nearly 10,000 TWh to less than 2,000 TWh by 2040.

=== Africa ===
==== South Africa ====
The country is attempting a just transition away from coal in South Africa. Three coal power plants are due to be decommissioned in 2030. Academics said in 2024 that workers in the south-west part of Mpumalanga need new jobs.

=== Americas ===
==== Canada ====
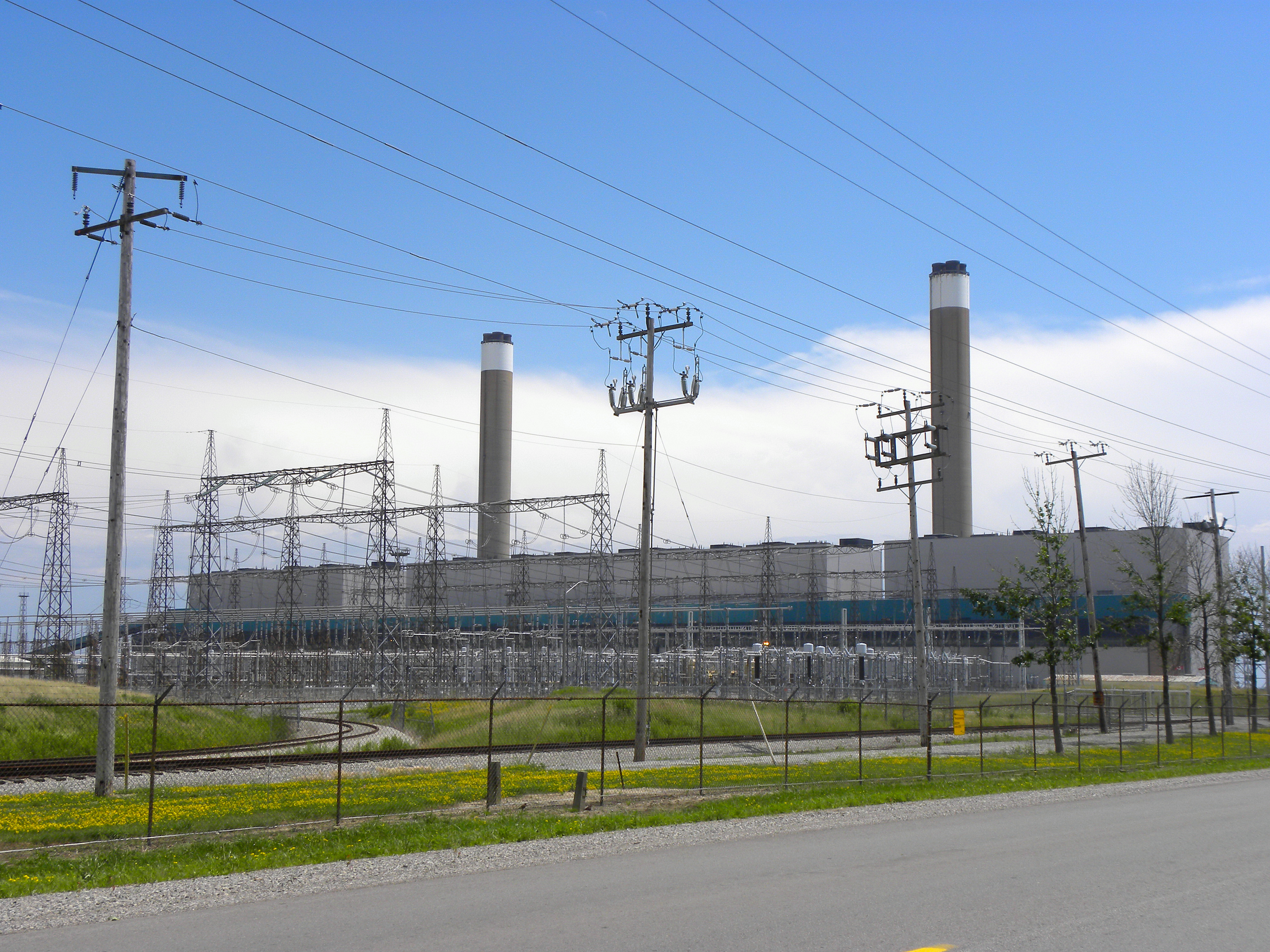
The Nanticoke Generating Station in Ontario, one of the largest power plants to be shut as part of Ontario's coal phaseout

In 2014, Ontario was the first jurisdiction in North America to eliminate coal in electricity generation. The process of phasing out coal-fired power began in 2003. At that time, Ontario had a power plant capacity of 7,500 megawatts on the grid, which corresponded to a quarter of its total capacity. In 2016, the Government of Canada announced plans to phase out coal-fired electricity generation by 2030. Alberta followed up in 2024 with phasing out its last coal power plant in Genesee. As of 2024, only three provinces burned coal to generate electricity: Nova Scotia, New Brunswick, and Saskatchewan. Canada aims to generate 90% of its electricity from non-emitting sources by 2030. Ontario's electricity supply is now based primarily on nuclear energy (approx. 54%) and hydropower (approx. 26%).

==== United States ====
In the USA, coal-fired power generation causes external costs of around $350 billion per year. The health damage resulting from coal-fired power generation is estimated to be 0.8 to 5.6 times the total economic benefit to the United States.

The Obama administration developed regulatory measures aimed at reducing CO2 emissions from coal combustion by 30 per cent overall by 2030, compared with 2005 levels. This would have meant the closure of hundreds of coal-fired power plants and the rapid expansion of gas-fired power plants, wind farms and solar power plants.

Coal generated about 19.5% of the electricity at utility-scale facilities in the United States in 2022, down from 38.6% in 2014 and 51% in 2001. In 2021, coal supplied 9.5 quadrillion British thermal units (2,800 TWh) of primary energy to electric power plants, which made up 90% of coal's contribution to U.S. energy supply.

A new 1.25 GW coal fired power station has been proposed for Alaska, the project kicked off in 2026.

=== Asia ===
There is a plan to buy up coal-fired power plants in Asia in a cooperation between the private sector and development banks. Risk mitigation measures are supposed to make lower margins acceptable for investors. This will allow the capital costs to be recouped in a shorter period and the power plants to be shut down more quickly.

==== China ====
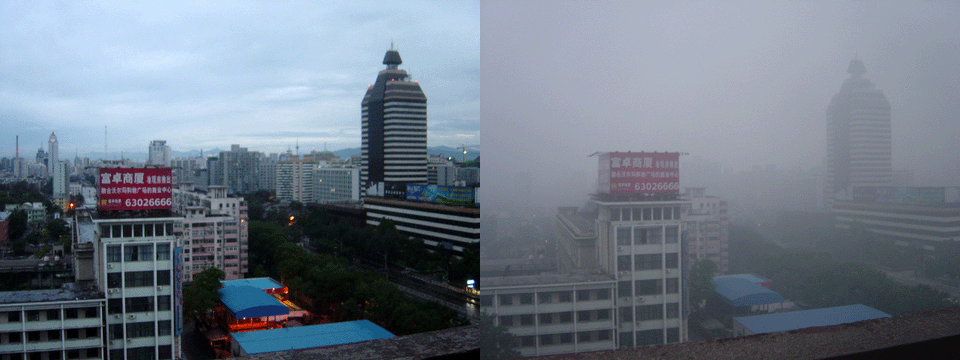
The smog in China's major cities, caused in part by emissions from coal-fired power plants, is a serious environmental and health problem, as shown here in Beijing on two different days in August 2005.

Coal is China's most important source of energy. In 2015, it accounted for 64.4% of China's total energy consumption, although this share has been declining for years as coal consumption has been growing less rapidly than that of other energy sources. In the electricity sector, coal still accounted for 83% in 2007, but by 2015, this share had fallen to 72% with the growing share of renewable energies and nuclear energy. In 2013, coal consumption in China also peaked in absolute terms (other statistics cite 2014), after which consumption fell (by 2.9% in 2014 and 3.6% in 2015). Since this decline in coal consumption was achieved despite economic growth of 7.3% and 6.9%, respectively, thereby decoupling growth from coal consumption, some researchers regard this decline as a permanent trend reversal in Chinese energy policy and an important step in global climate protection efforts.

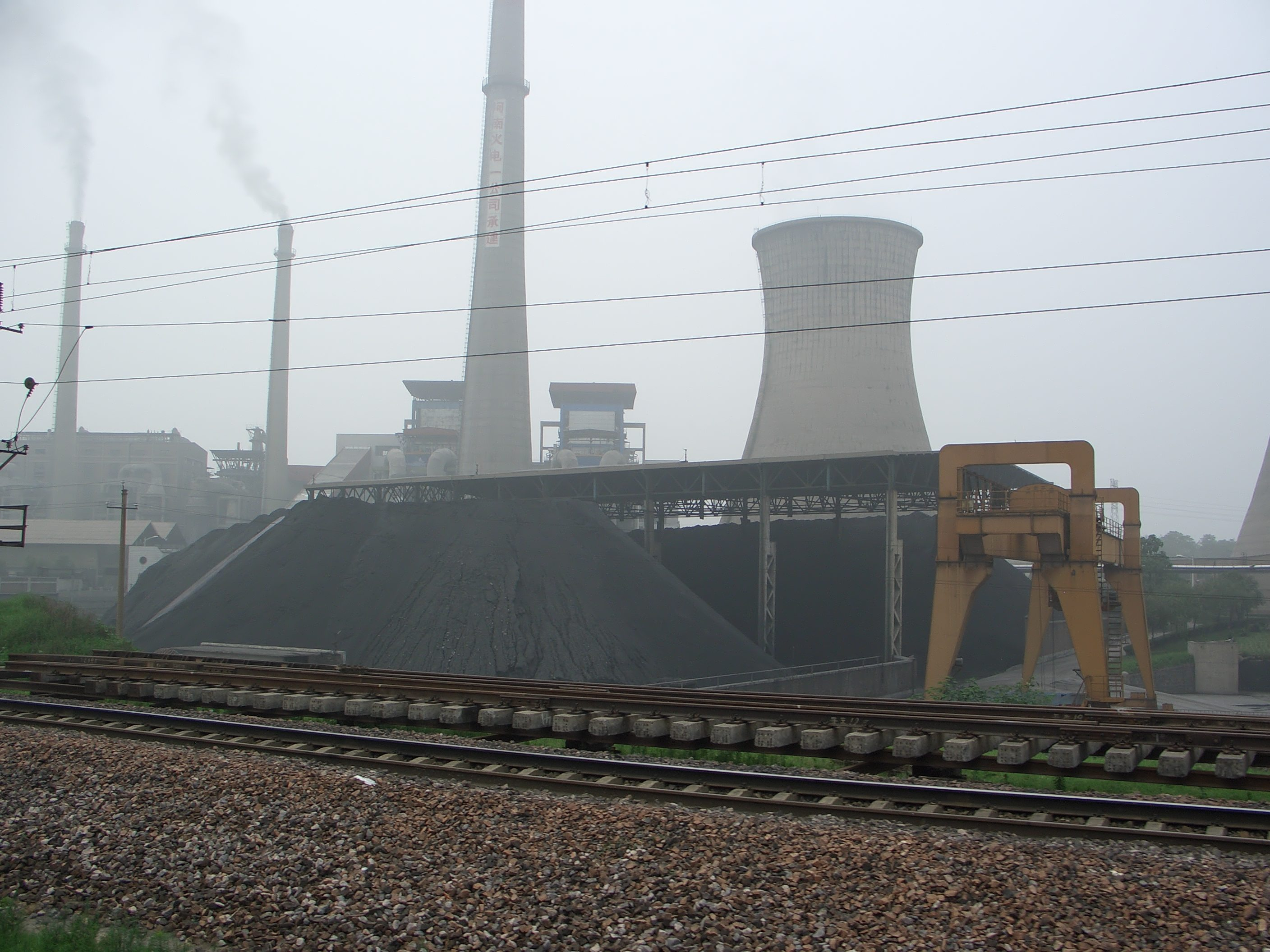
Coal-fired power plant in China

An important motive for reducing the share of coal in China's energy balance is the significant health consequences of coal combustion. In 2013, a total of approximately 1.6 million people died in China from air pollution, a large proportion of which was caused by energy supply. This was particularly evident after the 'pollution shock' in 2013 and 2014, when hundreds of millions of Chinese suffered from severe smog and fine dust pollution, making air pollution a major economic and social issue in the country. Efforts were intensified and a series of measures were introduced to move towards a more environmentally friendly energy system. Among other things, a plan was adopted to reduce particulate matter and smog pollution; in addition, a ban on the construction of new coal-fired power plants was imposed in particularly polluted regions, and the introduction of the Euro 5 standard in the transport sector was set for 2015 to remove vehicles with particularly high air pollution from the roads. In 2014, 12 of 34 Chinese provinces wanted to reduce their coal consumption. While coal consumption had increased by 3.75% in 2013, it fell by the same percentage in 2015.The Euro 5 standard came into force nationwide in 2017. By 2030, the share of coal in total energy consumption is to fall from 66.6% to below 50%, while the share of renewable energies is to increase from just under 10% in 2012 to 25% in 2030. Achieving these targets would not only reduce environmental pollution but also significantly reduce greenhouse gas emissions. In northern China in particular, a significant proportion of emissions from coal combustion also come from coal heating, which is still widely used there.

As of 2020, over half of the world's coal-generated electricity was produced in China. In 2020 alone, China added 38 gigawatts of coal-fired power generation, over three times what the rest of the world built that year.

China is confident of achieving a rich zero carbon economy by 2050. In 2021, the government ordered all coal mines to operate at full capacity at all times, including holidays; approved new mines, and eliminated restrictions on coal imports. In November 2021, China reached record coal production levels, breaking the previous historic record, established in October 2021.

China's exceedingly high energy demand pushed the demand for relatively cheap coal-fired power. Serious air quality deterioration resulted from the massive use of coal and many Chinese cities suffered severe smog events.

As a consequence, the region of Beijing decided to phase out all its coal-fired power generation by the end of 2015, a plan which it implemented with the closure of the Huaneng Beijing Thermal Power Plant in 2017. Despite this, however, the city imports most of its electricity from other coal-burning areas of the country, and the Huaneng plant has been temporarily reopened several times.

General Secretary of the Chinese Communist Party Xi Jinping announced in a video message at the UN General Assembly in September 2021 that China would no longer build coal-fired power plants abroad.

In 2024 the International Energy Agency said: "Reforms should accompany coal plants in their transition from energy suppliers to providers of flexibility services. While coal plants will continue to play a key role in providing grid stability and flexibility, their contribution in terms of electricity generation will have to decline. This shift requires targeted policies that support coal plants in becoming providers of system services, such as frequency regulation and ramping support, and seasonal flexibility, to ensure a smooth transition towards a more flexible and low-carbon power system."

==== India ====
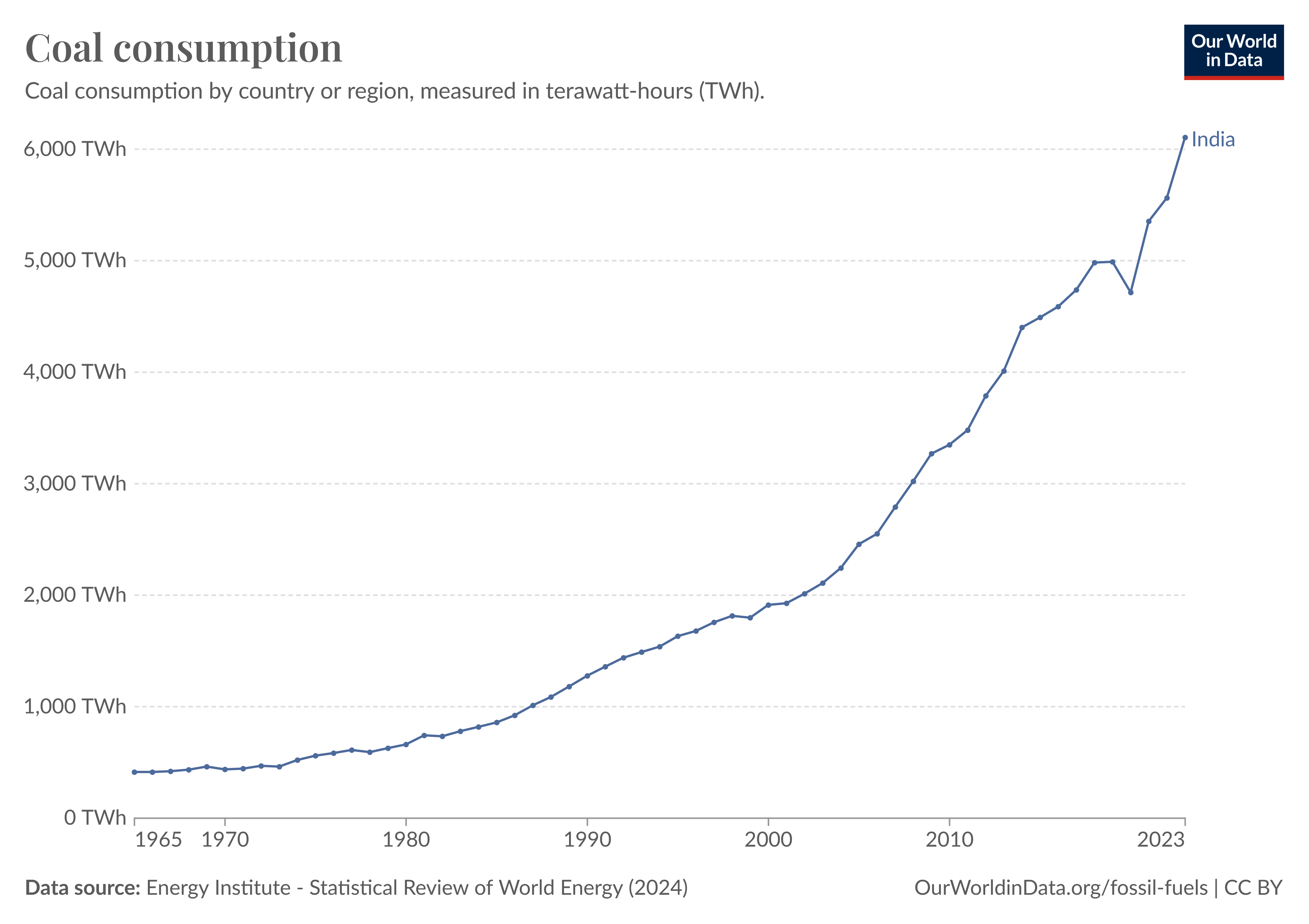
Coal consumption (all sources) in India, 1965–2023

India is the third largest consumer of coal in the world. India's federal energy minister is planning to stop importing thermal coal by 2018. The annual report of India's Power Ministry has a plan to grow power by about 80 GW as part of their 11th 5-year plan, and 79% of that growth will be in fossil fuel–fired power plants, primarily coal. India plans four new "ultra mega" coal-fired power plants as part of that growth, each 4000 MW in capacity. As of 2015, there are six nuclear reactors under construction. In the first half of 2016, the amount of coal-fired generating capacity in pre-construction planning in India fell by 40,000 MW, according to results released by the Global Coal Plant Tracker. In June 2016, India's Ministry of Power stated that no further power plants would be required in the next three years, and "any thermal power plant that has yet to begin construction should back off."

In cement production, carbon neutral biomass is being used to replace coal for reducing carbon foot print drastically.

In 2025 the International Energy Agency said that "it is essential to consider the external costs associated with different fuel types, such as health impacts from air pollution and carbon emissions. Coal-based power generation contributes significantly to air pollution, leading to respiratory and cardiovascular diseases, and emits large amounts of CO2. By incorporating these externalities into fuel prices (e.g., through a robust carbon price signal), the true cost of coal power becomes apparent. This adjustment could make natural gas more competitive in the merit order, as it produces fewer pollutants and lower carbon emissions compared to coal. Reflecting these external costs in fuel pricing would not only promote cleaner energy sources but also improve public health and support climate goals."

==== Indonesia ====
The Indonesia Just Energy Transition Partnership is a 20 billion dollar agreement to decarbonise Indonesia's coal-powered economy, launched on 15 November 2022 at the G20 summit. This Just Energy Transition Partnership comes after the first such agreement, the South Africa JET-IP, which was announced in 2021 as a partnership with Germany, France, the UK and US. The agreement with Indonesia involves all G7 countries as funding contributors, including Canada, Italy and Japan. It also includes non G7 members Denmark and Norway. The JETP aims to develop a comprehensive investment plan (the JETP Investment and Policy Plan) to achieve Indonesia's decarbonisation goals.

Under the JETP, the aim is for Indonesia to reach net-zero emissions of greenhouse gases from electricity production by 2050, bringing forward its target by a decade, and reach a peak in those emissions by 2030. According to two think tanks, the USD 20 bn allocated under the programme are insufficient for these goals.

On the sidelines of the November 2022 G20 summit, the Asian Development Bank signed an agreement with Cirebon Electric Power to open discussions on accelerated retirement of the Cirebon Steam Power Plant. However as of early 2026 the progress of the Indonesia JETP has been slow and remains in doubt.

==== Japan ====
Japan, the world's fourth-largest economy, made a major move to use more fossil fuels in 2012, when the nation shut down nuclear reactors following the Fukushima accident. Nuclear, which had supplied 30 percent of Japanese electricity from 1987 to 2011, supplied only 2 percent in 2012 (hydropower supplied 8 percent). Nuclear electricity was replaced with electricity from petroleum, coal, and liquified natural gas. As a result, electricity generation from fossil fuels rose to 90 percent in 2012. By 2021, Japan generated 30% of its electricity from coal.

In January 2017, the Japanese government announced plans to build 45 new coal-fired power plants in the next ten years, largely to replace expensive electricity from petroleum power plants. Japan has 140 coal plants of which 114 are classified as inefficient and as a result the government intends to shut these down by 2050 to meet its climate commitments.

==== Philippines ====
The Philippines has stop issuing permits for the construction of new greenfield coal power plants in 2020. Six provinces have passed ordinance banning coal power plants in their jurisdiction as of 2019 namely: Bohol, Guimaras, Ilocos Norte, Masbate, Negros Oriental, Occidental Mindoro, and Sorsogon

The Department of Energy in December 2023 has urged for the voluntary early and orderly decommissioning or repurposing of existing coal-fired power plants in line of the Philippines' goal to have a 50 percent renewable energy share by 2040.

==== South Korea ====
In 2024 think tank Ember said "South Korea's coal generation in 2023 was only 21% below its 2017 peak. It is one of the few OECD countries that has seen a large rise in electricity demand, which has doubled since 2000. The rise in clean power was not enough to meet this demand growth. As of 2023, coal generation was almost twice as high as in 2000, even though it has fallen from its peak.

==== Turkey ====
Studies show that coal power phase out is feasible. The insurance industry is slowly withdrawing from fossil fuels. In the mid-2020s plants fuelled by local coal became less profitable as the price of renewables and imported coal and gas fell, but converting them to run on imported coal or gas would be expensive.

In 2021 the World Bank said that a plan for a just transition away from coal is needed, and environmentalists say it should be gone by 2030. The World Bank has proposed general objectives and estimated the cost, but has suggested government do far more detailed planning. According to a 2021 study by several NGOs if coal power subsidies were completely abolished and a carbon price introduced at around US$40 (which is lower than the 2021 EU Allowance) then all coal power stations would close down before 2030. According to Carbon Tracker in 2021 $1b of investment on the Istanbul Stock Exchange was at risk of stranding, including $300 m for EÜAŞ. Turkey has $3.2 billion in loans for its energy transition. Small modular reactors have been suggested to replace coal power. A 2023 study suggests the early 2030s and at the latest 2035 as a practical target for phase-out. A 2024 study says that, although some plants would shutdown due to technological or economic obsolescence, a complete phase out by 2035 would require additional capital expenditure on electricity storage: however the study did not consider demand response or electricity trading with the EU.

Some energy analysts say old plants should be shut down. Three coal-fired power plants, which are in Muğla Province, Yatağan, Yeniköy and Kemerköy, are becoming outdated. However, if the plants and associated lignite mines were shut down, about 5000 workers would need funding for early retirement or retraining. There would also be health and environmental benefits, but these are difficult to quantify as very little data is publicly available in Turkey on the local pollution by the plants and mines. Away from Zonguldak mining and the coal-fired power plant employ most working people in Soma district. According to Coşku Çelik "coal investments in the countryside have been regarded as an employment opportunity by the rural population".

According to SwitchCoal a 20 billion dollar investment in converting 10 plants to solar, wind and batteries would make an extra 13 billion dollars profit over 30 years. They assumed no carbon pricing and estimated lignite opex at 1 UScent per kWh. They say this would save 35 megatonnes of emissions a year by installing 15 GWp of solar, 8 of wind and 0.7 GW battery.

Analyst Haluk Direskeneli said it 2025 that although they may longer be profitable it would be politically hard to shut down Soma, Tunçbilek, and Çatalağzı power stations as labour unions and opposition parties would likely protest possible job losses in their state-run coal suppliers TKİ and TTK.

==== Vietnam ====
At the COP 26 in 2021, Vietnam pledged to phase out unabated coal power by the 2040s or soon thereafter. This is part of the country's announcement to achieve net zero emissions by 2050. In December 2022, Vietnam joined the Just Energy Transition Partnership. Under this partnership, the country will receive $15.5 billion in the next 3–5 years to accelerate decarbonising its electricity sector, including shifting coal power use peak by 2030 instead of 2035. With coal contributing to about 50% of the electricity generation, Vietnam is facing numerous challenges to phase out coal while electricity demand is increasing around 10%/year. It could, however, ramp up the penetration of solar and wind power, particularly offshore wind, to replace coal power

=== Europe ===
==== Austria ====
Coal-fired power plants were shut down and demolished or converted to other energy sources such as oil or gas, e.g. the Voitsberg steam power plant in 2015.

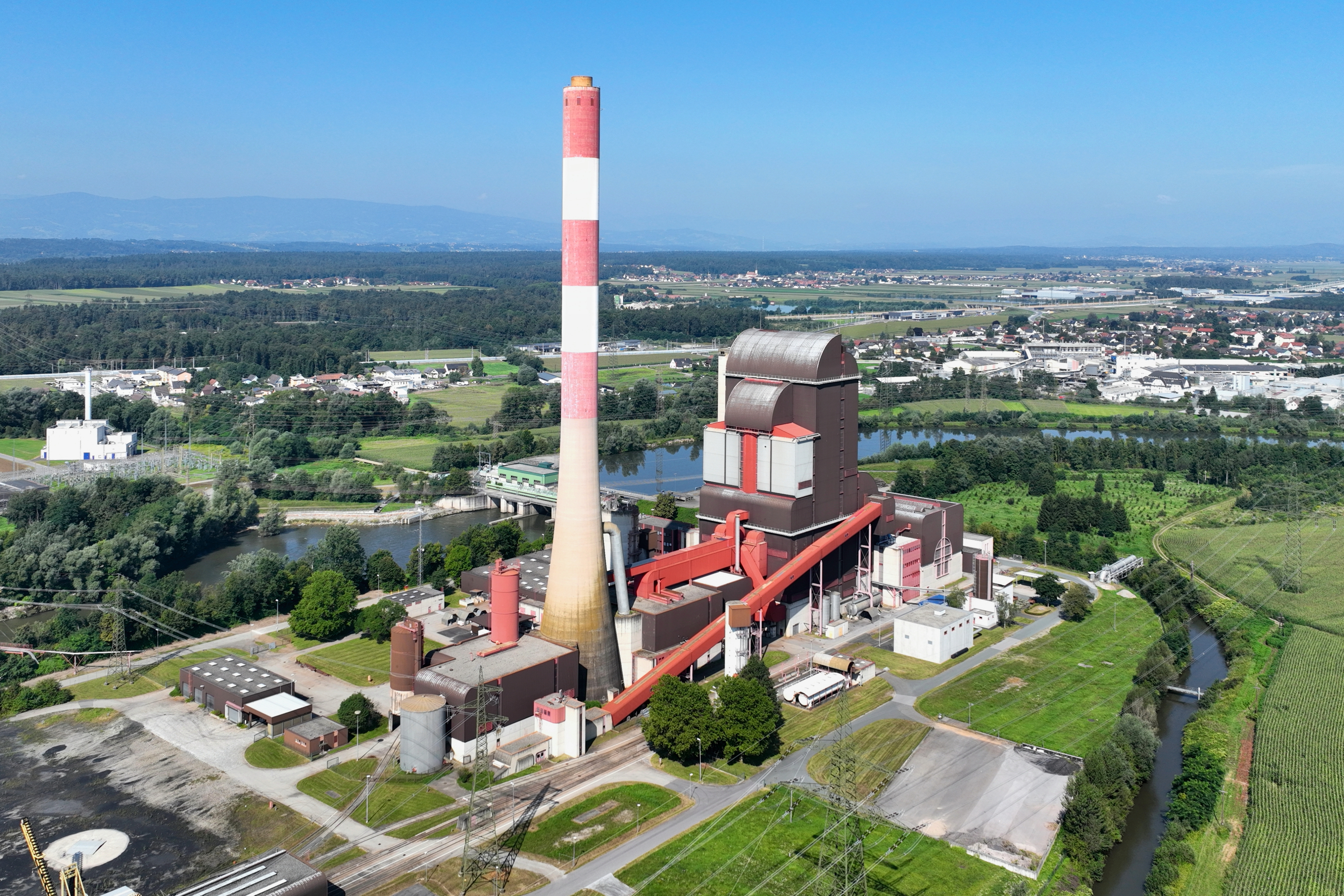
Mellach coal-fired power station in Austria

In autumn 2019, coal-fired power generation was discontinued at the Dürnrohr power plant. In spring 2020, the Mellach district heating plant was the last coal-fired power plant in Austria to temporarily suspend coal-fired power generation. This made Austria the third European country after Belgium and, one day after Sweden, to temporarily suspend coal-fired power generation. In June 2022, the operator announced that, in consultation with the Austrian federal government, the Mellach power plant would be converted again so that it could be operated with coal in the event of restrictions on the supply of natural gas. This should ensure long-term security of supply after Russia reduced the amount of gas supplied to Austria as a result of its invasion of Ukraine.

At Voestalpine in Linz, processes for reducing iron ore without coke are being researched. Coke is produced from coal; the production of pig iron in blast furnaces emits large amounts of CO2, which accelerates global warming.

==== Belgium ====
In 2009/2010, the Federal Government of Belgium rejected an application to build a new power plant in Antwerp. Belgium was the first European country to phase out coal-fired power generation: the Langerlo power plant (de) stopped operating in March 2016.

==== Czech Republic ====
In December 2020, Industry Minister Karel Havlíček announced that the Czech Republic wants to phase out coal-fired power generation by 2038. The cabinet of Petr Fiala, sworn in at the end of 2021, committed to an earlier coal phase-out and the end of coal mining by 2033. Around half of domestic energy production came from coal in 2019, although the share had already fallen by 36 per cent since 2009. Environment Minister Anna Hubáčková spoke out in favour of phasing out coal by 2030, or 2033 at the latest.

==== Denmark ====
In 1984, Denmark still generated 86% of its electricity from coal. On 29 June 2018, the government laid down in the Energy Agreement that it would phase out coal-fired power generation by 2030. On 23 March 2021, Beyond Coal reported that the Danish government was bringing forward the coal phase-out by two years to 2028.

==== Finland ====
In November 2016, the Finnish government presented a plan to parliament that includes phasing out coal by 2030. In 2019, Finland enacted a ban of coal use for energy purposes starting on 1 May 2029, ahead of the 2030 schedule discussed earlier. As of 2020, coal represented only 4.4% of electricity generated in the country. Finland is a founding member of the Powering Past Coal Alliance along 18 other countries. In 2023, 18 years after the beginning of the construction and after extreme increases in cost, Unit 3 of Olkiluoto Nuclear Power Plant started producing electricity.

==== France ====
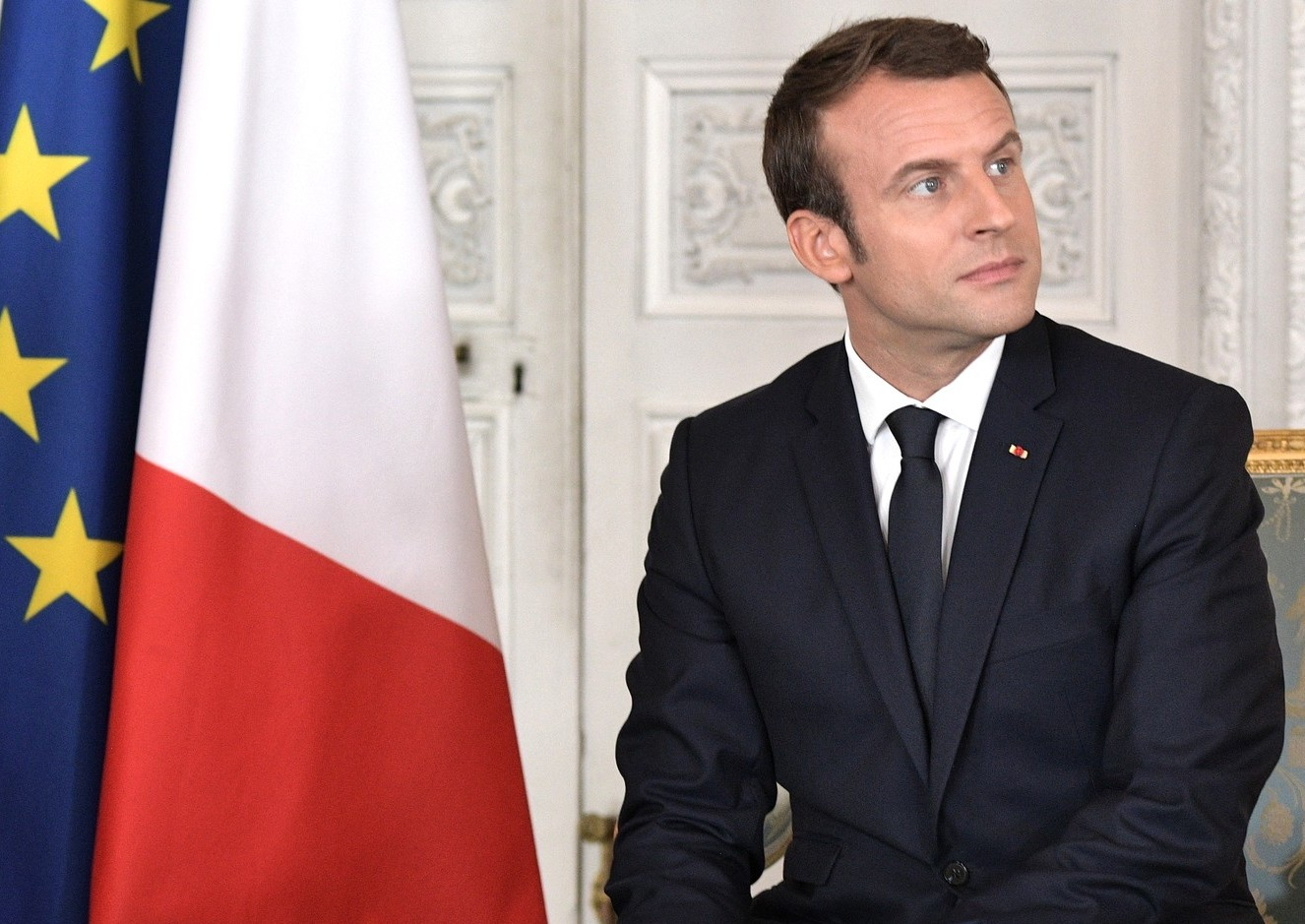
On 30 December 2017, Emmanuel Macron signed a law planning the end of fossil-fuel extraction in French territories.

The French government intended to close or convert the nation's last four coal plants by 2022.
In April 2021 the Le Havre coal plant unit was shut down.

In December 2017, to fight against global warming, France adopted a law banning new fossil fuel exploitation projects and closing current ones by 2040 in all of its territories. France thus became the first country to programme the end of fossil fuel exploitation.

In 2021, it was announced that the Cordemais Power Station would not stop burning coal until 2024. Previously, plans were in place to convert the power plant to biomass firing, primarily from waste materials. The project failed mainly due to cost reasons. After the power plant was shut down, the missing electrical energy was to be replaced by the new Flamanville 3 nuclear reactor. Reactor 3 has been synchronized on 3 December 2024.

==== Germany ====
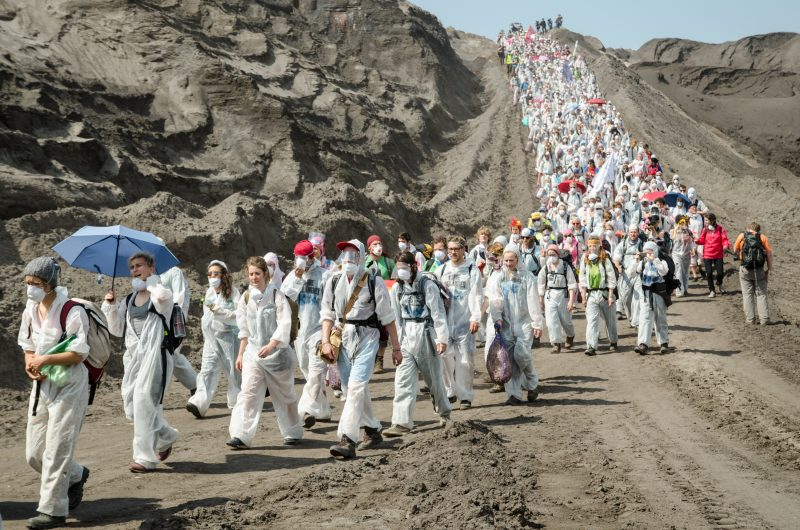
3500–4000 environmental activists blocking a coal mine to limit climate change (Ende Gelände 2016)

Coal power phase-out in Germany is in progress. Phase-out of burning coal in Germany in power plants is scheduled for 2038, but market forces may mean that some coal plants will close earlier.

On 29 January 2020, as part of a federal-state agreement to phase out coal, the basis was laid for a coal phase-out law that will regulate the end of coal-fired power generation by 2038. This was preceded by several draft laws on reductions in the hard coal sector and months of negotiations with lignite companies, primarily RWE and LEAG. The agreement was based on the decisions of the Commission for Growth, Structural Change and Employment. Among other things, it was decided to preserve the Hambach Forest, to establish an orderly phase-out plan by 2038, which includes the closure of approximately 2.8 gigawatts by the end of 2022 and a further 5.7 gigawatts of power plant capacity by the end of 2029, as well as a review of the decommissioning planned after 2030 at the revision dates in 2026 and 2029 to end coal-fired power generation by 2035 if possible. Environmental organisations criticised the failure to implement key decisions of the Coal Commission and therefore spoke of a 'termination of the coal compromise'. Contrary to the agreement, there is no review date in 2023, the Datteln 4 power plant will be allowed to go online, and half of the lignite capacity will not be shut down until between 2035 and 2038. Kai Niebert, president of the Deutscher Naturschutzring (German Nature Conservation Union), criticised that the deviation from the Coal Commission compromise in the phase-out of lignite would lead to additional emissions of approximately 180 million tonnes of carbon dioxide, and stated that he felt "simply betrayed" by the government. Economist Barbara Praetorius, one of the four chairs of the Coal Commission, also stated that the plan presented by the government deviated "in important points" from the Commission's proposals and reneged on the compromise reached there. Criticism was also levelled at the months-long delay in reaching a decision, with the government taking over a year to make a decision after the Commission for Growth, Structural Change and Employment announced its findings.

==== Greece ====
During the 2019 UN Climate Summit Greece announced that it would phase out coal mining and coal-fired power generation by 2028. At that time, coal still accounted for 31% of the country's electricity. Most coal-fired power plants are to be shut down by 2023, with only the Ptolemaida V power plant, which is still under construction, allowed to remain on the grid until 2028. On 22 April 2021, Beyond Coal reported that Greece was bringing forward its coal phase-out to 2025 due to increased costs for emission allowances.

==== Hungary ====
In Hungary, most coal-fired power plants were shut down primarily for economic reasons. As of June 2020, there were discussions about closing the last remaining lignite-fired power plant, Mátra, which is responsible for almost half of the CO2 emissions in the Hungarian energy sector. Deputy Foreign Minister Barbara Botos said the government was in favour of 2030 as the phase-out year.

In March 2021, iwr.de reported that Hungary wanted to shut down its last coal-fired power plant in 2025, completing its coal phase-out five years earlier than previously planned.

==== Italy ====
On 24 October 2017, Carlo Calenda, then Minister of Industry in the Gentiloni Cabinet, presented a draft of a neaw energy strategy to the Italian Parliament that included phasing out coal by 2025. The government adopted the strategy on 10 November 2017. Italy had already phased out nuclear power around 19 months after the Chernobyl disaster. In 2017, 15 per cent of electricity came from coal-fired power plants.

As of 2020, Italy still has nine coal power plants, for a total capacity of 7702 MW. Enel, Italy's largest power generator, intends to shut down three power plants in early 2021.

==== Netherlands ====
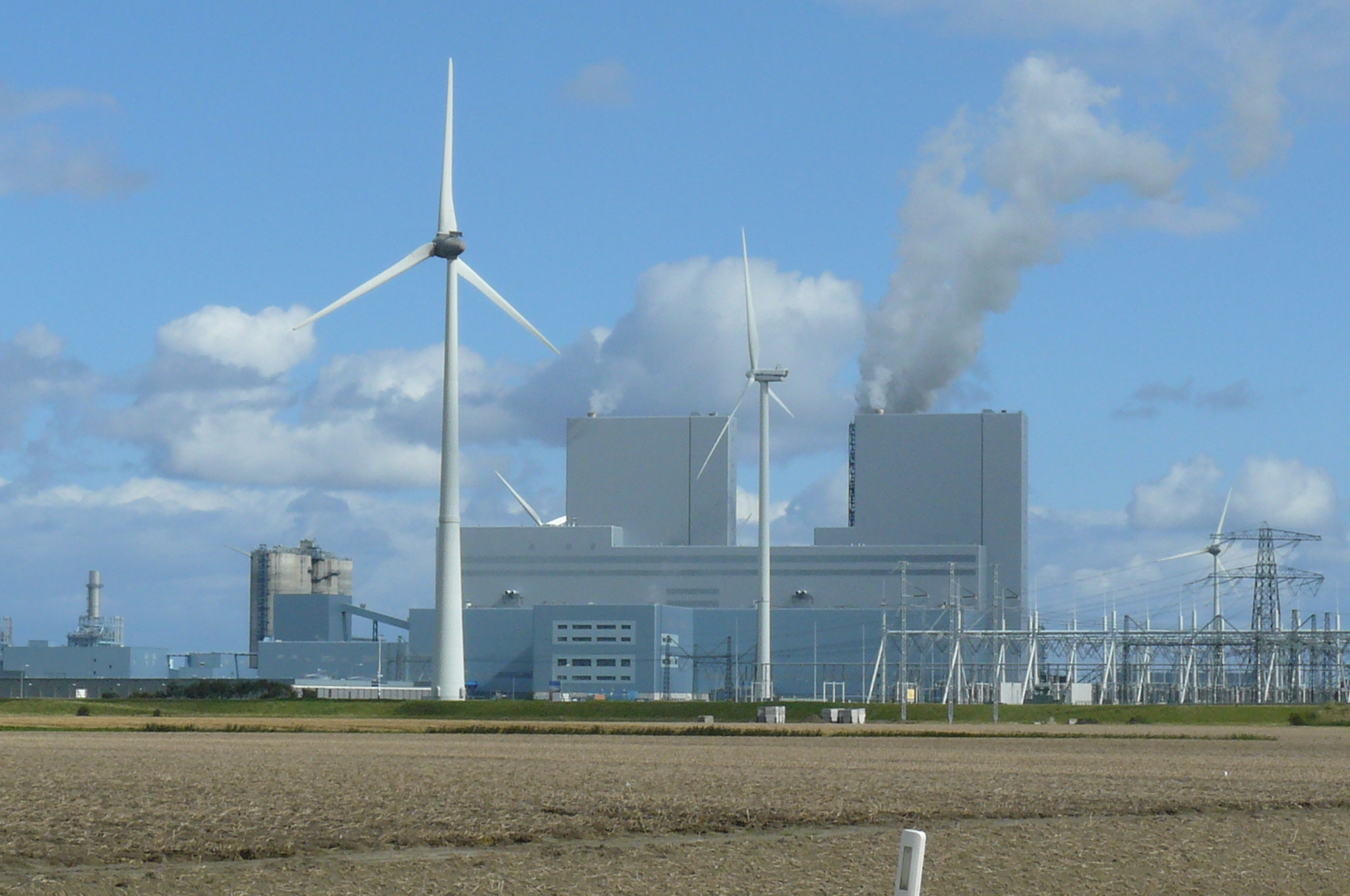
RWE commissioned the Eemshaven coal-fired power plant in the Netherlands in 2015. The plant is to be decommissioned by 2030.

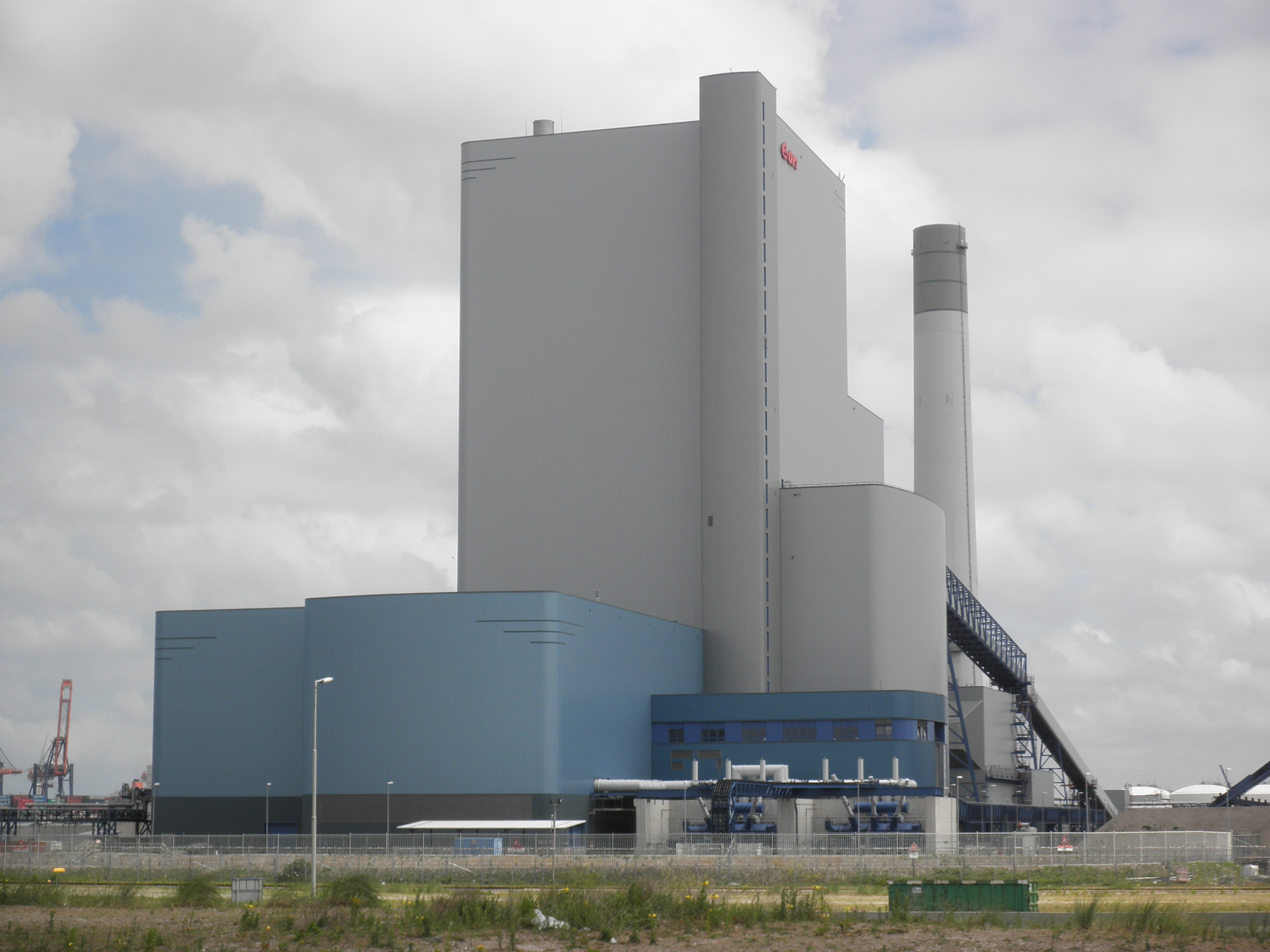
Maasvlakte power plant (Uniper)

In 2017, the four parties forming the Rutte III cabinet agreed in their coalition agreement to take all existing coal-fired power plants in the Netherlands off the grid by 2030. Of the five coal-fired power plants, three had only recently gone into operation. The first power plant was scheduled to close during the government's legislative term in 2021. In 2018, the Minister for Economic Affairs, Eric Wiebes, announced that older coal-fired power stations must be shut down by 2024 and newer ones by 2029 at the latest. In addition, a minimum price for carbon dioxide emission allowances was to be introduced. The country's emissions are to be reduced by 49% by 2030. In 2019, a law was passed prohibiting the use of coal for electricity generation by the beginning of 2030 at the latest for climate protection reasons. Unlike in Germany, there is no compensation for this in the Netherlands. On 30 November 2022, a court in The Hague ruled that the German companies RWE and Uniper are not entitled to compensation for lost profits in the Netherlands. RWE had sued for 1.4 billion euros in damages. Both companies based their claim on the Energy Charter Treaty. A decision by the International Centre for Settlement of Investment Disputes was expected in early 2023. However, the proceedings were suspended and the German Federal Court of Justice ruled in July 2023 that the arbitration proceedings were inadmissible. RWE and Uniper subsequently withdrew their arbitration claims.

==== Norway ====
On 5 June 2015, the Norwegian Parliament unanimously decided that the Norwegian Government Pension Fund, with assets of almost €600 billion, should divest its holdings in companies that generate 30 per cent or more of their profits from coal. According to estimates, this affects between 50 and 75 companies. In October 2023, Norway's only coal-fired power plant, the Longyear power plant in Longyearbyen on Svalbard, was shut down. In 2025, the last coal mine (Gruve 7) of Store Norske Spitsbergen Kulkompani was closed on Spitsbergen.

==== Poland ====
According to Poland's energy strategy of November 2018, the share of coal in electricity production should be reduced to 50 per cent by 2030 and to 22 per cent by 2040. In September 2020, Climate Protection Minister Michał Kurtyka presented a strategy paper for a gradual phase-out of coal. According to this, coal should only account for a maximum of 56 per cent of the electricity mix by 2030, and coal should only be allowed for heat generation in cities until 2030 and in rural areas until 2040. The lost energy generation capacity should be replaced primarily by the introduction of nuclear power and offshore wind energy, and international gas network connections should be expanded as a temporary measure. In the former mining areas, subsidies should create new jobs in the renewable energy sector. At the end of September 2020, the government and miners' unions agreed to close all coal mines in Poland by 2049. Due to cheaper and, in some cases, higher-quality foreign coal, Polish coal mining has long been unprofitable.

After the parliamentary elections in 2023, there was a change of government, ending the eight-year rule of the PIS party. Donald Tusk formed the Tusk III cabinet, which is pursuing a new energy policy.

In 2024 over half of electricity in Poland was generated by coal. Katowice has joined the Powering Past Coal Alliance.

==== Portugal ====
Portugal shut down its last coal-fired power plant in November 2021. The phase-out date had been brought forward several times. The date for phasing out coal-fired power generation, initially planned for 2030, was brought forward to 2023 at the end of 2019. According to this, the Pego power plant was to be shut down in November 2021 and the Sines power plant in September 2023. In July 2020, however, the power plant operator EDP announced that it was aiming to shut down Sines, Portugal's largest coal-fired power plant, as early as January 2021. The reasons given were the fall in natural gas prices and the rise in the cost of certificates in European emissions trading. The closure finally took place on 14 January 2021. On 30 November 2021, coal firing at the Pego (Abrantes) power plant was finally discontinued, making Portugal the fourth country in Europe to complete its coal phase-out.

==== Republic of Ireland ====
In July 2018, the House of Representatives of the Republic of Ireland passed a law requiring the Irish Strategic Investment Fund to divest all its investments in coal, oil and gas within the next five years. In July 2025, the Moneypoint coal-fired power station in County Clare ceased burning coal, marking the end of coal use in Ireland.

==== Spain ====
In October 2018, the First government of Pedro Sánchez and Spanish trade unions settled an agreement to close ten Spanish coal mines at the end of 2018. The government pre-engaged to spend 250 million Euro to pay for early retirements, occupational retraining and structural changes. In 2018, about 2.3 percent of the electric energy produced in Spain was produced in coal-fired power stations. Overall, coal accounted for 15 per cent of electricity generation that year. On 30 June 2020, seven of the remaining 15 coal-fired power plants were shut down. Four more power plants are preparing to close within the next two years. The reasons given for the shutdown are stricter European environmental regulations and the rising price of certificates in European emissions trading. This means that economic operation is no longer possible.

==== Sweden ====
In 2019 coal was still used to a limited extent to fuel three co-generation plants in Sweden that produced electricity and district heating. The operators of these plants planned to phase out coal by 2020, 2022 and 2025 respectively. In August 2019 one of the three remaining coal burning power producers announced that they had phased out coal prematurely in 2019 instead of 2020. Värtaverket was scheduled to close in 2022, but closed in 2020. This was the last coal plant in Sweden, and its closure made Sweden coal free.

In addition to heat and power coal is also used for steel production, there are long-term plans to phase out coal from steel production: Sweden is constructing hydrogen-based pilot steel plant to replace coke and coal usage in steel production. Once this technology is commercialized with the hydrogen generated from renewable energy sources (biogas or electricity), the carbon foot print of steel production would reduce drastically.

==== Switzerland ====
There are no coal-fired power plants in Switzerland itself. Coal has not been mined since the end of the Second World War, as the small Swiss mines were no longer profitable. Until the middle of the 20th century, however, (imported) coal was the most important source of energy in Switzerland, although its share then declined rapidly in favour of electricity and oil, falling to just 0.7% in 2000. Swiss energy companies were involved in coal-fired power plants abroad, but have since largely withdrawn from these investments.

==== United Kingdom ====
In 2015, the end of coal-fired power generation was announced for 2025. In 2020, Prime Minister Boris Johnson brought forward the coal phase-out by one year.

Having been an initiator of the Industrial Revolution, the last coal power station in the United Kingdom (Ratcliffe-on-Soar Power Station in England) stopped operating on 30 September 2024. Scotland's last coal power station closed in 2016, Wales' last coal power station closed in December 2019 and Northern Ireland's last coal power station closed in September 2023.

In 2016, the Longannet, Ferrybridge C and Rugeley power plants were shut down. The Eggborough and Cottam power stations followed in 2018 and 2019. In 2019, coal still accounted for between 0.4 and 2.8 per cent of electricity production. On 31 March 2020, the Aberthaw and Fiddler's Ferry power stations were decommissioned. The West Burton coal-fired power station was shut down on 9 April 2020, and in March 2021, the Drax Power Station ended coal combustion. The Kilroot coal-fired power station in Northern Ireland was shut down in September 2023. Ratcliffe-on-Soar, the last coal-fired power station operating in the UK, was closed on 30 September 2024. This marked the end of coal in the United Kingdom.

Coal power dominated the UK's electricity mix for decades but began to decline after the Dash for Gas in the 1990s, with significant competition from new combined cycle gas turbines. Kellingley Colliery, a deep coal mine in North Yorkshire (England) closed on 18 December 2015.

The trend continued after environmental laws were brought in during the early 21st century to improve air quality, reduce greenhouse gas emissions and incentivise the rollout of renewable energy. In generating capability there was initially the closure of the Hinton Heavies (14 power stations), followed by the closure or conversion to biomass of the remaining coal plants by 2024. In the final few years of coal power in the UK, in 2018 it was less than at any time since the Industrial Revolution. The first "coal free day" took place in 2017. Coal supplied 5.4% of UK electricity in 2018, down from 30% in 2014, and 70% in 1990. As of 2015, Gas-fired power plants continued to provide some firm service. The UK's coal phase-out was also made possible by the fact that the country still operates several nuclear power plants. In 2024, these accounted for around 12.5 per cent of electricity consumption and 5.3 per cent of primary energy consumption.

=== Vatican ===
In the encyclical Laudato si', Pope Francis advocates phasing out the burning of fossil fuels such as coal.

=== Oceania ===
==== Australia ====
Australian power stations are expected to stop burning coal by 2038 or earlier. The Australian electricity market has been moving away from coal as renewables, especially solar power are developed. The proportion of electricity generated by coal-fired power stations dropped to a record low of less than 50% in early 2025.

There is no true transition to a clean economy if the federal government continues to approve new fossil fuel projects. Leading global authorities, including the International Energy Agency, the United Nations, and the scientific community, have consistently stated that no new gas fields, coal mines, or mine extensions are necessary to meet climate goals. The Australia Institute's Coal Mine Tracker keeps track of coal mine proposals and their potential emissions.

In 2023–24, Australian governments allocated $14.5 billion in spending and tax incentives to support the fossil fuel industry, representing a 31% increase from 2022–23. Forward estimates indicate that subsidies have risen from $57 billion to a record $65 billion, an amount 6.5 times larger than the Housing Australia Future Fund. Critics argue that these subsidies contribute to greenwashing and undermine efforts to implement effective climate policies. Advocates for subsidy reform highlight that reducing fossil fuel subsidies could lead to significant emissions reductions while reallocating funds toward public services and sustainable initiatives.

==== New Zealand ====
In October 2007, the Clark Labour government introduced a 10 year moratorium on new fossil fuel thermal power generation. The ban was limited to state-owned utilities, although an extension to the private sector was considered. The new government under MP John Key (NZNP) elected in the 2008 New Zealand general election, repealed this legislation.

In 2014, almost 80 percent of the electricity produced in New Zealand was from sustainable energy. On 6 August 2015, Genesis Energy Limited announced that it would close its two last coal-fired power stations at the Huntly power plant by 2018, which would mean that New Zealand would have completely phased out coal-fired power generation.

Due to drought and gas shortages, an additional unit was recommissioned in 2021, meaning that three of the four former coal/gas combined cycle units are now available again.

== See also ==
- Beyond Coal – a campaign by the Sierra Club to promote renewable energy instead of coal
- Big Coal
- Burning the Future: Coal in America
- The Coal Question
- Powering Past Coal Alliance

== Sources ==
- Efimova, Tatiana; Mazur, Eugene; Migotto, Mauro; Rambali, Mikaela; Samson, Rachel (February 2019). OECD Environmental Performance Reviews: Turkey 2019. OECD (Report). OECD Environmental Performance Reviews. doi:10.1787/9789264309753-en. ISBN 978-92-64-30976-0.
- European Commission (May 2019). "Turkey 2019 Report" (PDF). ec.europa.eu.
