= Powering Past Coal Alliance =

Climate change organization

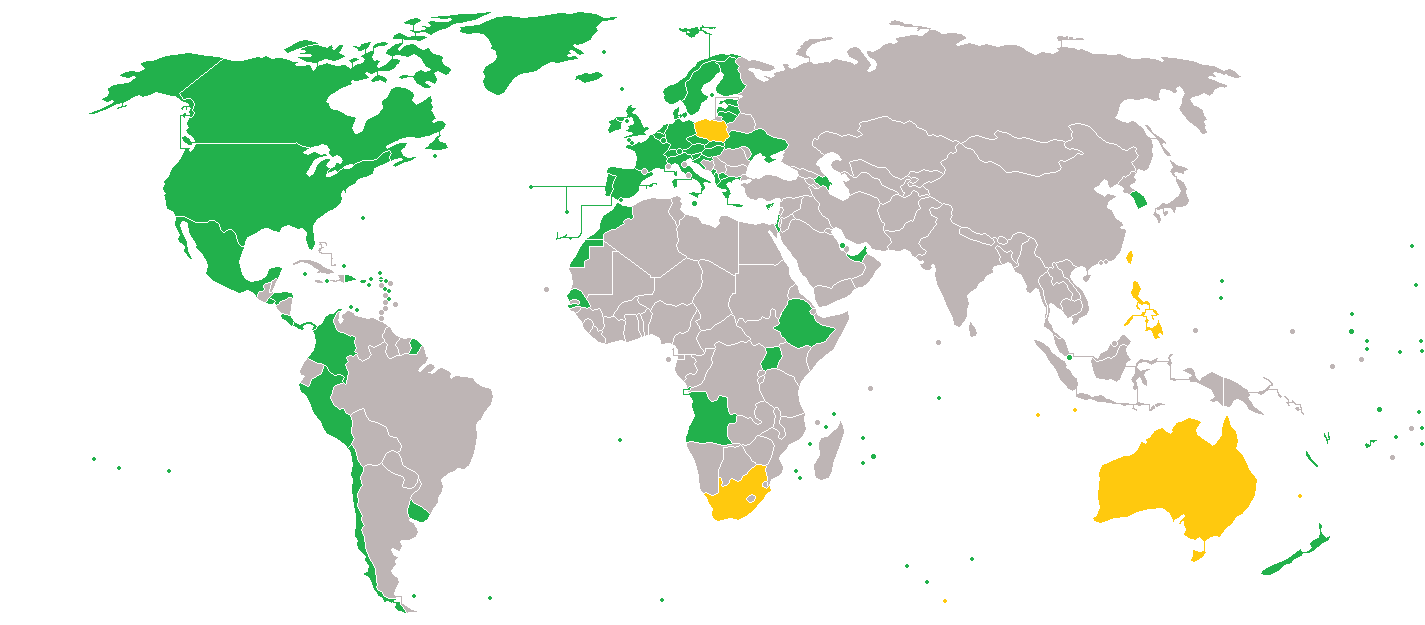
- Map of members
- Formation: 16 November 2017; 8 years ago
- Type: International environmental organization
- Region served: Worldwide
- Website: poweringpastcoal.org

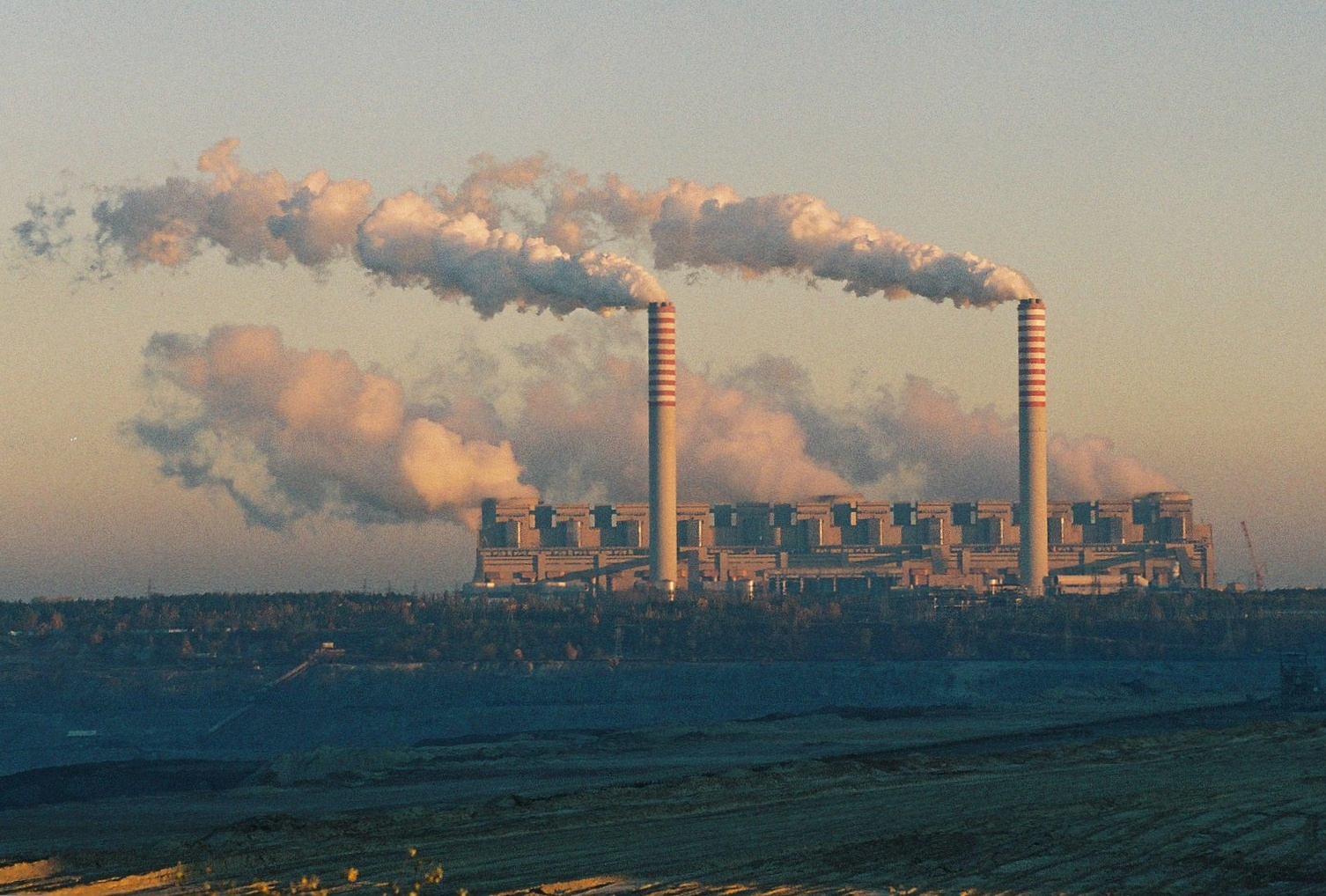
Belchatow Power Station in Poland, Europe's most polluting power plant, which is scheduled to close in 2036

The Powering Past Coal Alliance (PPCA) is a group of 188 countries, cities, regions and organisations aiming to accelerate the coal phase-out of coal-fired power stations, except the very few which have carbon capture and storage. It has been described as a "non-proliferation treaty" for fossil fuels. The project was undertaken with financial support from the Government of Canada, through their environmental department known as Environment and Climate Change Canada.

== History ==
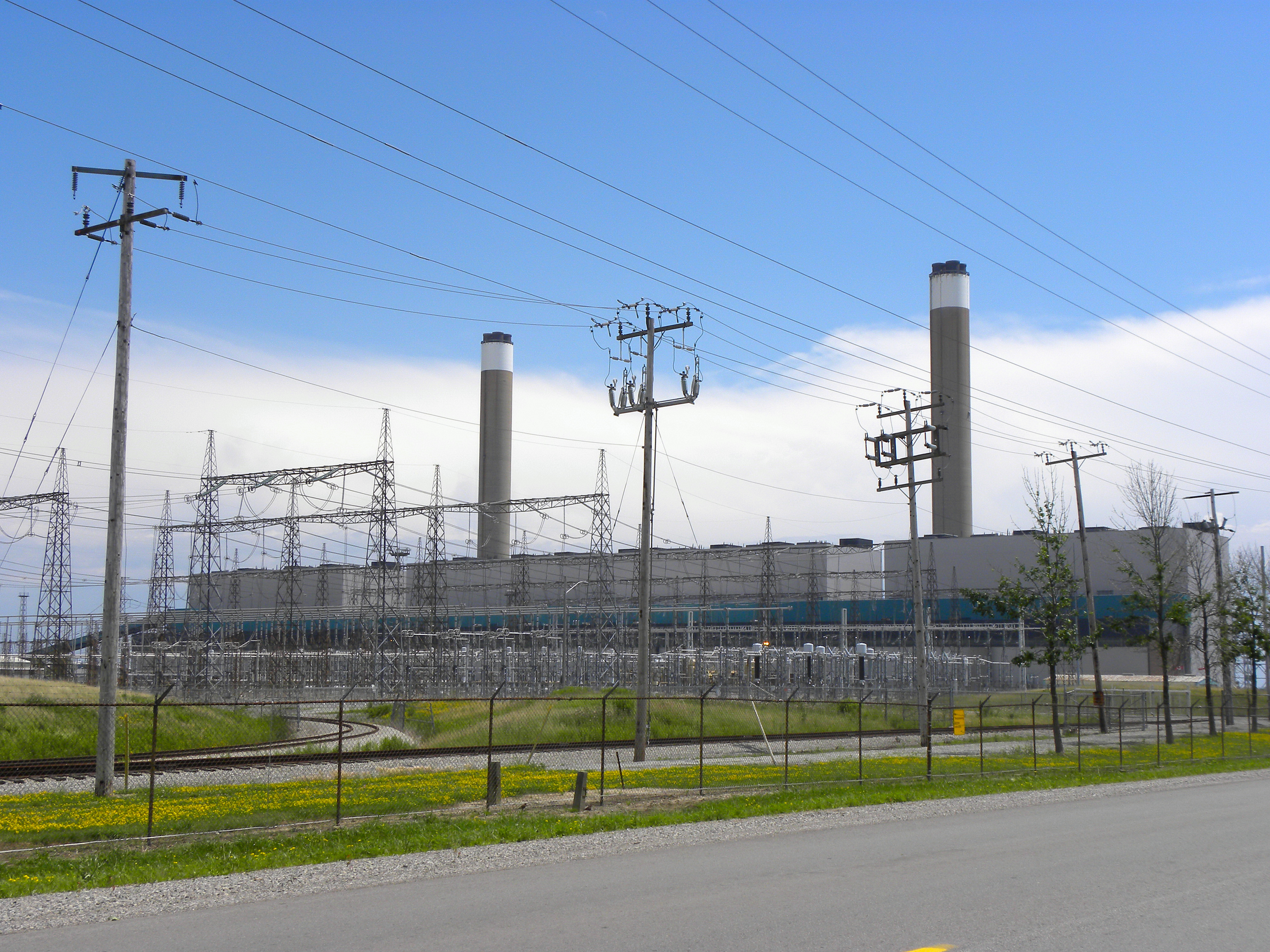
The Nanticoke Generating Station in Ontario, one of the largest power plants to be shut as part of Ontario's coal phaseout

The Alliance was launched by Canada and the UK at the COP23 climate summit in November 2017. Announcing the launch, Climate Action Network-Canada Executive Director Catherine Abreu said: "Canada and the UK are right to kick-start the Alliance, as science tells us that OECD countries need to phase out coal by 2030 at the latest".

By the end of the summit, membership had grown to include over 20 countries, regions and organizations. Within a month membership had grown to over 50. Its purpose is to establish a new international norm, or "standard of appropriate behaviour", that coal should not be burned for power.

In April 2018 a research partnership was announced with Bloomberg Philanthropies.

In October 2018 the South Korean province of South Chungcheong became the first jurisdiction in Asia and the largest user of coal power to join the Alliance. In December 2018 Sydney, Melbourne, Scotland, Scottish Power, Senegal and Israel also joined and in September 2019 seven new members joined including Germany and Slovakia.

In June 2020 6 global finance organisations joined including Desjardins Group, the first major North American financial institution to join.

During 2021 at least 38 new members joined including Hungary, Uruguay, Chile, Estonia, Singapore, Slovenia and Ukraine.

During 2023 at least 15 new members joined including The Czech Republic, Morocco, Colombia and the United States.

== Aims ==
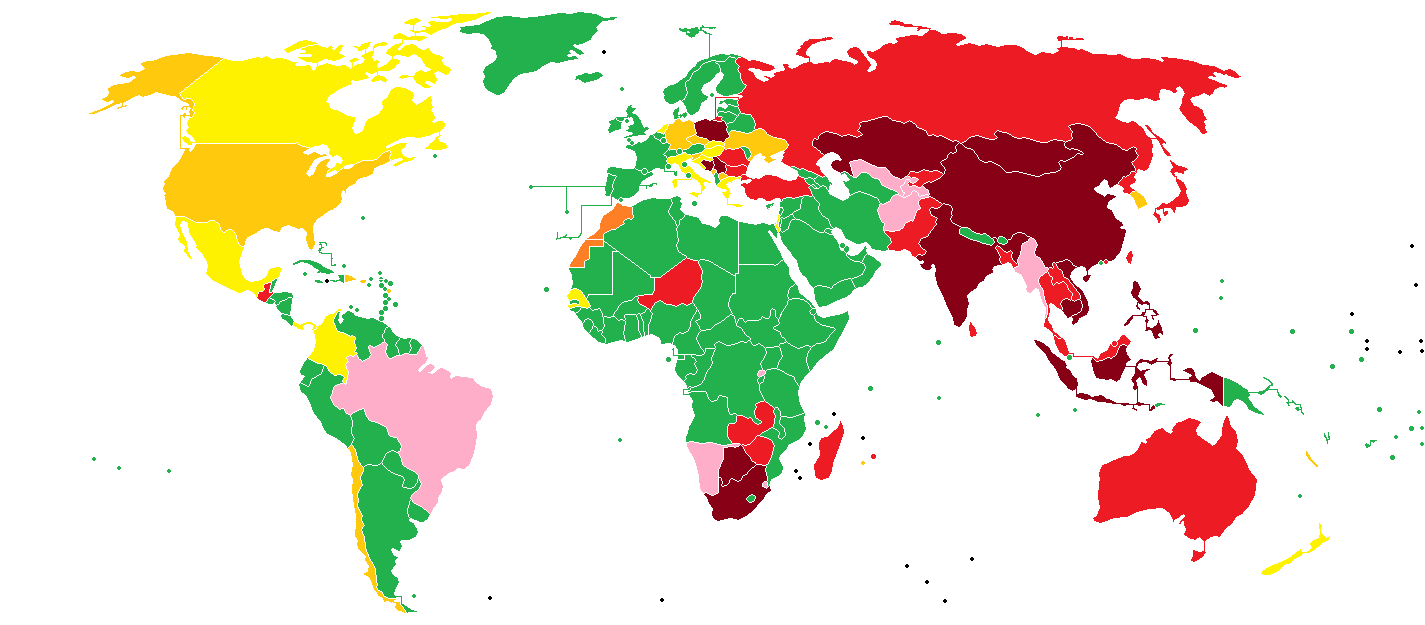
Coal use for power by country and territory in 2024–25. Powering Past Coal Alliance (PPCA) membership also indicated. _ Coal >50% of grid electricity _ Coal 10–50% of grid electricity _ Coal 10–50% of grid electricity (PPCA member) _ Coal <10% of grid electricity _ Coal <10% of grid electricity (PPCA member) _ Coal <1% of grid electricity _ No data

Alliance members agree that:

- Governments/states will phase out existing traditional coal power.
- Governments/states will create a moratorium on any new traditional coal power stations without operational carbon capture and storage.
- Businesses/organisations will power operations without coal.
- Members will ensure policies and investments support clean power.
- Members will restrict financing for traditional coal power without carbon capture and storage.

== Reaction ==
Reacting to the launch, Tracy Carty of Oxfam said the Alliance "represents real and tangible progress in the fight against climate change."

Business change organisation The B Team welcomed the Alliance, and argued that exiting coal must happen as a just transition that protects vulnerable workers and communities such as coal mining communities.

== Progress ==
As of 2025, the US has closed, or planned closure of, 65% of coal plants, Europe has planned the retirement of 50% of its coal fleet, and Canada has reduced its coal capacity by 83%.

Several countries have closed all of their coal plants including:

- Belgium closed its last coal plant in 2016.
- Austria closed its last coal plant in 2020.
- Sweden closed its last coal plant in 2020.
- The UAE converted its only coal plant to natural gas in 2022.
- Norway closed its last coal plant in 2023.
- United Kingdom closed its last coal plant in 2024.
- Ireland closed its last coal plant in 2025.

Ethiopia had planned what would have been its only coal plant in 2011, but it is not being built.

== Members ==
Members of the Powering Past Coal Alliance as of November 2025 were:

=== Nations ===
1. Albania
2. Angola
3. Austria
4. Azerbaijan
5. Bahrain
6. Belgium
7. Canada
8. Chile
9. Colombia
10. Costa Rica
11. Croatia
12. Cyprus
13. Czech Republic
14. Denmark
15. Dominican Republic
16. El Salvador
17. Estonia
18. Ethiopia
19. Fiji
20. Finland
21. France
22. Germany
23. Greece
24. Honduras
25. Hungary
26. Iceland
27. Ireland
28. Israel
29. Italy
30. Latvia
31. Liechtenstein
32. Lithuania
33. Luxembourg
34. Kosovo
35. Malta
36. Marshall Islands
37. Mauritius
38. Mexico
39. Montenegro
40. Morocco
41. Netherlands
42. New Zealand
43. Niue
44. North Macedonia
45. Norway
46. Panama
47. Peru
48. Portugal
49. Senegal
50. Singapore
51. Slovakia
52. Slovenia
53. South Korea
54. Spain
55. Sweden
56. Switzerland
57. Tuvalu
58. Uganda
59. Ukraine
60. United Arab Emirates
61. United Kingdom
62. United States
63. Uruguay
64. Vanuatu

=== Sub-national entities ===
1. Alberta, Canada
2. Australian Capital Territory, Australia
3. Baden-Württemberg, Germany
4. Balearic Islands, Spain
5. British Columbia, Canada
6. California, US
7. Colorado, US
8. Connecticut, US
9. Daegu, South Korea
10. Durban, South Africa
11. Eastern Wielkopolska, Poland
12. Gangwon, South Korea
13. Guimaras, Philippines
14. Gyeonggi, South Korea
15. Hawaii, US
16. Honolulu, US
17. Ilocos Norte, Philippines
18. Incheon, South Korea
19. Jeju, South Korea
20. Jeollanam, South Korea
21. Kaohsiung City
22. Koszalin, Poland
23. Kyoto City
24. Los Angeles, US
25. Masbate, Philippines
26. Melbourne, Australia
27. Minnesota, US
28. Negros Occidental, Philippines
29. Negros Oriental, Philippines
30. New Jersey, US
31. New Mexico, US
32. New Taipei City
33. New York, US
34. Ontario, Canada
35. Oregon, US
36. Ormoc, Philippines
37. Philadelphia, US
38. Puerto Rico
39. Quebec, Canada
40. Rotterdam, Netherlands
41. Scotland, UK
42. Seoul, South Korea
43. South Chungcheong, South Korea
44. Sydney, Australia
45. Taichung City, Taiwan
46. Taoyuan City, Taiwan
47. Vancouver, Canada
48. Wales, UK
49. Wałbrzych, Poland
50. Washington, US
51. Wielkopolska, Poland

=== Businesses and other organisations ===
1. ACEN
2. Aberdeen Standard Investments
3. Alterra Power
4. Amundi
5. ArcTern Ventures
6. Autodesk
7. Avant Garde Innovations
8. Aviva
9. Axa Investment Managers
10. BT
11. Caisse de dépôt et placement du Québec
12. Caisse des dépôts et consignations
13. CalPERS
14. Capital Power
15. CCLA Investment Management Limited
16. Central Finance Board of the Methodist Church and Epworth IM
17. Church Commissioners for England
18. Church of England Pensions Board
19. Desjardins Group
20. Diageo
21. Drax
22. DSM
23. DTEK
24. Econet Group
25. EcoSmart
26. EDP
27. Electricité de France (EDF)
28. Eneva
29. Engie
30. Ethos Foundation
31. Export Development Canada
32. Fidelity International
33. GAM
34. Generation Investment Management
35. GeoExchange Coalition
36. GreenScience
37. Hermes Investment Management
38. HSBC
39. Iberdrola
40. Impax Asset Management
41. Indika Energy
42. Kering
43. Legal & General
44. Lloyds Bank
45. M&G Plc
46. Marks and Spencer
47. Mott MacDonald
48. National Grid
49. National Grid (ESO)
50. Natura Cosmetics
51. NatWest
52. Ontario Power Generation
53. Ørsted
54. Pacific Islands Development Forum
55. PensionDanmark
56. Robeco
57. Salesforce
58. Schroders
59. SCOR Global Investments
60. Scottish Power
61. SSE
62. Standard Chartered
63. Stichting Pensioenfonds ABP
64. Storebrand
65. Swiss Re
66. TransAlta
67. Unilever
68. United Church of Canada
69. Vancity
70. Varma Mutual Pension Insurance Company
71. Virgin Group
72. XPND Capital
73. ZE PAK

== See also ==
- Peak coal
- Beyond Coal
- Under2 Coalition
- C40 Cities Climate Leadership Group
- Fossil Fuel Non-Proliferation Treaty Initiative
