= Weighted average cost of carbon =

Financial metric

The Weighted average cost of carbon is used in finance to measure a firm's specific cost of carbon. It expresses how much an organization is expending to either reduce carbon emissions internally (abatement) or offsetting externally (carbon offset). As such, the weighted average cost of carbon is the cost a company incurs to balance its carbon liability (carbon footprint).

It is a term with growing importance as legislation globally moves to internalize the impact of CO_{2} emission through cost mechanisms.

== The formula ==
C = ((V_{a} × E_{a}) + (V_{o} × E_{o})) / L

Symbol	Meaning	Units
C	Weighted average cost of carbon	currency
V_{a}	Volume of carbon abated through internal projects and demand reduction per annum	tons/pa
E_{a}	Averaged annual expenditure to achieve 'Va' over life of projects	currency
V_{o}	Volume of purchased carbon offset per annum	tons/pa
E_{o}	Expenditure per annum to acquire 'Vo'	currency
L	Total carbon liability per annum	tons/pa

== How it works ==
Corporations have multiple ways to balance their carbon liability. They can reduce their carbon emissions (their "carbon footprint") through capital investment, projects and demand reduction. They can purchase emission permits, be allocated quotas (such as European Union Allowances (EUA)) or buy carbon credits. The latter are largely produced by CDM projects (Clean Development Mechanism) and Joint Initiatives. These credits are largely traded in form of Certified Emission Reduction (CER), or Emission Reduction Unit (ERU). Voluntary Emissions Reduction (VER) have a similar function but have not registered / cannot be registered under the rules of the Kyoto Protocol.

== Relevance ==
In a carbon constrained economy, the efficiency of corporations to respond to the cost factor carbon is an important indicator of competitiveness. Financial analysts are beginning to compare companies within industries based on their ability to either reduce their carbon footprint internally or offset carbon liabilities externally through comparatively low cost channels.

== See also ==
- Weighted average cost of capital
