= Beyond Coal =

Energy campaign by the Sierra Club

- Formation: 2010
- Founder: Sierra Club
- Type: Environmental campaign
- Purpose: Closure of coal-fired power plants, prevention of new coal projects, promotion of renewable energy
- Region served: United States and Europe
- Key people: Michael Bloomberg
- Parent organization: Sierra Club

The Beyond Coal movement is a campaign by environmental group the Sierra Club to promote renewable energy instead of coal. Their primary objective is to close coal power plants in the United States, including at least one-third of the country's more than 500 coal plants by 2020, and to replace them with renewable energy sources. The campaign is also active in other countries; for example, they are trying to prevent the construction of the Kosovo C thermal power plant near Pristina, Kosovo; to this end, they have collaborated with academic and Obama administration climate advisor Dan Kammen. Other objectives include keeping coal in the ground, specifically in Appalachia and the Powder River Basin, where the majority of American coal reserves are located, and preventing coal from being exported from America.

The campaign has received at least $80 million from Michael Bloomberg and his philanthropic foundation, Bloomberg Philanthropies. During the early Presidency of George W. Bush, an energy task force convened by Dick Cheney advocated the construction of 200 new coal plants in the United States, warning that if they were not built the entire country would face load shedding as California had just seen. During the Bush administration, the Beyond Coal campaign prevented 170 of the 200 plants from being built.

== Europe Beyond Coal ==
In November 2017, a campaign called Europe Beyond Coal (EBC), was launched by a network of civil society organisations in Europe. This campaign was partly inspired by but independent of the US Beyond Coal campaign. Many European countries have committed to closing coal plants by 2030 and EBC's goal is to accelerate that vision.

Europe Beyond Coal is an alliance of civil society groups working to catalyse the closures of coal mines and power plants, prevent the building of any new coal projects and hasten the just transition to clean, renewable energy and energy efficiency. Over 30 NGOs, including Greenpeace, WWF, the European Environmental Bureau, Climate Action Network Europe and many others, take part in the European campaign.

== See also ==
- Phasing out coal
- Environmental issues with coal
- Powering Past Coal Alliance
