= Carbon retirement =

Carbon emission reduction scheme

Carbon retirement is a mechanism within carbon emission trading that aims to mitigate climate change by permanently removing emission allowances from circulation.

In the European Union Emission Trading Scheme, EU Emission Allowances permit holders to emit a specified amount of carbon dioxide. If allowances are removed through carbon retirement, this increases the scarcity and cost of allowances, contributing to the overall reduction of carbon emissions.

Additionally, carbon retirement encompasses the purchase and permanent retirement of carbon credits, certificates representing the prevention of greenhouse gas emissions or removing these gases from the atmosphere. Companies often use these credits to offset emissions from operations that are challenging to eliminate immediately, thus contributing to their environmental responsibility efforts. Companies could potentially claim "retired" emission allowances as their own carbon credits, as compensation for emissions from sources that will eventually be eliminated.

Carbon retirement has been described as "straightforward and transparent," compared to other offsets which can involve more complex methodologies and trading.

== Use ==
2020: McKinsey Sustainability reported a significant uptick in the retirement of carbon credits, with approximately 95 million tons of CO_{2} equivalent retired in 2020 alone, more than doubling the figures from 2017.

2022: British media outlet Carbon Brief observed that 146 million carbon credits were retired from the four largest registries for carbon-offset projects in the voluntary market, indicating a substantial increase in the volume of retired credits within just three years.
