= Peak coal =

Peak consumption or production of coal

Peak coal is the moment of maximum consumption of coal, after which it is assumed that coal consumption would decrease. Historically, it was widely believed that the supply-side would eventually drive peak coal due to the depletion of coal reserves. However, since the increasing global efforts to limit climate change, peak coal has been driven by demand. This is due in large part to the rapid expansion of natural gas and renewable energy. As of 2024 over 40% of all energy sector carbon dioxide emissions are from coal, and many countries have pledged to phase-out coal.

The peak of coal's share in the global energy mix was in 2008, when coal accounted for 30% of global energy production. Coal consumption is declining in the United States and Europe, as well as developed economies in Asia. However production increased in India, Indonesia and China, which offset the falls in other regions.

In 2024 the International Energy Agency said: “While coal demand in advanced economies continues to shrink, this decline is expected to be offset by growth in a few emerging and developing economies, such as India, Indonesia and Viet Nam, where the additional energy demand associated with economic growth is set to be met with a variety of sources, including coal. Despite increasing renewable electricity generation, India is expected to see the largest increase in coal use in the coming years, driven by consumption from the power sector and industry. Still, as has been the case for 25 years, China, which consumes 30% more coal than the rest of the world put together, will continue to define global trends.”

== Peak coal demand ==
World annual coal consumption 1980–2019

Consumption trends in the top five coal-consuming countries 1980–2019

Although reserves of coal remain abundant, consumption of coal has declined in many countries. In 2016, Scotland closed its last coal-fired power plant, accommodated by an increase in nuclear power generation (to 42.8% of 2016 output). Scottish renewable energy comprised 42.9% of 2016 output. The term "peak coal" is now used primarily to refer to a peak and subsequent decline in global and national coal consumption. In 2016 experts estimated that China, the world's largest coal consumer, reached peak coal in 2013, and that the world may have passed peak coal. However, in 2017, for the first time in four years, demand for coal rose.

As per Coal 2024 – IEA’s annual coal market report, global coal use has rebounded strongly after plummeting at the height of the pandemic. It is poised to rise to 8.77 billion tonnes in 2024, a record. According to the report, demand is set to stay close to this level through 2027.

As of 2015, China accounted for 50.0 percent of world coal consumption. Chinese coal consumption fell in 2014 and 2015. The last previous decline in Chinese coal consumption had been in 1997 and 1998. While consumption in China and the United States declined in 2015, that of India continued to rise and, in 2015, India surpassed the United States and became the world's second-largest consumer of coal.

== Peak coal production for individual nations ==
Coal production trends 1980–2019 in the top five coal-producing countries (US EIA)

As of 2018, the top coal-extracting countries were China (46.0%), India (9.5%), US (8.6%), Indonesia (6.8%), Australia (6.1%)

=== China ===
China is the largest consumer and mines the most out of the countries that produce coal. In 2019 the IEA predicted that coal use would plateau in 2022, whereas UBS bank forecasts 2023. In 2020 China set a carbon neutral target date. In 2021, the government ordered all coal mines to operate at full capacity at all times, including holidays; approved new mines, and eliminated restrictions on coal imports.

As of 2020, over half of the world's coal-generated electricity was produced in China.

China's most recent five-year plan for coal plans to peak coal consumption in the period 2026-2030.

=== India ===
In 2018 India was the world's second largest coal producer. Partly due to the fall in cost of LPG and renewables peak consumption is forecast for the 2020s, or 2030.

=== United States ===
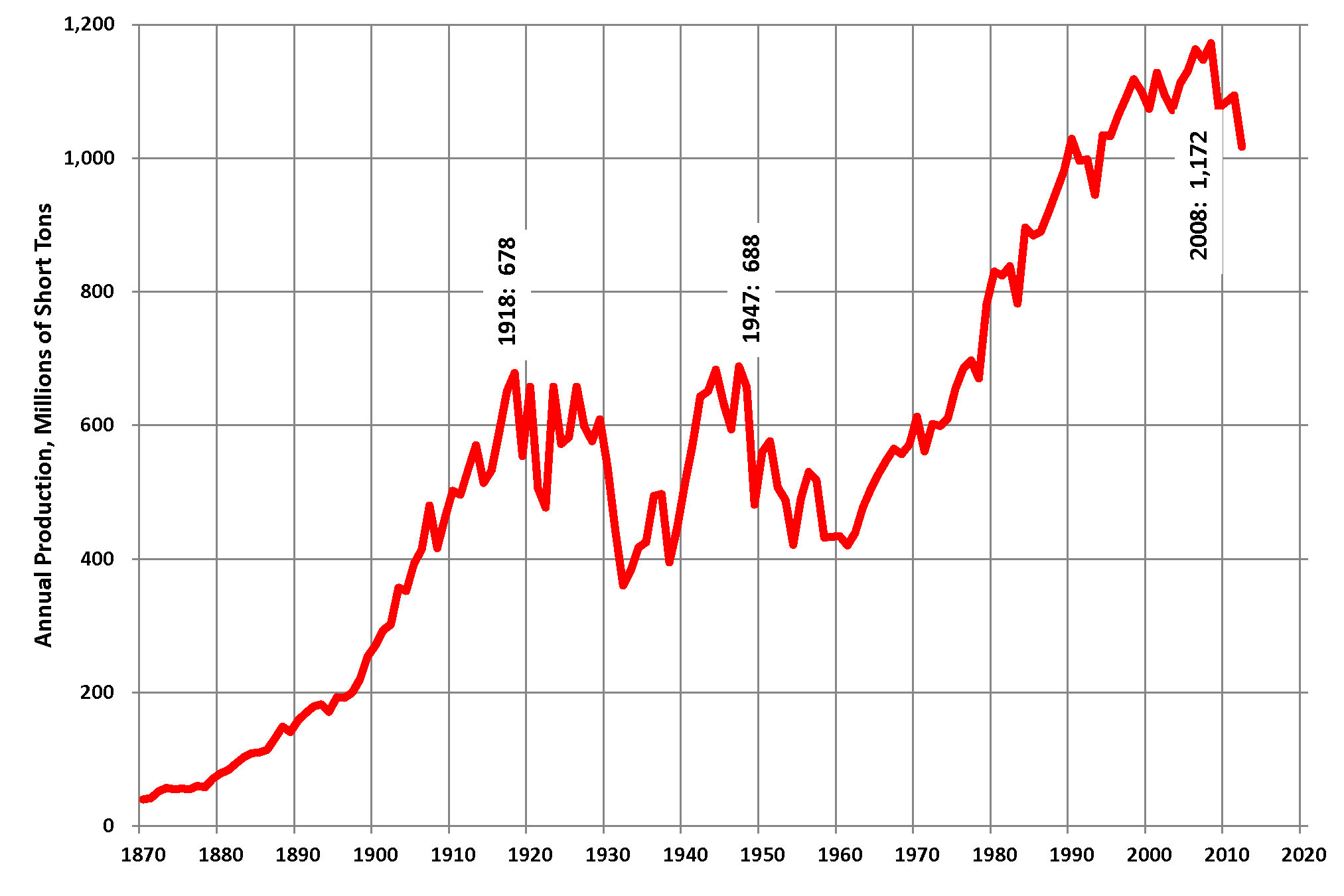
US coal production had major tonnage peaks in 1918, 1947, and 2008.

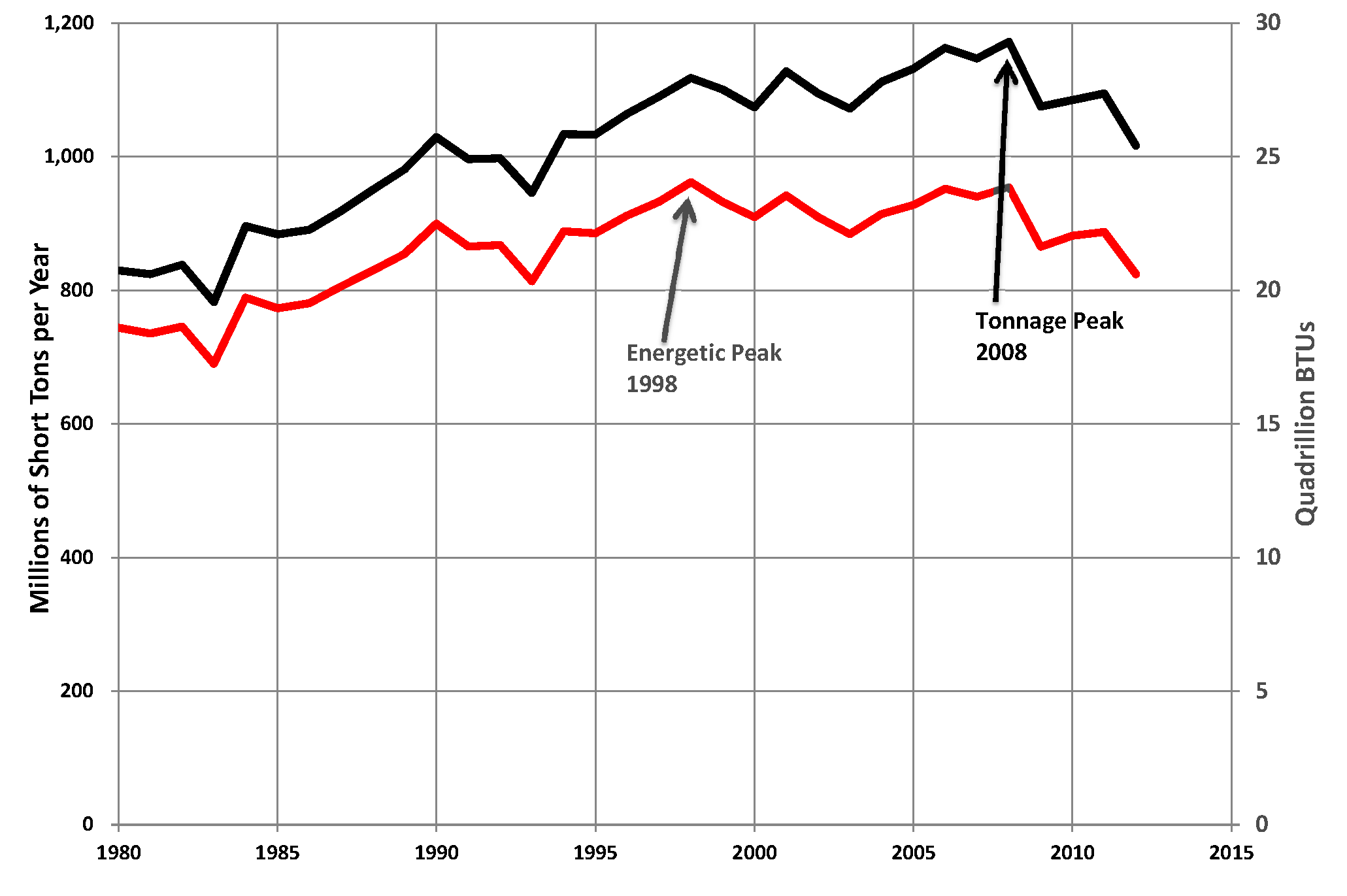
United States annual mined coal tonnage (black) and BTU content (red), 1980–2012, from US EIA

Although Hubbert's analysis in 1956 projected total extraction to peak in about 2150, records show that extraction reached an energy peak in 1998 and a tonnage peak in 2008.

==== Coal mass ====
US coal extraction peaked during World War I, then declined sharply during the depression years of the 1930s. Coal extraction peaked again in the 1940s, then declined during the 1950s. Then coal extraction revived, and was on a nearly continual increasing trend from 1962 to 2008, exceeding the previous peaks. Extraction in 2008 was a record 1.17 billion short tons. High-BTU anthracite coal peaked in 1914; and declined from 44 million tons in 1950 to 1.6 million tons in 2007. Bituminous coal extraction has also been declining since 1990. The gap has been taken up by large increases in subbituminous coal extraction. Comprehensive analysis of historical trends in US coal extraction and reserve estimates, along with a possible future outlook, was published in scientific journals on coal geology in 2009.

In 1956, Hubbert estimated that US coal extraction would peak in about the year 2150. In 2004, Gregson Vaux used the Hubbert model to predict peak US coal extraction in 2032. In 2014, a model published in the International Journal of Coal Geology forecast a U.S. raw tonnage peak from between 2009 and 2023, with the most likely year of the peak in 2010.

==== Energetic peak ====
Over the years, the average energy content per ton of coal mined in the US has declined as mining shifts to coals of lower rank. Although the tonnage of coal mined in the United States reached its latest peak in 2008, the peak in terms of coal energy content occurred in 1998, at 598 Millions of metric tons of oil equivalent (Mtoe); by 2005 this had fallen to 576 Mtoe, or about 4% lower.

=== Australia ===
Australia has substantial coal resources, mostly brown coal. It is responsible for almost 40% of global coal exports worldwide, and much of its current electricity is generated from coal-fired power stations. There are tentative plans to very slowly phase out coal electricity generation in favor of gas, although these plans are still a topic of much debate in Australian politics. Groups such as the Australian Greens, suggest that coal be left in the ground to avoid its potential combustion either in Australia or in importer nations.

Because most of the country's coal is exported it is vulnerable to reductions by importing countries such as China.

=== Indonesia ===
Indonesia is the world's biggest thermal coal exporter.

Government policy is unclear.

=== Turkey ===
Production peaked in 2018 at just over 100 million tonnes.

=== United Kingdom ===
Coal output peaked in 1913 in Britain at 287 Mt and now accounts for less than one percent of world coal extraction. 2007 extraction was around 15 Mt. In 2024 the United Kingdom stopped using coal to generate electricity and the last coal-fired power station was shut down.

=== Canada ===
According to the Earth Watch Group, Canadian coal extraction peaked in 1997.

=== Germany ===
Germany hit peak hard coal extraction in 1958 at 150 million tons. In 2005, hard coal extraction was around 25 million tons. Total coal extraction peaked in 1985 at 578 million short tons, declined sharply in the early 1990s following German reunification, and has been nearly steady since 1999. Total coal extraction in 2005 was 229 million short tons, four percent of total world extraction.

== World peak coal ==
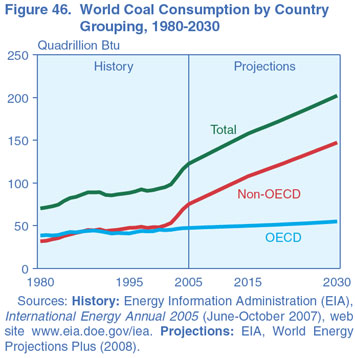

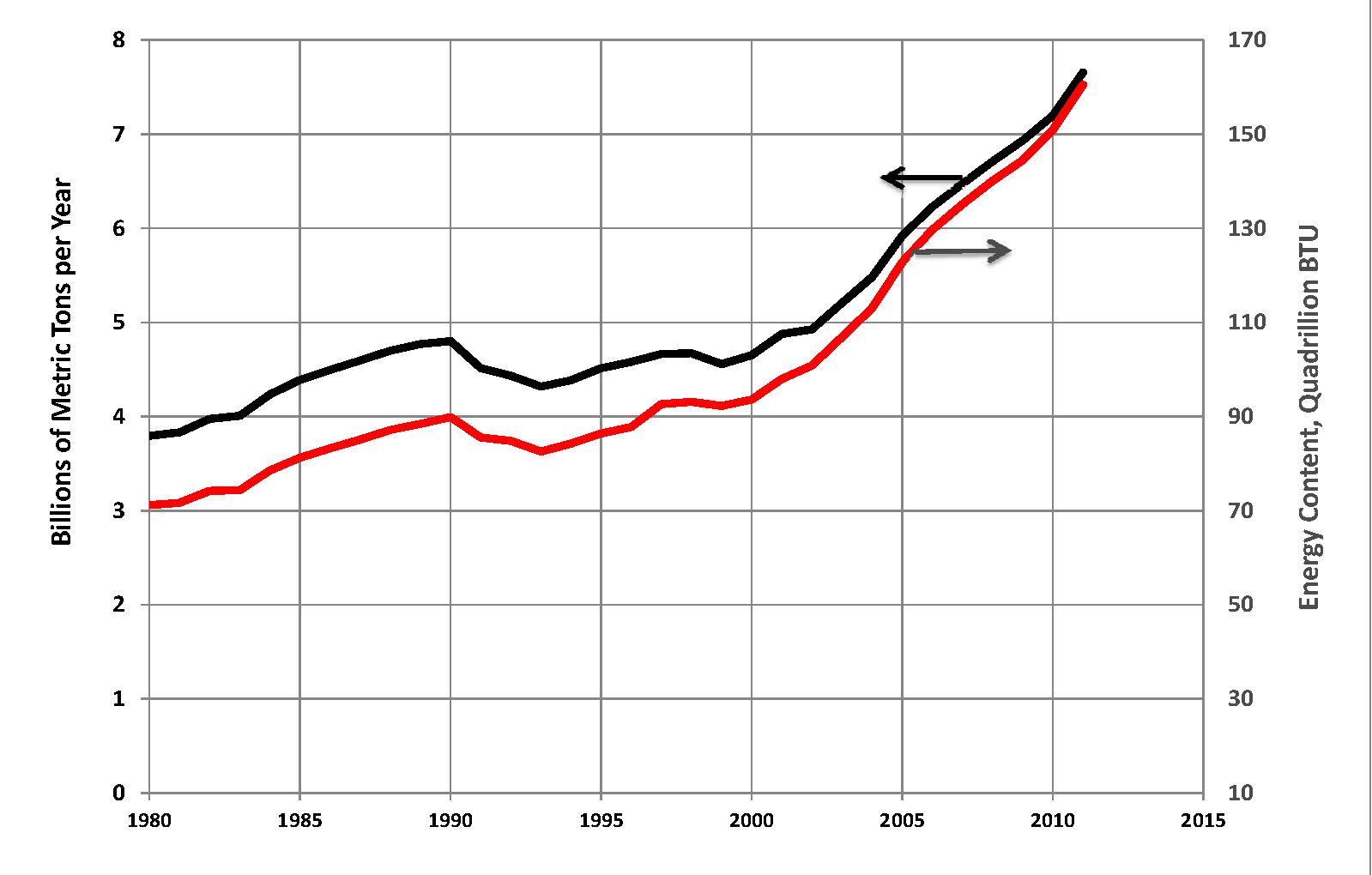
World coal production in tonnage (black) and BTU content (red), 1980–2011; data from US EIA

=== 2011 Patzek and Croft ===
In 2010, Tadeusz Patzek (chairman of the Department of Petroleum and Geosystems Engineering at the University of Texas at Austin) and Greg Croft, predicted that coal production would peak in 2011 or shortly thereafter, and decline so quickly as to nearly eliminate the contribution of coal to climate change. Patzek said: "Our ability to produce this resource at 8 billion tons per year, in my mind, is a dream," However, world coal production exceeded 8 billion tons per year in 2012 (8.2 billion), 2013 (8.19 billion), 2014 (8.085 billion), 2022 (8.3 billion), and 2023 (8.5 billion).

=== 2150 M. King Hubbert ===
M. King Hubbert's 1956 projections from the world extraction curve estimated that world coal production would peak at approximately six billion metric tons per year at about the year 2150.

=== 2020 Energy Watch Group ===
Coal: Resources and Future Production, published in 2007 by the Energy Watch Group (EWG) found that global coal extraction could peak in as few as 15 years. However, the graphs in their 2013 report show a peak in 2020. Reporting on this, Richard Heinberg also noted that the date of peak annual energetic extraction from coal would likely come earlier than the date of peak in quantity of coal (tons per year) extracted as the most energy-dense types of coal had been mined most extensively.

=== Institute for Energy ===
The Future of Coal by B. Kavalov and S. D. Peteves of the Institute for Energy (IFE), prepared for European Commission Joint Research Centre, reached conclusions similar to those of Energy Watch Group, and stated that "coal might not be so abundant, widely available and reliable as an energy source in the future". Kavalov and Peteves did not attempt to forecast a peak in extraction.

=== US Energy Information Administration ===
In 2011 the US Energy Information Administration projected world coal consumption to increase through 2035.

== Hubbert's theory ==
According to M. King Hubbert's Hubbert peak theory, peak coal is the point at which the maximum global coal production rate is reached, after which, according to the theory, the rate of production will enter a terminal decline. Coal is a fossil fuel formed from plant matter over the course of millions of years. It is a finite resource and thus considered to be a non-renewable energy source.

There are two different possible peaks: one measured by mass (i.e. metric tons) and another by energy output (i.e. petajoules). The world average heat content per mass of mined coal rose from 8,020 BTU/lb. in 1989 to 9,060 BTU/lb. in 1999. Since 1999, the world average heat content of mined coal has been fairly steady, and was 9,030 BTU/lb. in 2011.

Hubbert concluded that each oil region and nation has a bell-shaped depletion curve. However, this question was originally raised by William Stanley Jevons in his book The Coal Question in 1865.

Hubbert noted that United States coal extraction grew exponentially at a steady 6.6% per year from 1850 to 1910. Then the growth leveled off. He concluded that no finite resource could sustain exponential growth. At some point, the rate of extraction will have to peak and then decline until the resource is exhausted. He theorized that extraction rate plotted versus time would show a bell-shaped curve, declining as rapidly as it had risen. Hubbert used his observation of the US coal extraction to predict the behavior of peak oil.

The Hubbert linearization using yearly production rates has weaknesses for peak coal calculation, as the signal-to-noise ratio is inferior with coal mining data compared to oil extraction. As a consequence, Rutledge uses cumulative production for linearization. By this method the estimated ultimate recovery results in a stable fit for active coal regions. The ultimate production for world coal is estimated to be 680 Gt, of which 309 Gt have already been produced. However, in 2015 the World Coal Association reported that two different estimates of coal reserves remaining were 968 Gt (IEA/BGR) and 891 Gt (BP/WEC).

== See also ==
- Coal phase-out
- Peak gas
- Peak oil
- Peak uranium
- Peak water
