= List of countries by coal reserves =

The reserve list specifies different types of coal and includes countries with at least 0.1% share of the estimated world's proven reserves of coal. All data are taken from the German Federal Institute for Geosciences and Natural Resources (BGR) via BP; all numbers are in million tonnes. However BP no longer publishes coal reserves and the Energy Institute has not updated the figures since 2020.

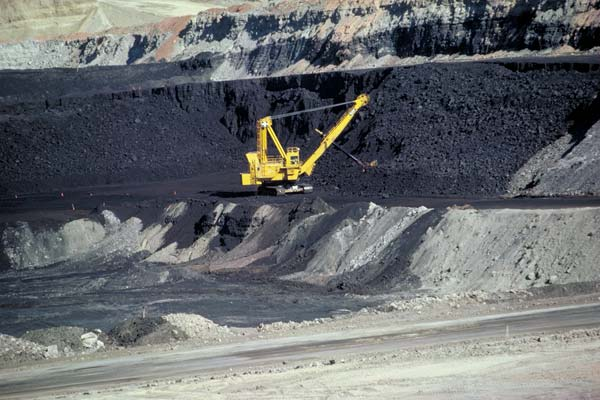
A coal mine in Wyoming, United States. The country has the world's largest coal reserves.

== Background ==
Coal is a combustible black or brownish-black sedimentary rock, formed as rock strata called coal seams. Coal is mostly carbon with variable amounts of other elements; chiefly hydrogen, sulfur, oxygen, and nitrogen.

As a fossil fuel burned for heat, coal supplies about a quarter of the world's primary energy and two-fifths of its electricity.

The largest consumer and importer of coal is China. China mines almost half the world's coal, followed by India with about a tenth. Australia accounts for about a third of world coal exports, followed by Indonesia and Russia.

Coal is largely held in the Earth in areas that it needs to be mined from, and is generally present in coal seams.

=== Estimation of proved reserves ===
Unlike "resources", which is the amount that could technically be extracted, according to BP in 2019 "total proved reserves of coal" is "generally taken to be those quantities that geological and engineering information indicates with reasonable certainty can be recovered in the future from known reservoirs under existing economic and operating conditions". Thus, like oil reserves, coal reserves can vary with coal and carbon prices. There are various definitions of "reserve".

Unlike the internationally traded commodities hard or soft coal, lignite is not traded far from the place where it is mined because of its low value relative to transport costs, so it does not have a national price. For example lignite costs within India vary greatly.

The IEA does not define “reserve” or proven reserves for coal, only for oil and gas. However the EIA defines US “recoverable coal reserves”.

== List (2023) ==
List of countries by coal reserves (2023)
Country	Short tons (millions)
United States	273,244
Russia	178,757
China	173,108
Australia	164,764
India	140,795
Germany	39,022
Indonesia	38,641
Ukraine	37,892
Kyrgyzstan	31,415
Poland	30,598
Kazakhstan	28,225
Turkey	12,098
North Korea	11,684
South Africa	10,905
Serbia	7,840
New Zealand	7,441
Brazil	7,271
Canada	7,255
Eswatini	5,119
Colombia	5,020
Belgium	4,519
Tajikistan	4,492
Czech Republic	3,963
Bangladesh	3,594
Netherlands	3,579
Vietnam	3,435
Greece	3,170
Pakistan	3,149
Hungary	2,902
Mongolia	2,778
Bosnia and Herzegovina	2,496
Bulgaria	2,396
Nigeria	2,363
Mozambique	1,975
Botswana	1,830
Peru	1,727
Kosovo	1,724
Tanzania	1,554
Uzbekistan	1,516
Iran	1,326
Spain	1,308
Chile	1,302
Mexico	1,279
Thailand	1,172
DR Congo	1,089
Zambia	1,042
Georgia	993
Malawi	884
Argentina	882
Turkmenistan	882
Uganda	882
Venezuela	806
Italy	672
Albania	575
Zimbabwe	553
Greenland	422
Philippines	398
Japan	386
Namibia	386
Montenegro	371
North Macedonia	366
South Korea	359
Armenia	349
Romania	321
Myanmar	278
Malaysia	249
Algeria	246
Egypt	201
France	176
Madagascar	165
Morocco	106
Slovenia	105
Niger	99
Afghanistan	73
Laos	68
Ireland	44
United Kingdom	29
Ecuador	26
Slovakia	21
Nepal	9
Sweden	6
Central African Republic	3
Portugal	3
New Caledonia	2
Norway	2
Bolivia	1
Taiwan	1

== List (2018) ==
Country	Anthracite & bituminous		Subbituminous & lignite		Total	
Country	Tonnes (mil)	%	Tonnes (mil)	%	Tonnes (mil)	%
United States	220,167	30%	30,052	9.4%	250,219	24%
Russia	69,634	9.5%	90,730	28.4%	160,364	15%
Australia	70,927	9.7%	76,508	23.9%	147,435	14%
China	130,851	17.8%	7,968	2.5%	138,819	13%
India	96,468	13.1%	4,895	1.5%	101,363	10%
Indonesia	26,122	3.6%	10,878	3.4%	37,000	4%
Germany	3	0%	36,100	11.3%	36,103	3%
Ukraine	32,039	4.4%	2,336	0.7%	34,375	3%
Poland	20,542	2.8%	5,937	1.9%	26,479	3%
Kazakhstan	25,605	3.5%	0	0%	25,605	2%
Turkey	551	0.1%	10,975	3.4%	11,526	1%
South Africa	9,893	1.3%	0	0%	9,893	1%
Mongolia	6,400	0.9%	1,350	0.4%	7,750	1%
New Zealand	825	0.1%	6,750	2.1%	7,575	1%
Serbia	402	0.1%	7,112	2.2%	7,514	1%
Brazil	1,547	0.2%	5,049	1.6%	6,596	1%
Canada	4,346	0.6%	2,236	0.7%	6,582	1%
Colombia	4,881	0.7%	0	0%	4,881	0%
Vietnam	3,116	0.4%	244	0.1%	3,360	0%
Pakistan	207	0%	2,857	0.9%	3,064	0%
Hungary	276	0%	2,633	0.8%	2,909	0%
Greece	0	0%	2,876	0.9%	2,876	0%
Czech Republic	110	0%	2,547	0.8%	2,657	0%
Bulgaria	192	0%	2,174	0.7%	2,366	0%
Uzbekistan	1,375	0.2%	0	0%	1,375	0%
Mexico	1,160	0.2%	51	0%	1,211	0%
Spain	868	0.1%	319	0.1%	1,187	0%
Thailand	0	0%	1,063	0.3%	1,063	0%
Venezuela	731	0.1%	0	0%	731	0%
World	734,903	100%	319,879	100%	1,054,782	100%

== See also ==
- List of countries by coal production
- World energy supply and consumption
- World energy resources
- Estimated ultimate recovery
- Proven reserves
