= List of countries by coal production =

Coal production by region

This is a list of countries by coal production ranking countries with coal production as of 2024. It includes all countries with a production of at least 2 million metric tonnes.

== 2020s ==
Coal production (million tonnes) (2020s)
Country	2024	2023	2022	2021	2020
China	4,402.5	4,362.1	4,152.7	4,126.0	3,901.6
India	1,012.9	968.8	863.2	766.5	719.8
Indonesia	836.0	781.3	693.4	614.0	563.7
Russia	476.2	479.9	461.3	435.3	401.4
Australia	467.7	442.9	463.6	467.1	499.8
United States	464.9	524.0	538.5	523.8	485.7
South Africa	237.4	238.0	244.3	235.7	247.1
Kazakhstan	112.9	117.7	114.9	83.8	96.1
Germany	91.9	102.3	130.8	126.3	107.4
Poland	85.2	88.7	108.2	107.4	100.4
Mongolia	82.6	64.7	29.7	25.3	35.1
Turkey	78.9	78.5	84.0	85.6	74.7
Colombia	58.1	49.4	57.7	60.8	53.8
Canada	48.6	48.6	41.1	47.5	45.3
Vietnam	44.6	47.4	43.6	47.8	43.9
Serbia	31.2	33.2	35.1	36.4	39.7
Czech Republic	25.0	30.0	35.1	31.5	31.6
North Korea	23.0	21.9	21.7	21.0	25.6
Ukraine	19.7	16.4	17.0	24.9	24.4
Laos	18.0	16.6	14.8	14.3	14.7
Mozambique	16.2	10.6	9.0	10.6	7.4
Pakistan	15.0	13.8	12.7	8.4	8.7
Bulgaria	14.9	21.0	35.5	28.3	22.3
Philippines	14.9	14.5	14.5	14.4	13.3
Thailand	12.8	12.8	13.6	14.2	13.3
Romania	12.6	14.8	18.2	17.7	15.0
Bosnia and Herzegovina	11.8	11.7	13.3	6.7	6.2
Kosovo	8.1	6.9	9.1	8.5	8.4
Greece	6.3	10.5	13.7	12.1	14.1
Brazil	6.1	6.6	6.2	6.7	5.6
Mexico	5.7	5.7	5.9	6.0	8.8
Uzbekistan	5.3	6.4	5.4	5.1	4.1
Kyrgyzstan	4.4	3.7	3.6	2.0	2.7
Hungary	3.9	6.1	6.8	7.9	8.0
Malaysia	3.3	3.6	3.7	3.1	3.2
North Macedonia	3.2	4.0	5.5	5.5	5.6
Myanmar	2.7	1.0	1.3	1.6	2.0
New Zealand	2.5	2.6	2.6	2.9	2.8
Botswana	2.5	2.2	2.6	2.0	1.9
Tajikistan	2.4	2.4	2.1	2.1	2.1
Slovenia	2.2	2.4	2.4	2.6	3.2
Zambia	2.0	2.0	0.8	1.1	1.1
World	8,797.2	8,694.9	8,360.4	8,065.3	7,687.1

== 2010s ==
Country	2019	2018	2017	2016	2015	2014	2013
China	3,846.3	3,697.7	3,523.2	3,411.0	3,747.0	3,874.0	3,974.3
India	730.3	715.4	671.0	653.2	631.7	598.3	563.4
United States	640.8	686.0	702.3	660.6	812.8	906.9	893.4
Indonesia	616.2	557.8	461.0	434.0	392.0	458.0	474.6
Australia	511.7	502.0	481.3	492.8	484.5	503.2	472.8
Russia	437.0	441.6	411.2	385.4	373.3	357.6	355.2
South Africa	257.9	250.0	252.3	251.2	252.1	260.5	256.3
Germany	131.3	168.8	175.1	176.1	183.3	185.8	190.6
Poland	112.0	122.4	127.1	131.1	135.5	137.1	142.9
Kazakhstan	97.5	100.5	101.4	103.1	107.3	114.0	119.6
Colombia	87.5	86.5	92.4	92.2	87.1	90.1	87.1
Turkey	87.1	83.9	99.8	70.6	58.4	65.2	60.4
Canada	53.2	55.0	59.5	60.3	60.7	68.8	68.4
Vietnam	45.7	42.4	38.1	39.4	41.5	41.2	41.1
Mongolia	43.1	43.2	39.9	33.5	23.6	19.1	17.2
Czech Republic	40.9	43.8	44.9	46.0	46.2	46.9	49.0
Serbia	38.9	37.7	40.0	38.4	38.1	29.8	40.3
Bulgaria	28.0	30.9	34.5	31.5	35.9	31.3	28.6
Greece	27.4	36.5	37.8	33.1	47.7	49.3	53.9
North Korea	27.2	24.3	29.1	33.1	30.2	31.0	30.4
Ukraine	26.1	26.8	34.2	41.8	38.5	60.9	84.8
Romania	21.7	23.7	25.7	23.2	25.5	23.6	24.7
Laos	15.4	17.7	14.9	14.6	5.3	1.3	1.1
Philippines	15.3	14.4	13.1	12.3	7.8	10.5	7.8
Thailand	14.1	14.9	16.3	17.0	15.2	18.0	18.1
Mozambique	10.9	17.5	16.6	7.8	7.2	15.8	6.7
Mexico	8.9	10.9	11.8	12.6	10.7	15.4	15.2
Pakistan	8.7	4.4	4.0	3.3	3.4	3.0	3.0
Kosovo	8.1	8.5	8.4	9.7	9.1	7.9	9.1
Hungary	6.8	7.9	8.0	9.2	9.3	9.6	9.6
Bosnia and Herzegovina	6.6	7.0	7.1	6.5	6.0	6.2	6.2
North Macedonia	5.5	5.0	5.1	5.2	5.9	6.5	6.7
Brazil	5.4	6.4	7.0	8.1	8.0	7.9	8.6
Uzbekistan	4.0	4.2	4.0	3.9	3.5	4.4	4.1
Malaysia	3.5	2.7	3.0	2.3	2.6	2.6	2.9
Slovenia	3.1	3.2	3.4	3.3	3.2	3.1	3.9
New Zealand	3.0	3.2	2.9	2.9	3.4	4.0	4.6
Afghanistan	3.0	2.8	2.1	2.3	2.1	2.3	1.8
Nigeria	2.7	2.7	2.3	2.7	2.5	2.4	2.4
Zimbabwe	2.6	3.3	3.0	3.7	4.3	5.8	3.1
Kyrgyzstan	2.6	2.4	1.9	1.9	1.8	1.8	1.4
United Kingdom	2.6	2.7	3.0	4.2	8.6	11.6	12.7
Myanmar	2.1	1.3	0.7	0.5	0.5	0.6	0.6
Botswana	2.1	2.2	2.2	1.9	2.1	1.7	1.5
Tajikistan	2.0	1.9	1.8	1.4	1.0	0.9	0.5
Spain	–	2.4	3.0	2.0	3.1	3.9	4.4
World	8,059.1	7,922.7	7,628.8	7,418.7	7,899.5	8,083.6	8,155.4

== Older ==
The following table lists all countries that produced at least 100 million metric tonnes in any of those years.

Country	2010	2000	1990	1980
China	3,428.4	1,384.2	1,079.3	620.1
United States	983.7	973.9	933.6	752.7
India	524.5	329.1	214.4	110.2
Australia	441.2	307.5	205.3	104.5
Indonesia	360.5	85.0	11.9	0.6
Russia	298.7	240.3	–	–
South Africa	254.7	224.9	171.9	115.1
Germany	183.5	205.1	–	–
Poland	132.7	161.7	214.1	229.9
Kazakhstan	110.9	74.9	–	–
USSR	–	–	711.0	716.0
East Germany	–	–	260.4	290.5
West Germany	–	–	173.6	193.7
Czechoslovakia	–	–	106.1	124.5
United Kingdom	18.3	31.2	92.8	130.1
World	7,438.3	4,654.7	4,701.8	3,767.3
