= Tutupan coal mine =

Coal mine in Indonesia

Tutupan Coal Mine
- Location: South Kalimantan, Indonesia
- Products: Coking coal
- Company: Adaro Energy

The Tutupan Coal Mine is a coal mine located in South Kalimantan. The mine has coal reserves amounting to 3 billion tonnes of coking coal, one of the largest coal reserves in Asia and the world. The mine has an annual production capacity of 41 million tonnes of coal.

== See also ==
- Paringin coal mine - part of the same mine complex
- Wara coal mine - part of the same mine complex
