= Paringin coal mine =

Coal mine in Indonesia

Paringin Coal Mine
- Location: South Kalimantan, Indonesia
- Products: Coking coal
- Company: Adaro Energy

The Paringin Coal Mine is a coal mine located in South Kalimantan. The mine has coal reserves amounting to 300 million tonnes of coking coal, one of the largest coal reserves in Asia and the world. The mine has an annual production capacity of 1 million tonnes of coal.

== See also ==
- Wara coal mine - part of the same mine complex
- Tutupan coal mine - part of the same mine complex
