= Wara coal mine =

Coal mine in Indonesia

Wara Coal Mine
- Location: South Kalimantan, Indonesia
- Products: Coking coal

The Wara Coal Mine is a coal mine located in South Kalimantan, Indonesia. The mine has coal reserves amounting to 2.06 billion tonnes of coking coal, one of the largest coal reserves in Asia and the world. The mine has an annual production capacity of 5 million tonnes of coal.

== See also ==
- Paringin coal mine - part of the same mine complex
- Tutupan coal mine - part of the same mine complex
