= Mentarang Induk Hydroelectric Power Plant =

Hydroelectric power plant in Malinau, North Kalimantan, Indonesia

- Location in Kalimantan, Indonesia Mentarang Induk Hydroelectric Power Plant (Indonesia)
- Official name: Pembangkit Listrik Tenaga Air Mentarang Induk
- Country: Indonesia
- Location: Malinau Regency, North Kalimantan
- Coordinates: 3.6°N 116.2°E
- Purpose: Power generation
- Status: Under construction
- Construction began: 2023
- Opening date: 2029 (expected)
- Construction cost: US$2.6–3.2 billion (estimated)
- Owner: PT Kayan Hydropower Nusantara

Dam and spillways
- Impounds: Mentarang River

Power Station
- Turbines: Hydropower, reservoir-regulated run-of-river
- Installed capacity: 1,375 MW

Mentarang Induk Hydroelectric Power Plant (Indonesian: Pembangkit Listrik Tenaga Air Mentarang Induk), commonly abbreviated as MIHEP, is a 1,375 MW hydroelectric power project under development on the Mentarang River in Malinau Regency, North Kalimantan, Indonesia. The project is being developed by PT Kayan Hydropower Nusantara (KHN), a joint venture owned by AlamTri Resources (50%), Sarawak Energy (25%), and PT Kayan Patria Pratama (25).

MIHEP is intended to provide renewable baseload electricity primarily to the KIPI Tanah Kuning, one of Indonesia's largest industrial development zones focusing on green metals, nickel processing, and aluminium smelting.

== Background ==
North Kalimantan has been identified as one of Indonesia's richest hydropower regions, with potential exceeding 9 GW across the Kayan and Mentarang river basins. Development of MIHEP accelerated after the Indonesian government prioritized KIPI as a strategic national project requiring long-term renewable power supply.

== Project Description ==
The project has an installed capacity of 1,375 MW and will use a combination of dam and reservoir-regulated run-of-river hydropower. Major project components include:

- Main dam and diversion tunnel
- Powerhouse complex
- High-voltage 275–500 kV transmission line to KIPI
- Access roads and auxiliary civil works

Estimated annual electricity generation is 8–9 TWh, depending on hydrological conditions.

== Developers and Ownership ==
As of 2025, ownership of PT Kayan Hydropower Nusantara is as follows:

- 50% – PT Alamtri Resources Indonesia Tbk (ADRO)
- 25% – Sarawak Energy Berhad
- 25% – PT Kayan Patria Pratama

Early development previously involved Sarang Energy Group, though ownership shifted as new investors joined.

== Construction ==
A ceremonial groundbreaking was held on 1 March 2023. Initial works, including access road preparation, began in 2023–2024.

The developer is targeting financial close in 2026, after which full EPC construction is expected to accelerate. Commercial operation is expected around 2029–2030, subject to financing and regulatory processes.

== Purpose and Industrial Integration ==
The project is one of the primary renewable energy sources planned for the KIPI Tanah Kuning industrial zone, which will host:

- Nickel matte, HPAL, and ferronickel facilities
- Aluminium smelters
- EV battery component manufacturing
- Potential green hydrogen and ammonia production

Supplying these industries with renewable hydropower supports Indonesia's ambition to produce “green metals” for export markets.

== Environmental and Social Impact ==
MIHEP is subject to Indonesia's AMDAL environmental assessment requirements. Mitigation measures include watershed management, biodiversity surveys, sediment control, and engagement with nearby communities in Malinau Regency.

== See also ==
- Kalimantan Industrial Park Indonesia
- Hydropower in Indonesia
- Kayan River
- Adaro Energy
- Sarawak Energy
