= Coal in Germany =

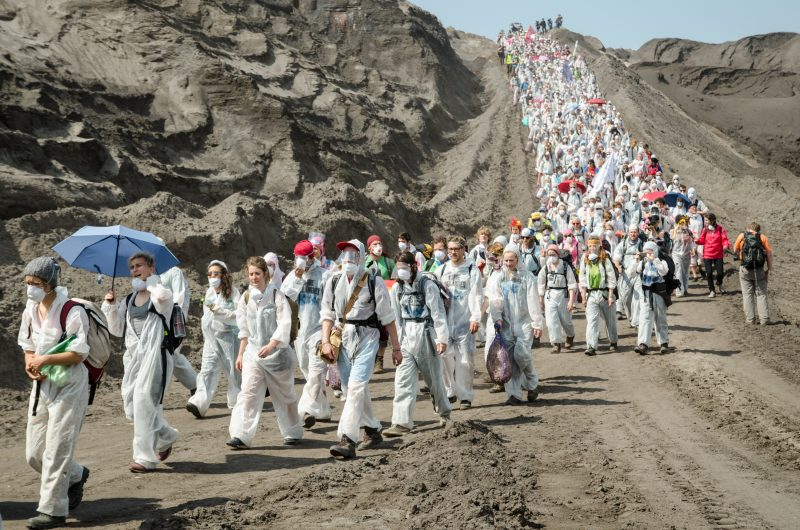
3500–4000 environmental activists blocking a coal mine to limit climate change (Ende Gelände 2016).

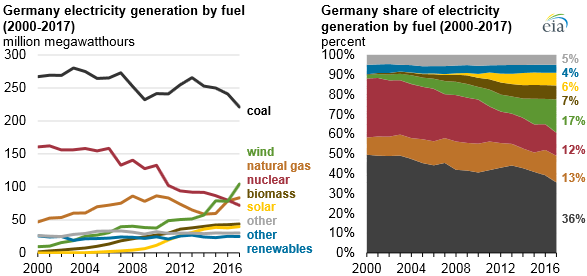
German electricity generation by source, 2000–2017.

Coal contributed greatly to the industrialisation of Germany. Air pollution from burning coal is estimated to cause tens of deaths per Twh of electricity generated, many more than other power sources such as gas or nuclear and totalling many thousands of deaths in the 21st century. Coal power phase-out in Germany is in progress and supposed to be complete by 2038.

== History ==
Anthracite mining has long been subsidized in Germany, reaching a peak of €6.7 billion in 1996 and dropping to €2.7 billion in 2005 due to falling output. These subsidies represented a burden on public finances and implied a substantial opportunity cost, diverting funds away from other, more beneficial public investments.

In February 2007, Germany announced plans to phase out hard coal-industry subsidies by 2018, a move which ended hard coal mining in Germany. This exit was later than the EU-mandated end by 2014. Solar and wind are major sources of energy and renewable energy generation, around 15% as of December 2013, and growing.

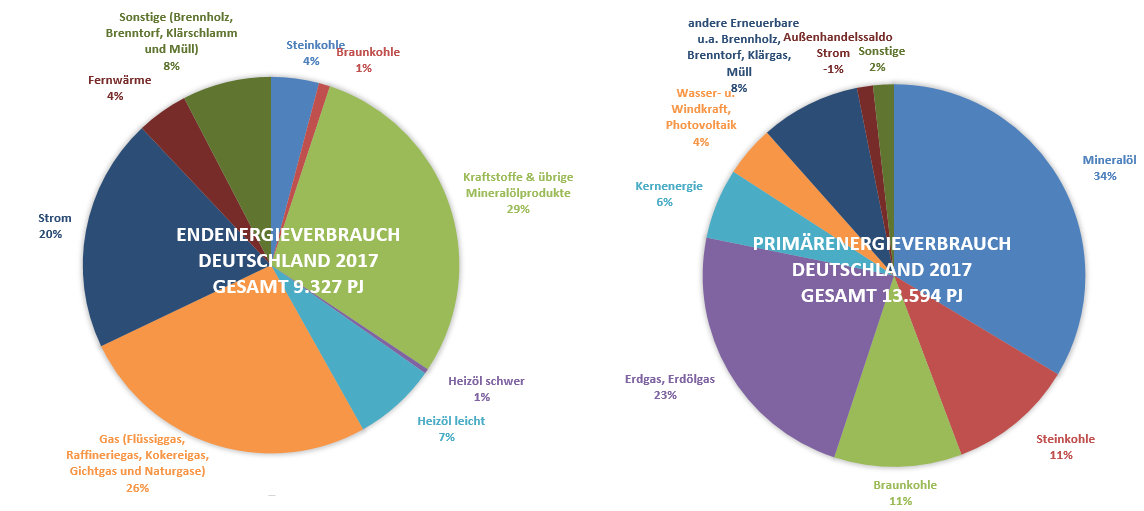
Consumpion of primary energy and energy carrier in Germany (2017).

Electricity mix in Germany (black = bituminous coal, brown = lignite).

In 2007, German Chancellor Angela Merkel and the First Merkel cabinet (CDU/CSU and SPD) agreed to legislation to phase out Germany's hard coal mining sector. That did not mean that they supported phasing out coal in general. There were plans to build about 25 new plants in the coming years. Most German coal power plants were built in the 1960s, and have a low energy efficiency. Public sentiment against coal power plants was growing and the construction or planning of some plants was stopped. A number are under construction and still being built. No concrete plan is in place to reduce coal-fired electricity generation. As of October 2015, the remaining coal plants still under planning include: Niederaussem, Profen, and Stade. The coal plants then under construction included: Mannheim and Kraftwerk Datteln IV (it started 30 May 2020). Between 2012 and 2015, six new plants went online. All of these plants are 600–1800 MW_{e}.

In 2014, Germany's coal consumption dropped for the first time, having risen each year since the low during the Great Recession.

A 2014 study found that coal is not making a comeback in Germany, as is sometimes claimed. Rather renewables have more than offset the nuclear facilities that have been shut down as a result of Germany's nuclear power phase-out (Atomausstieg). Hard coal plants now face financial stringency as their operating hours are cut back by the market. But in contrast, lignite-fired generation is in a safe position until the mid-2020s unless government policies change. To phase-out coal, Germany should seek to strength the emissions trading system (EU-ETS), consider a carbon tax, promote energy efficiency, and strengthen the use of natural gas as a bridge fuel.

In 2016, the Third Merkel cabinet and affected lignite power plant operators Mibrag, RWE, and Vattenfall reached an understanding (Verständigung) on the transfer of lignite power plant units into security standby (Überführung von Braunkohlekraftwerksblöcken in die Sicherheitsbereitschaft). As a result, eight lignite-fired power plants are to be mothballed and later closed, with the first plant scheduled to cease operation in October 2016 and the last in October 2019. The affected operators will receive state compensation for foregone profits. The European Commission has declared government plans to use €1.6 billion of public financing for this purpose to be in line with the European Union's rules on state aid.

A 2016 study found that the phase-out of lignite in Lusatia (Lausitz) by 2030 can be financed by future owner EPH in a manner that avoids taxpayer involvement. Instead, liabilities covering decommissioning and land rehabilitation could be paid by EPH directly into a foundation, perhaps run by the public company LMBV. The study calculates the necessary provisions at €2.6 billion.

In November 2016, the German utility STEAG announced it will be decommissioning five coal-fired generating units in North Rhine-Westphalia and Saarland due to low wholesale electricity prices.

A coal phase-out for Germany is implied in Germany's Climate Action Plan 2050, environment minister Barbara Hendricks said in an interview on 21 November 2016. "If you read the Climate Action Plan carefully, you will find that the exit from coal-fired power generation is the immanent consequence of the energy sector target. ... By 2030 ... half of the coal-fired power production must have ended, compared to 2014", she said.

Plans to cut down the ancient Hambach Forest to extend the Hambach surface mine in 2018 have resulted in massive protests. On 5 October 2018 a German court ruled against the further destruction of the forest for mining purposes. The ruling states, the court needs more time to reconsider the complaint. Angela Merkel, the chancellor of Germany, welcomed the court's ruling. The forest is located approximately 29 km west of the city center of Cologne (specifically Cologne Cathedral).

In January 2019 the German Commission on Growth, Structural Change and Employment initiated Germany's plans to entirely phase out and shut down the 84 remaining coal-fired plants on its territory by 2038.

In May 2020, the 1100 MW Datteln 4 coal-fired power plant was added to the German grid after nearly a 10-year delay in construction.

In the first half of 2021, coal was the largest source of power generation in Germany due to less wind than in the years before.

== Phase out ==
As coal is continuously phased-out in Germany, natural gas is increasingly replacing coal-burning power plants. In late 2021, a record-breaking surge in energy prices in Europe, particularly for natural gas and refined petroleum products, put this development into question. While the European Union is gradually cutting down on its dependence on fossil fuels, a shift to a green economy has not happened as swiftly as expected. Since many countries in Europe resort to natural gas in order to build their green economies, elevated prices for natural gas have been viewed as a stumbling block for reducing greenhouse gas emissions.
