= Coal in South Africa =

Coal mining and consumption in South Africa

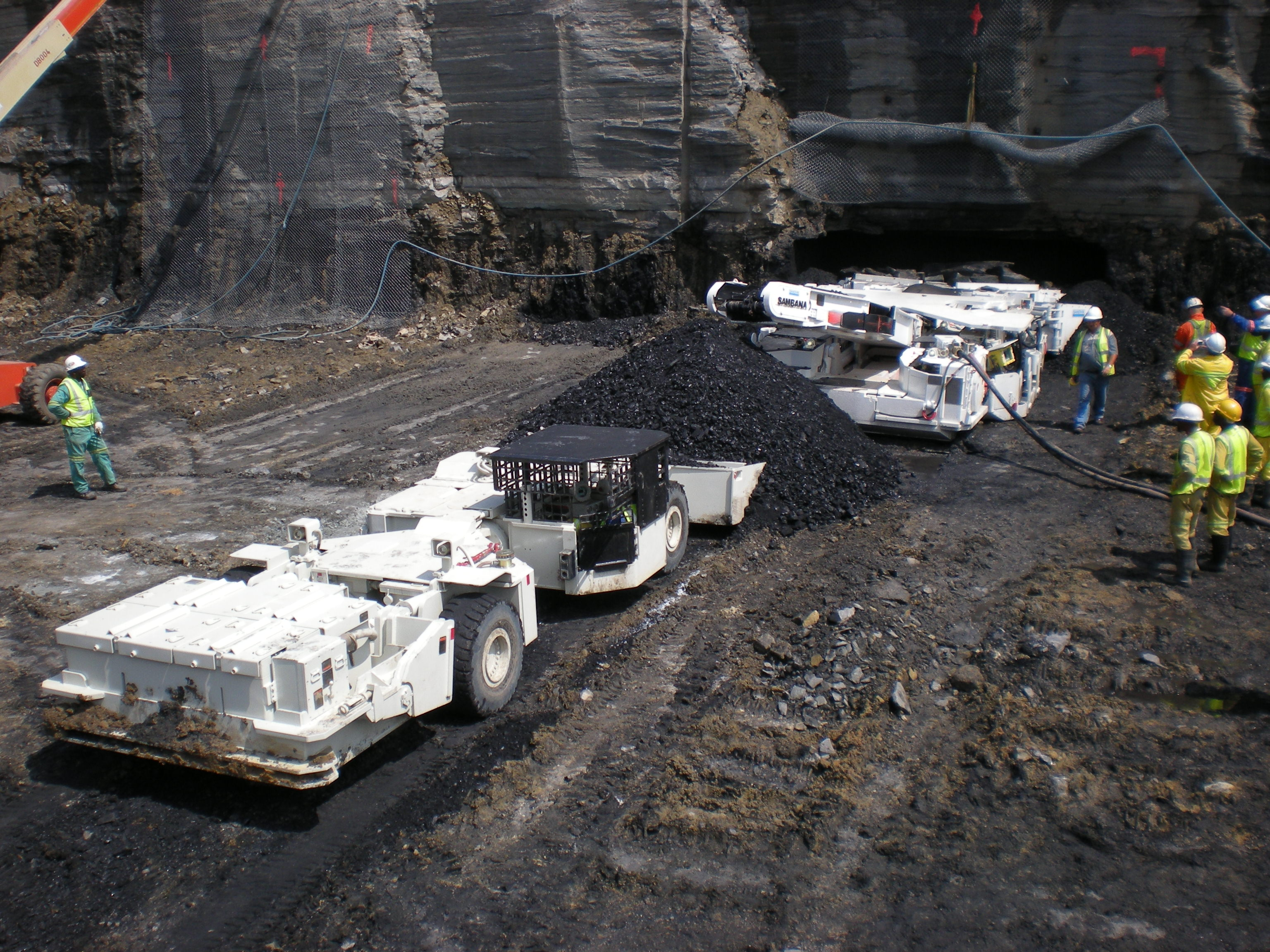
Opencast mining

As of 2011, South Africa produces in excess of 255 million tonnes of coal and consumes almost three-quarters of that domestically. As of 2018, South Africa was the seventh largest producer and consumer of coal in the world. The industry, as of 2015, employed about 80,000 workers, or .5% of total employment, down from a peak in 1981 of 135,000 workers. The coal industry is South Africa's largest contribution to the greenhouse gases that cause climate change.

Around 77% of South Africa's energy needs are directly derived from coal. South Africa is the 5th largest exporter of coal in the world, with 30% consumed overseas. 92% of coal consumed on the African continent is produced in South Africa. 80% of South Africa's CO_{2} emissions come from the energy supply which is dependent on coal, which produced the vast majority of the country's energy, or 42GWs. In negotiations leading up to the COP26 Climate Conference in Glasgow, South Africa and its partner countries reached a $8.5 billion Climate finance package to end its reliance on coal. The use of coal in South Africa dates back to the Iron Age (300–1880 AD), when charcoal (note: not coal, but charred wood) was used to melt iron and copper, but large-scale exploitation of coal did not occur until the mid-19th century.

== Geology ==
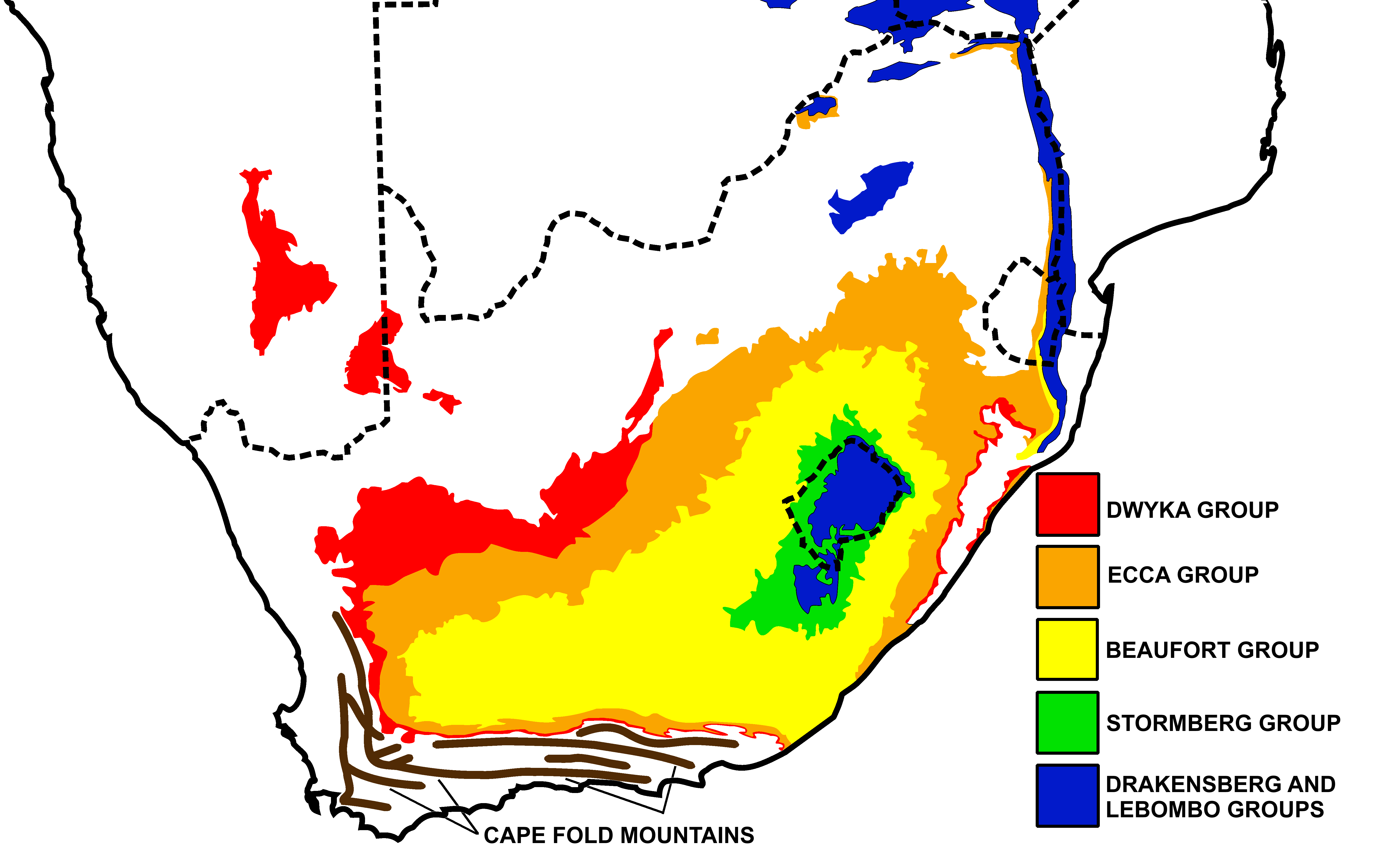
The surface exposure of the rocks belonging to the Karoo Supergroup. South Africa's coal occurs in the Ecca group (coloured mustard yellow). These rocks were deposited in a vast inland lake or sea, when Africa was part of Gondwana. It was only along the northern and north-eastern shores of this body of water where marshes formed peat, and eventually turned into coal.

The largest coal deposits in South Africa are to be found in the Ecca deposits, a stratum of the Karoo Supergroup, dating from the Permian period, between 280 and 250 Ma. The Ecca Group is extensive, covering around two-thirds of South Africa (much of it covered by slightly younger rocks - see diagram on the left). Only the northern and north-eastern portion of these Ecca deposits is coal-bearing, but it nevertheless contains more than a third of all coal reserves in the Southern Hemisphere.

Notable coalfields are:

- Waterberg Coalfield
- Highveld Coalfield
- Witbank Coalfield
- Ermelo Coalfield
- Utrecht Coalfield
- Klip River Coalfield

== Economic impact ==
South Africa is one of the seven largest coal-producing and one of the top five coal-exporting countries in the world.

More than a quarter of coal mined in South Africa is exported, most of which leaves the country via Richards Bay. Coal is South Africa's third largest source of foreign exchange; platinum being the largest and gold second. Around 15% of the country's GDP (2000 estimate) is spent on energy and 77% of that is derived from coal.

In 2004, the coal and lignite mining industry generated a gross income of R39 billion and directly employed 50,000 people.

== Mining ==
The five largest coal mining companies account for around 85% of all production. They are Anglo American plc, South32, Sasol Mining, Glencore Xstrata, and Exxaro .

Open-pit mining account for roughly half of South African coal mining operations, the other half being sub-surface.

== Coal consumption ==
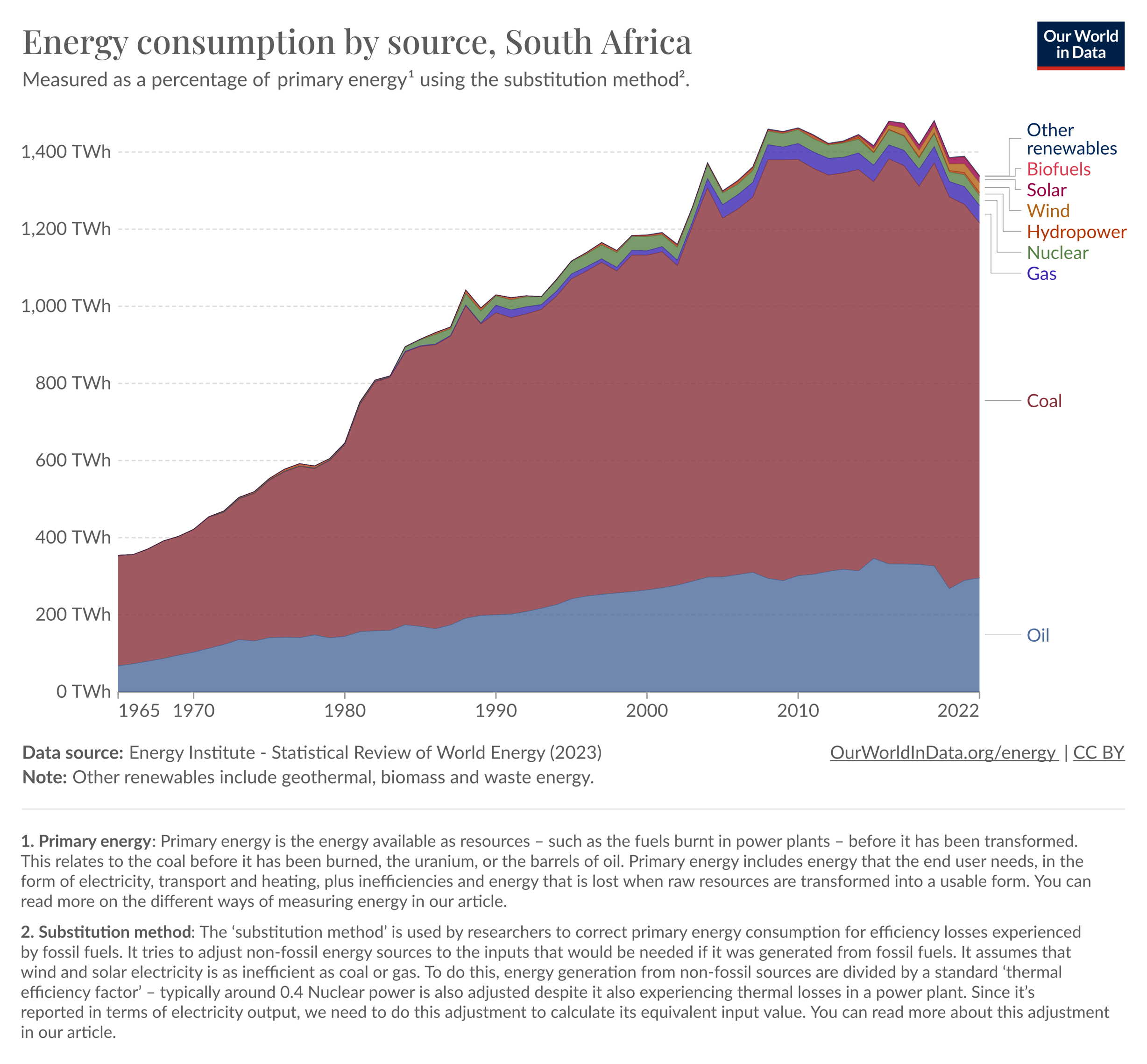

=== Electricity generation ===
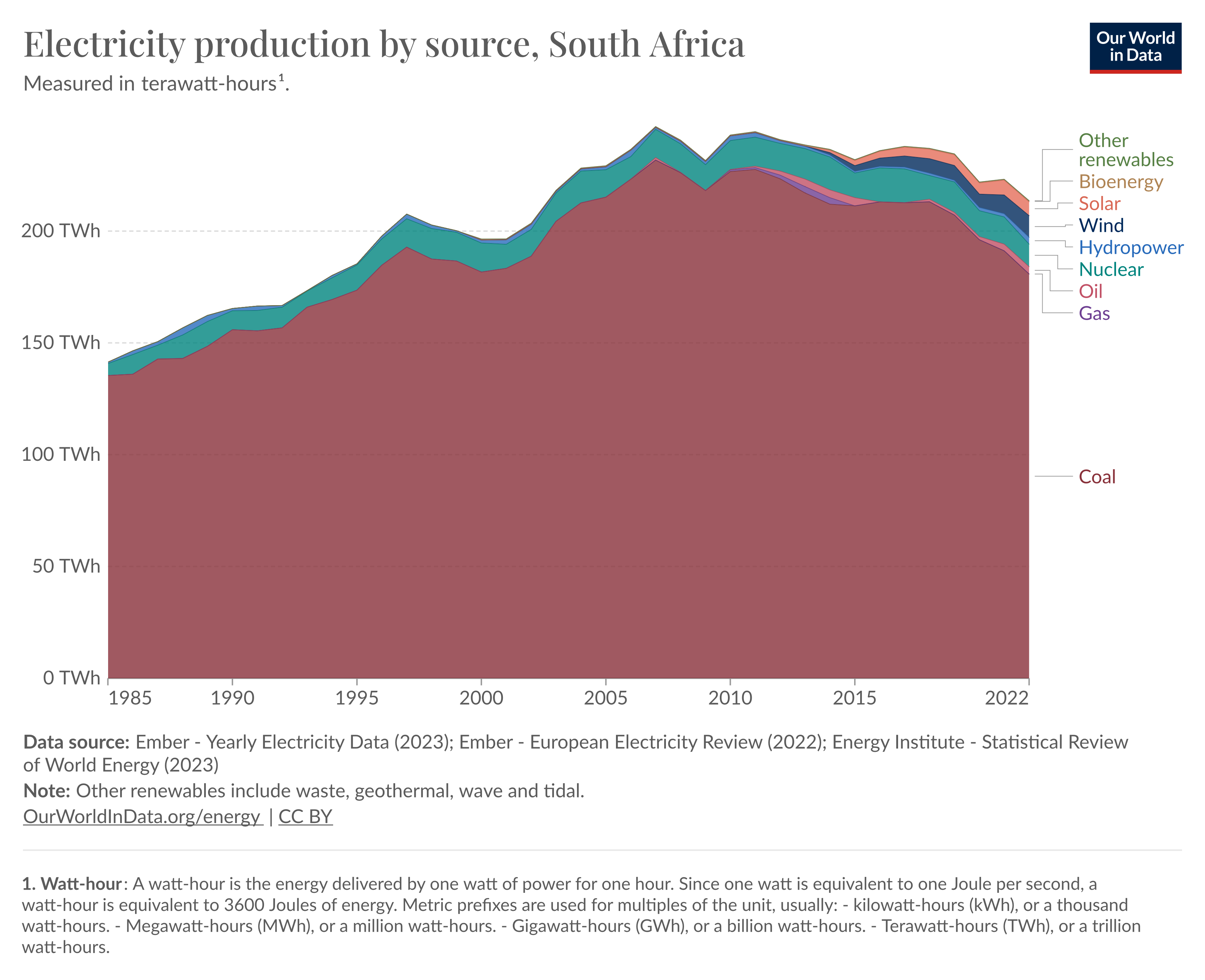
Electricity generation in South-Africa by source

Electricity in South Africa is mostly generated from coal. Most of the country's coal-fired power stations are in the same province as most of the coal mining, Mpumalanga. Many are expensive and unreliable, and this is part of the cause of South African blackouts.

=== Liquid fuel ===
Around 35% of liquid fuel used in South Africa is derived from coal mined by Sasol Mining at the Secunda CTL plants.

=== Household use ===
In 1995 around a million lower-income households in South Africa depended on coal as their primary energy source for cooking, lighting and heating. This number has been decreasing steadily during the first decade of the 21st century due to the expansion of electricity supply to lower-income households and rural regions.

== Illness and deaths ==
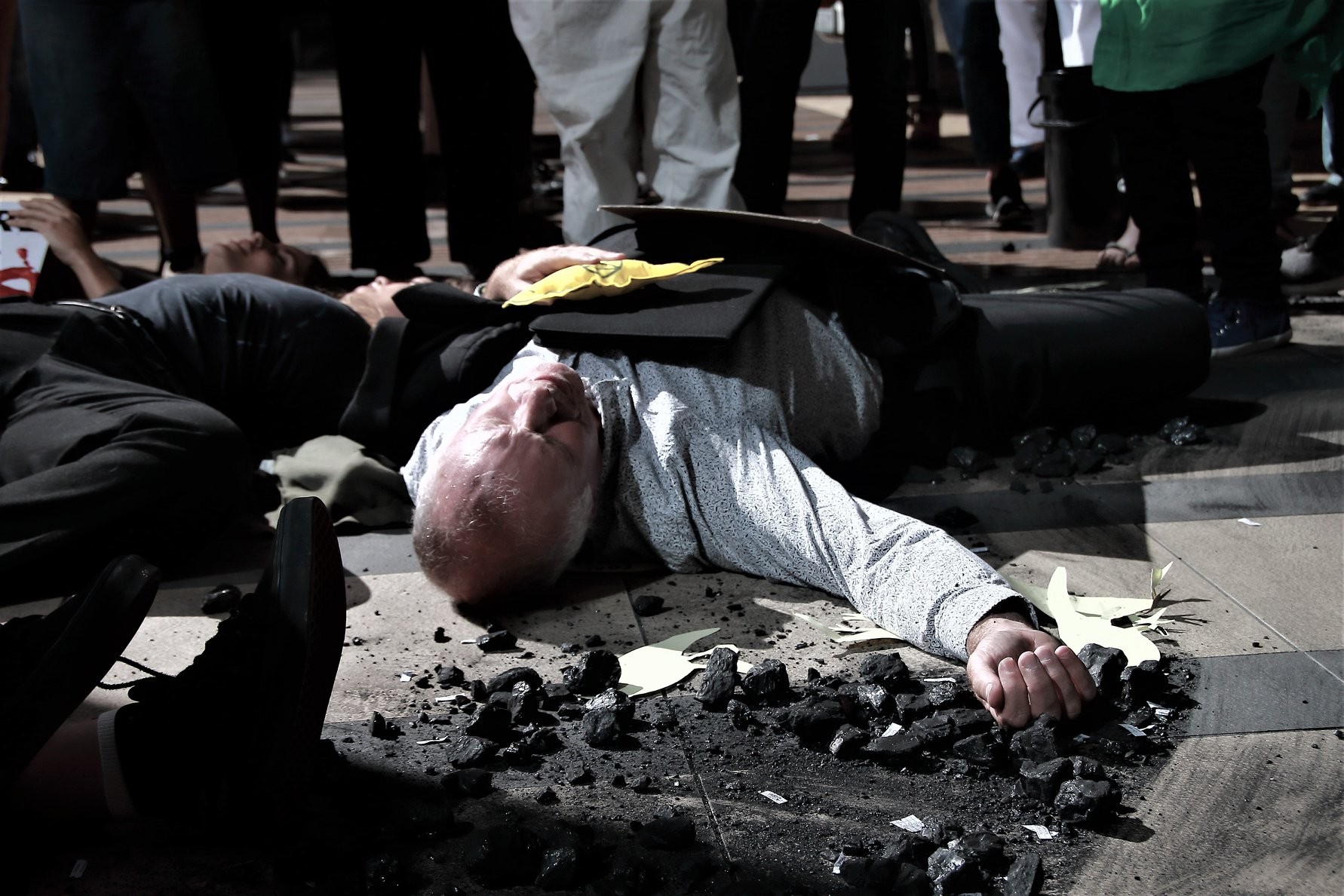
Environmentalist protestors at a die-in protest in South Africa in 2021. Widespread coal use for power creates air pollution that causes early deaths in South Africa.

The constitution says that people have a right to “an environment that is not harmful to their health and well-being.”

A 2017 study estimated over 2000 early deaths a year are caused by Eskom's coal-fired power. However Eskom said in 2023 that the number was 330. A 2023 study for all coal power but only PM2.5 estimated 800.

Mining coal and burning it at home can both cause health problems.

== Environmental impact ==
The government estimated 2020 total greenhouse gas emissions at 442 million tonnes CO2eq. Coal power is estimated to emit about 45% of total GHG.

Environmentalists in South Africa and abroad have criticized the decision of the World Bank's approval for a $3.75 billion loan to build the world's fourth-largest coal-fired power in South Africa. The plant will increase the demand for coal mining and production. Protesters are urging the bank to stop supporting the development of coal plants and other large emitters of greenhouse gas and polluting operations from coal mining.

Some coal mines have been abandoned by their owners, mainly due to companies ceasing to exist. Many of these mines, such as the Transvaal and Delagoa Bay Collieries (T&DB) outside Witbank, have not been rehabilitated prior to being abandoned and are a major source of water and air pollution. It is estimated that clean-up and rehabilitation of the T&DB Collieries will cost around R100 million. Coal seam fires were common, but controlled, at T&DB Collieries during the mine's operation, but the fires have been left to burn out of control since the mine was closed in 1953, to the extent that in 1995 flames could be seen above ground.

== See also ==
- Coal mining
- List of coalfields
