= Coal in Indonesia =

Coal supplies a large share of energy in Indonesia. The world's largest coal exporter, the country plays a significant role in the global coal market, primarily serving Asian countries such as China, India and Japan.

== History ==
Mining started in 1849.

== Mining and exports ==
As of 2019, Indonesia exported 506 million short tons of coal, making up 32% of the world's coal exports. The country's coal production surged to a record 679 million short tons in 2019, a 12% increase from the previous year. This spike in production led to a drop in prices, prompting the government to set a production cap of 606 million short tons in 2020.

Domestically, Indonesia implemented a Domestic Market Obligation (DMO), requiring mining companies to allocate 25% of their production for local use at a fixed price of $70 per ton. However, due to a reduction in domestic demand in 2020, the Indonesian Coal Mining Association requested a temporary suspension of the DMO.

Indonesia's coal production reached a record high in 2024, rising from 775 million tonnes in 2023 to 836 million tonnes in 2024. This also exceeded the government's target of 710 million tonnes.

Indonesia's coal reserves are substantial, estimated to last over 80 years, with significant deposits located in South Sumatra, East Kalimantan, and South Kalimantan. The country has been focusing on increasing exploration and production, which grew by approximately 105% from 2010 to 2020, driven by robust demand in Asia.

Indonesia is the world's largest coal exporter. Due to the energy transition and political split between Russia and the West over Ukraine, Russia is increasingly orienting its exports towards Asia, providing stiffer competition for Indonesia.

== Electricity generation ==
As of 2025 the country is building more coal-fired power plants.

== Death and disease ==
International Institute for Sustainable Development says over 7 thousand early deaths per year. But a more recent projection from the Centre for Research on Energy and Clean Air projects over 150 thousand early deaths between 2026 and 2050 due to air pollution in Indonesia from coal power plants. Mining can cause black lung disease. Dust may cause acute respiratory infection.

== Environmental impact ==
Coal mining causes deforestation in Kalimantan. According to Greenpeace, coal plants in Indonesia reduce fishing catches.

== Phase-out ==
In terms of environmental goals, Perusahaan Listrik Negara (PLN), the state electricity company, has plans to phase out coal-powered plants by 2056 to achieve carbon neutrality. Before ceasing new coal power plant constructions after 2023, PLN will complete an additional 42 GW of coal-fired capacity. Furthermore, PLN has started co-firing biomass with coal in 17 power plants to reduce carbon emissions.

The Indonesian coal industry is rather fragmented. Output is supplied by a few large producers and a large number of small firms. Top 10 Coal Companies in Indonesia in the industry include the following:

1. PT Bumi Resources Tbk (BUMI)
2. Sinar Mas Mining Group
3. PT Adaro Energy Tbk (ADRO)
4. PT Indika Energy Tbk (INDY)
5. PT Bayan Resources Tbk (BYAN)
6. PT Bukit Asam Tbk (PTBA)
7. PT BlackGold Group
8. PT Golden Energy Minerals Tbk (GEMS)
9. PT Kideco Jaya Agung
10. PT Multi Harapan Utama

== Coal bed methane ==
With 453 trillion ft^{3} (12.8 trillion m^{3}) of coal bed methane (CBM) reserve mainly in Kalimantan and Sumatra, Indonesia has potential to redraft its energy charts as United States with its shale gas. With low enthusiasm to develop CBM project, partly in relation to environmental concern regarding emissions of greenhouse gases and contamination of water in the extraction process, the government targeted 8.9 million ft^{3} (250 thousand m^{3}) per day at standard pressure for 2015.
