= Coal in New Zealand =

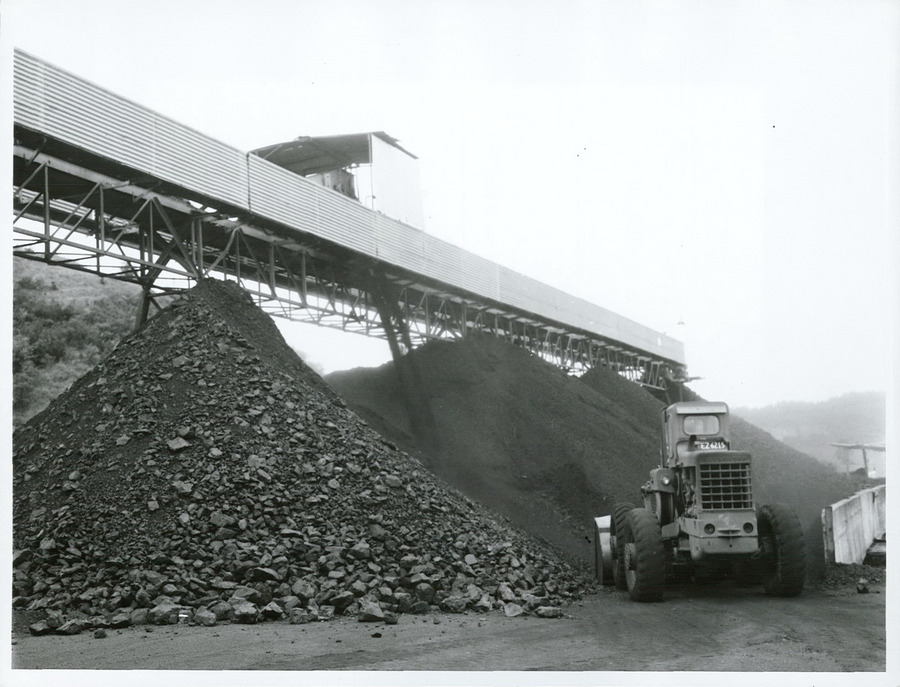
Part of the Maramarua Open Cast Coal Mine in 1966. The aerial cableway in the photo transported coal directly to the nearby Meremere Power Station.

New Zealand coal reserves are in excess of 15 billion tonnes, mainly in Waikato, Taranaki, West Coast, Otago and Southland. Over 80% of the reserves are in Southland lignite deposits. These were worth $100 billion in 2010.

Some Maori tribes had known of coal (waro) and its use as cooking fuel, but large-scale mining only commenced with arrival of European settlers.

== Geology ==
The types of coal found in New Zealand include lignites, sub-bituminous, bituminous and semi-anthracite coals. However, the geology of many coal fields can be complex, with significant structural tectonic disturbances caused by many fields being found near the boundaries between the Pacific and Indo-Australian tectonic plates that run through the country. Unlike most of the world's coals, which are typically 300 to 350 million years old, New Zealand coals were formed between 30 and 70 million years ago. This age difference means New Zealand coals have some valuable properties for specialist uses.

== Mining ==
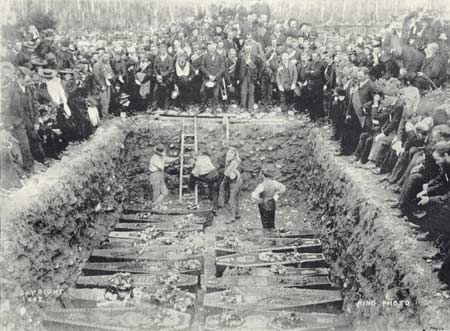
The burial of the victims of the 1896 Brunner Mine disaster

Coal mining by Europeans commenced in New Zealand during the 1840s. It was conducted using hand tools until the early 1900s, when explosives and tools powered by compressed air began to be used. Most coal mining since the early 2000s has used open-cut techniques.

Underground mining for coal is dangerous, and has led to many deaths and injuries in New Zealand. In March 1896, 65 coal miners were killed during the Brunner Mine disaster; as of 2021 this remained New Zealand's most deadly industrial accident. The Pike River Mine disaster in November 2010 caused the deaths of 29 coal miners.

== Climate change ==
Burning coal for electricity contributes to New Zealand's greenhouse gas emissions. The Climate Change Commission has recommended that the use of coal be "phased out as soon as possible". The New Zealand government has a goal of ending the use of coal and other non-renewables for power generation by 2030.

In 2020 New Zealand imported 1.084 million tonnes of coal, of which 90 per cent was sourced from Indonesia and the remainder from Australia. Almost all of the imports were sub-bituminous coal, which produces large quantities of carbon emissions when burnt. Two-thirds of the imported coal was used by the Huntly Power Station, with the remainder being used by New Zealand Steel and Golden Bay Cement.

In May 2023 the New Zealand Government announced that New Zealand Steel would be provided with $NZ140 million in subsidies to transition away from burning coal as part its production processes; it is estimated that this will reduce New Zealand's total greenhouse gas emissions by one per cent. In June that year the government implemented a policy which includes banning the installation of new low and medium temperature coal boilers from July 2023 and phasing out existing such boilers by 2037.

== See also ==
- Coal mining
- Mining in New Zealand
