= Coal in China =

Coal supplies most of China's energy

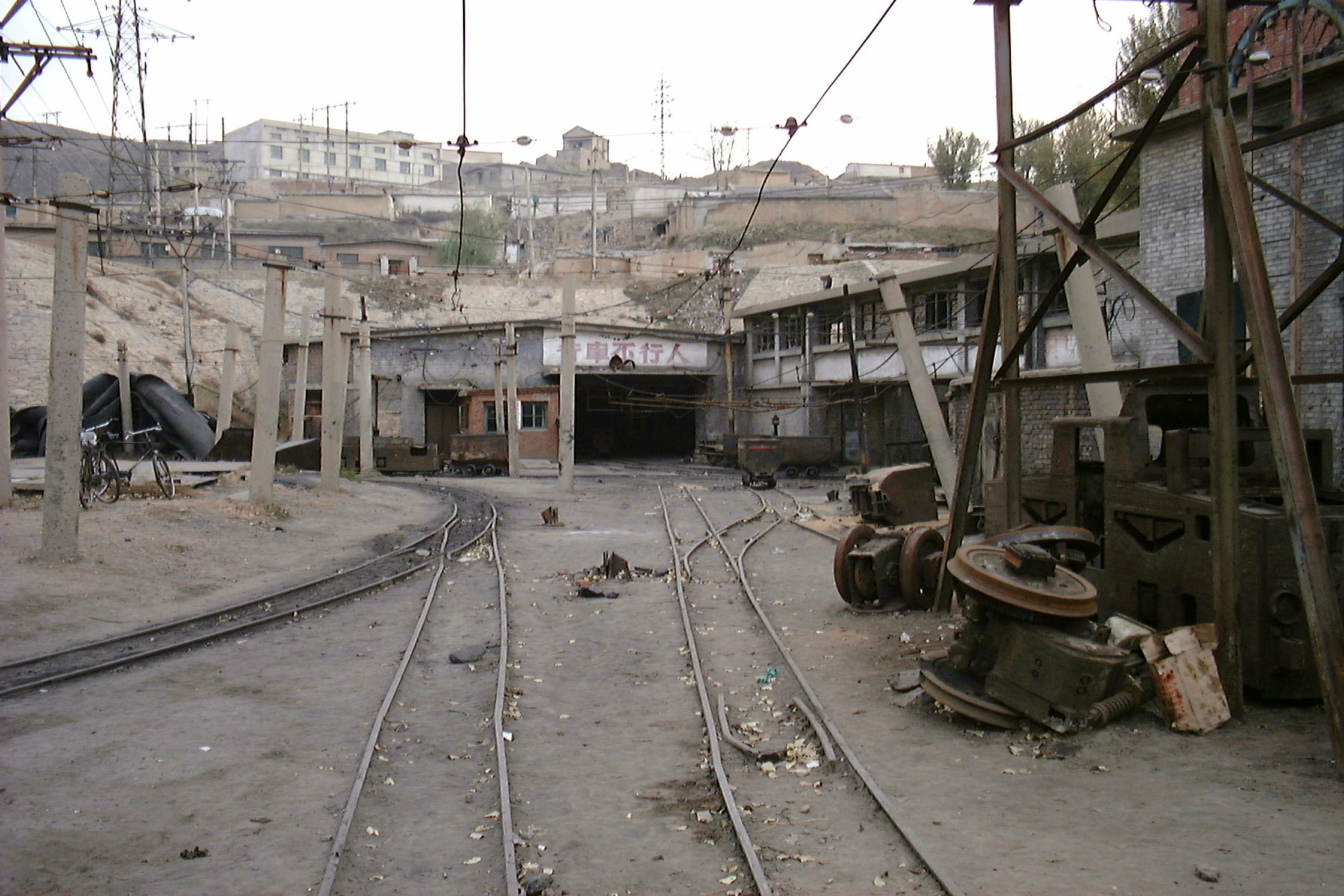
Entrance to a small coal mine in China, 1999

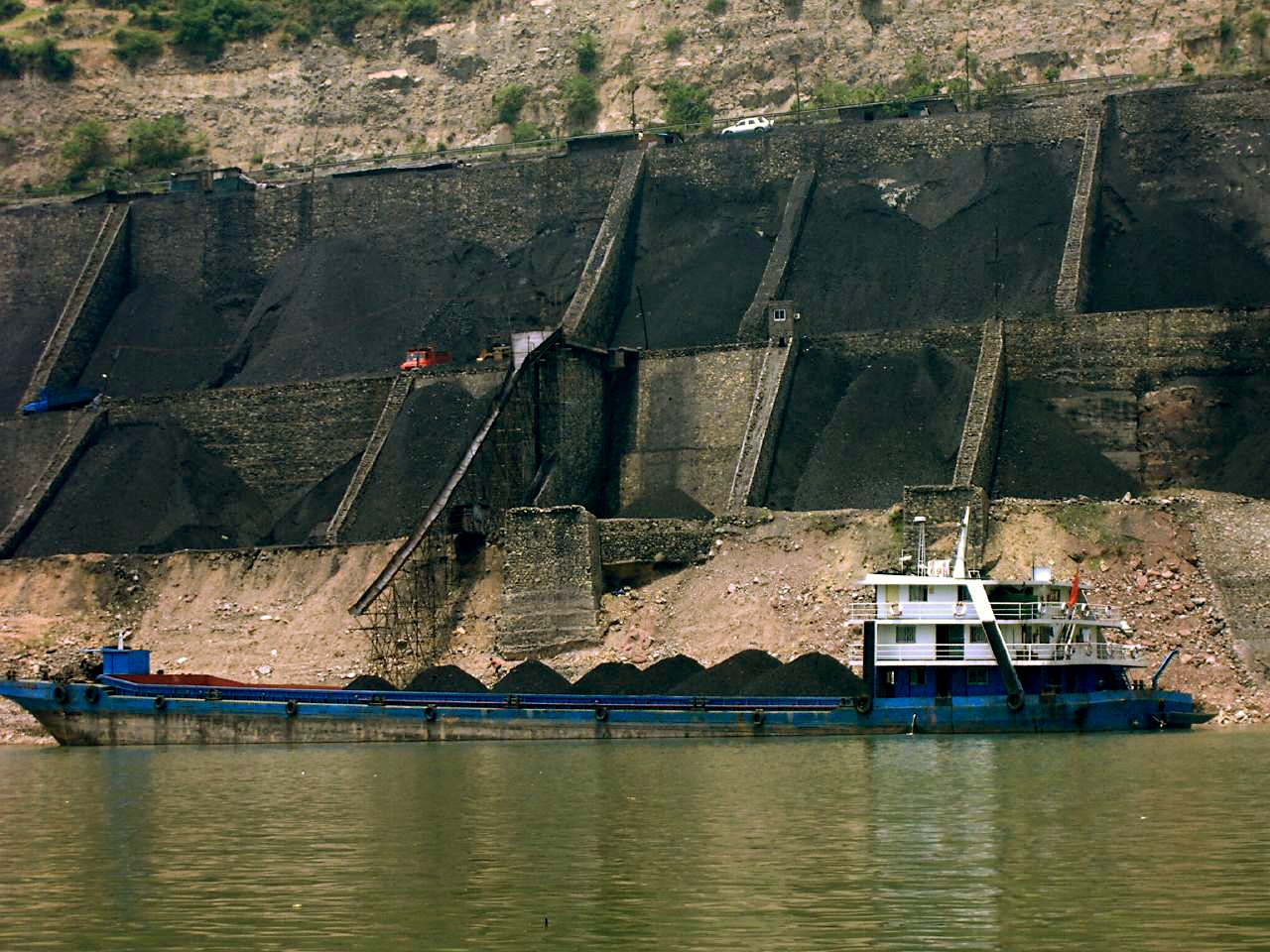
A coal shipment underway in China, 2007

Historical coal production of different countries

The People's Republic of China is the largest producer and consumer of coal and coal power in the world. China produces approximately 4.8 billion tons of coal per year, over half of the global total.

Rapid development and heavy coal usage has led to air quality in China declining significantly in the 2000s and causing adverse effects on public health. This led to government policy efforts to reduce reliance on fossil fuels. As a result, the role of coal has been evolving in China; new coal capacity is being continued to be built primarily to ensure energy security and provide grid reliability to manage peak demand and variability in renewable generation. This has led to coal plants being increasingly used at lower utilization rates, shifting from baseload generation to a more supportive backup role.

By 2025, coal accounted for approximately 54.6% of China's electricity generation, and fell by 1.9%, the first decline since 2015. According to Wood Mackenzie, coal-fired power capacity factors in China have been declining in recent decades, and was as high as 60% in 2011, declining to 52% in 2024 and 48.2% in 2025. Analysis projected that utilisation could further decline to around 32% by 2035. The long-term goal of China's energy transition policies is to significantly reduce coal burning to reach net-zero carbon emissions by 2060.

== History ==
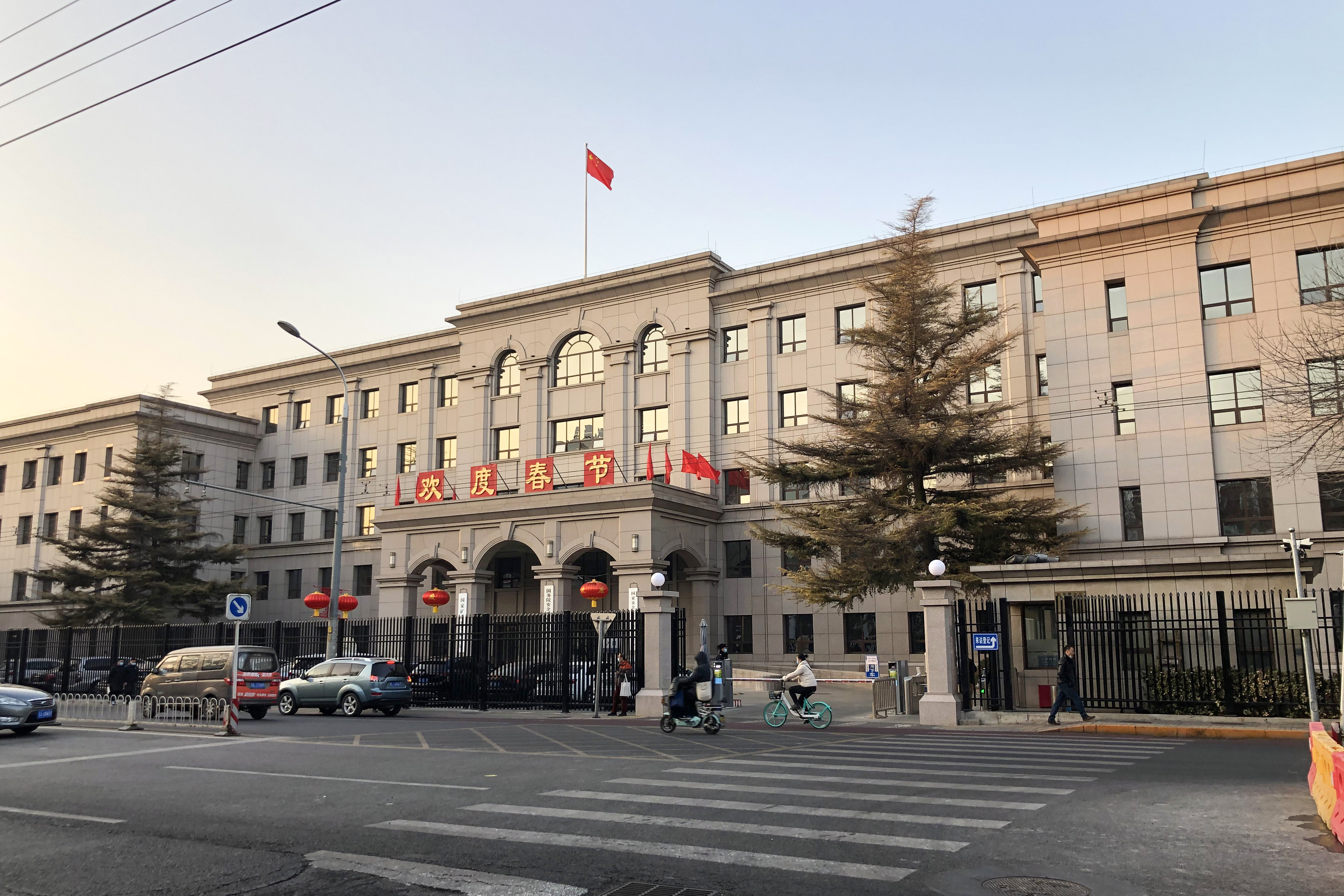
Site of the former Ministry of Coal Industry in Hepingli, Beijing; the ministry was abolished in 1998

=== Coal mines in pre-industrial China ===
Ancient people in current China started using coal around 6,000 years ago. Historians suspect that the Chinese were involved in the surface mining of coal around 3490 BC, pioneering the pre-modern world. Fushan mine is pointed out as the earliest coal mine in the ancient world and started around 1000 BC. In pre-modern China, coal was constrained both by the limitations of traditional technology and the weakness of demand.

In the 3rd century BC, Chinese people began burning coal for heat. The spread of coal use was gradual until the late 11th century when a timber shortage in north China produced a fast-paced expansion in coal mining and consumption. In 1000 AD, Chinese mines were ahead of most mining advancements in the world.

Coal mines in China faced similar problems to European ones. Both Chinese and European miners preferred to use drift mines sunk horizontally into the hillside for drainage of water. In the 18th century, British observers realized that such mines in Guangdong were opening out directly on to a river. Slope mines were the second most common type, as mines in Leiyang, Hunan.

In the 19th century, shaft mines were predominant, especially in north China. European observers interpreted that as a consequence of the lack of wood in the zone to hold up the roof in slope mines. Flooding was a constant problem, and several mines were abandoned for that reason.

Coal mines in China were as deep as those in Europe. In areas such as Shanxi with natural drainage, mines were as deep as 120 m. From Henan and Manchuria, mines had depths of 90 m or more.

=== Early coal consumption in China ===
Coal consumption in traditional China was substantial but low on a per capita basis. Main coal demand came from industry. The earliest references to coal are in the context of smelting methods. The technology was spread from the central plain to outlying areas in China.

In the 11th century, the iron produced in north China was smelted in coke-burning blast-furnaces. Deforestation in that zone forced to turn to the use of coke, mushrooming ironworking centers along the Henan-Hebei border. Accounts of that period estimate that at least 140,000 tons of coal a year were used by the iron industry in that zone. Chinese scientist Song Yingxing suggested that around 70% of iron was smelted with coal. Meanwhile, 30% used charcoal. Shanxi was the center of the iron industry in late traditional times. German scientist Ferdinand von Richthofen accounted for the use of coal in several areas of the province.

Early descriptions of coal for household purposes go back until the 6th century when a writer pointed out that food tastes different according to whether it was cooked over coal, charcoal, bamboo, or grass. From the 11th century, coal was the main option in the household in the capital at Kaifeng. At the beginning of the 12th century, twenty new coal markets were established and coal replaced charcoal in the zone. Increasing demand led to the development of mining in areas of Henan and Shandong. Marco Polo claimed that coal was "burnt through the province of Cathay" and pointed out that it was used in bathhouses.

=== Modern history ===
In 1955, the People's Republic of China established the Ministry of Coal Industry, which directed and coordinated the expansion of the coal industry. It was established when the former Ministry of Fuel Industry separated into distinct ministries corresponding to energy source (coal, petroleum, electricity).

During the First Five-Year Plan period (1953-1957), coal output in the PRC nearly doubled, exceeding the plan's goal for coal output by 10%. Despite this growth in output, coal production had not kept pace with the needs of China's also fast-growing heavy industries. As a result, the State Council concluded in 1957 that it was critical to "concurrently increase coal production and conserve coal use" because coal production was "still unable to meety the needs of national economic construction and the people's livelihood."

In 1958, the small coal pit campaign began. Acting on the view that small, local coal pits could be built easily and were therefore the quickest way of increasing production, the Ministry of Coal Industry supported local Chinese Communist Party cadre in encouraging the campaign. Less than two months after the campaign's beginning, more than 100,000 coal pits has been excavated in China, especially in the south. Although coal production increased by large amounts, quality declined and resulted in increased thermal inefficiency. China's lack of coal relative to its needs and the poor quality of the coal remained a problem until 1980.

During the Great Leap Forward, the Ministry of Coal Industry experimented with hydraulic mining.

== Production and trade ==
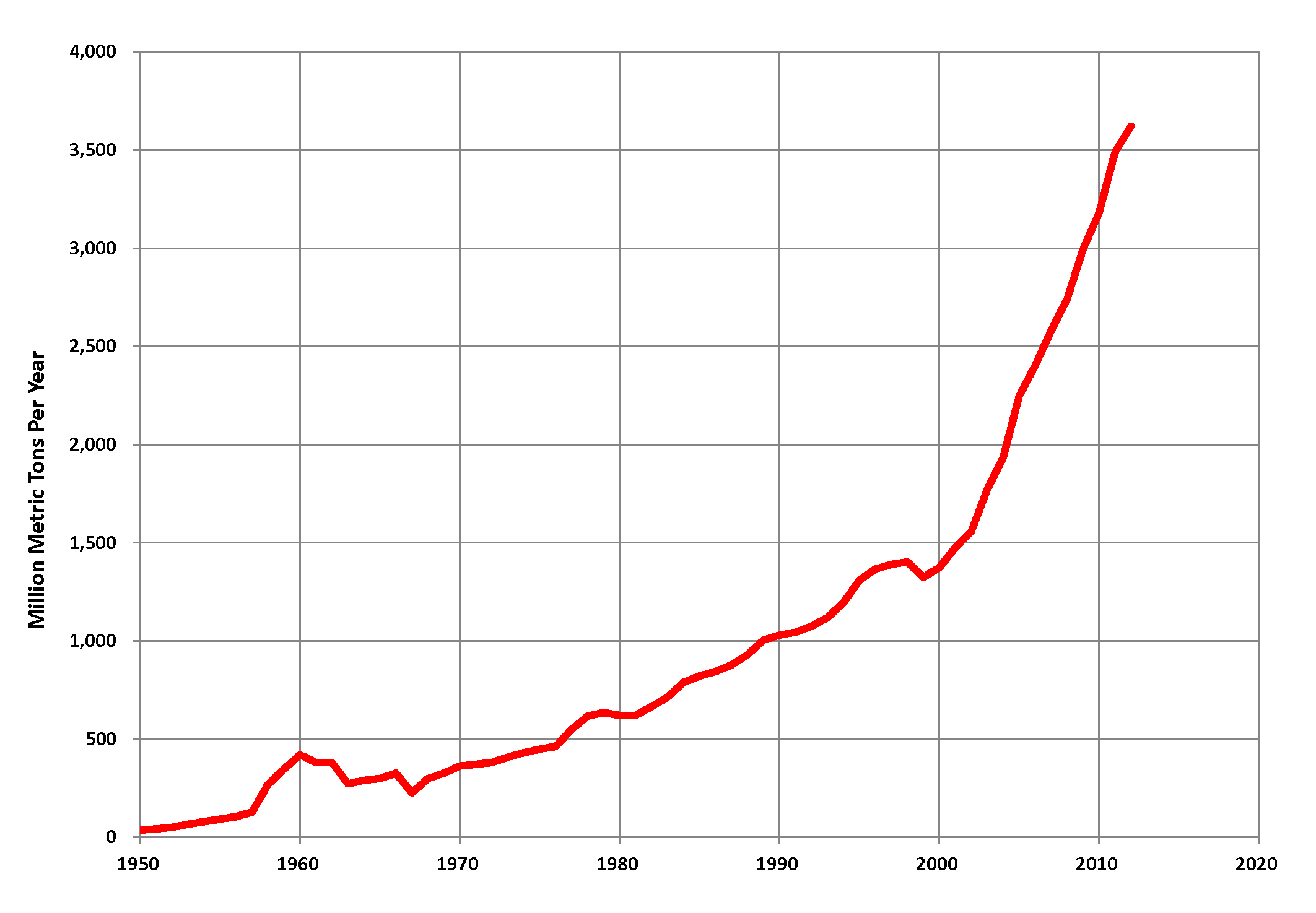
Coal production in China, 1950–2012

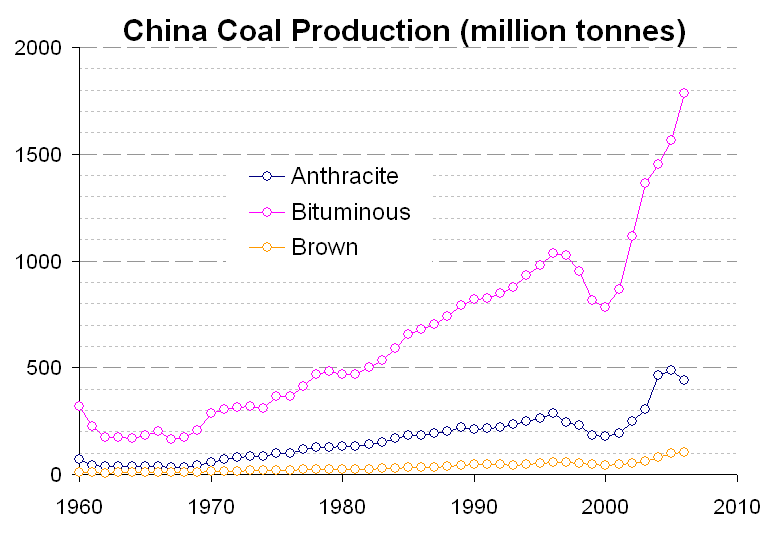
Production of coal within China by type

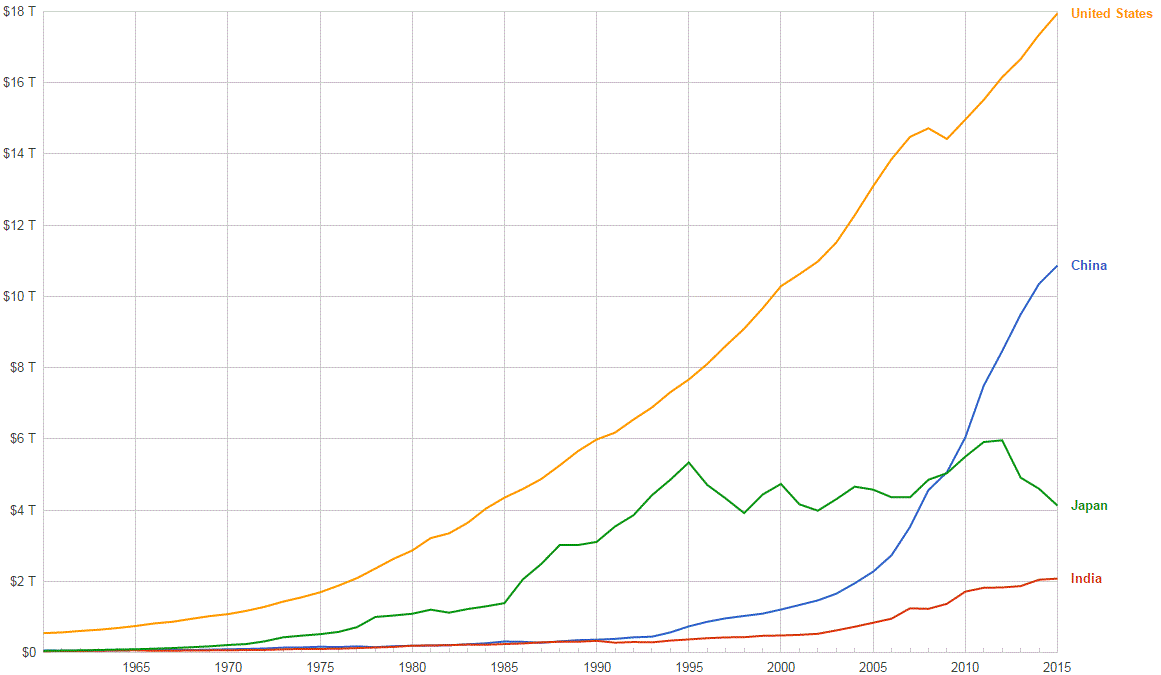
For reference: GDP of the PRC. Coal production and usage demonstrates a hypersensitivity to economic changes.

Coal is the most abundant mineral resource in China. China is the world's largest coal producer, producing 4.71 billion tonnes in 2023 and accounting for over half of global production. China operates approximately 4,700 coal mines as of 2021, down from more than 10,000 in 2015, with average production capacity above 1.1 million tonnes per annum. China has approximately 1,900 coal mines producing one million tonnes a year or more.

Coal reserves are concentrated in Inner Mongolia, Shanxi, and Shaanxi, creating logistical challenges, as transport to southeastern coastal regions consumes nearly half of China's rail capacity. As of 2021, coal production has been further concentrated in Xinjiang, Shaanxi, Inner Mongolia, and Shanxi; these four provinces together account for 80% of the country's coal production. China is developing approximately 1,280 million tonnes per annum of new coal mine capacity, with nearly 80% being greenfield developments.

China is also the world's largest coal importer, with Russia and Indonesia as major suppliers in the 2020s. Coal imports reached a record high of 474.42 million tons in 2023, with expectations of at least 500 million metric tons in 2024, representing a 5% increase. National coal import volume reached 490 million tons from January to November 2024, a year-on-year increase of 14.8%, setting a historical record. While most thermal coal is produced domestically, coking coal for steel production is imported. Imports from Mongolia and the U.S. increased during the 2020–2022 boycott of Australian coal, before partial resumption of Australian imports in 2023.

== Consumption ==
Coal provided 59% of electricity generation in 2024. Major consumers include electricity generation, steel production, and rural households. Coal consumption produces significant environmental and health impacts. In 2019, coal generated 7.24 billion tonnes of CO₂, about 14% of global emissions. Air pollution from coal causes an estimated 750,000 premature deaths annually, while indoor coal use in rural areas causes severe health problems for millions.

== Energy transition ==
Most CO₂ is from coal

Despite a rapid increase in renewable energy capacity, China continued to approve and build new coal-fired power plants in the past decades. Analysts attribute this expansion to a combination of system-level dynamics, institutional incentives, and regional policy priorities. While the country already possesses significant underutilised coal-fired capacity, new plants are often approved to ensure regional grid stability, provide backup during peak demand periods, and support local economic and employment objectives. New coal capacity is also built to replace old inefficient coal plants, in an effort to improve efficiency and meet stricter emissions standards.

Power shortages in 2020 and 2022 exposed limitations in grid flexibility and coordination between provinces, sometimes resulting in electricity being exported from areas experiencing local deficits. This encouraged provincial authorities to sanction new coal projects as a precaution, even though existing dispatchable resources (including coal, gas, hydro, and nuclear plants) were sufficient to meet peak demand. Economic incentives also play a role. Coal power plants are relatively inexpensive to construct, can be rapidly approved, and offer revenue and employment benefits. Long-term contracts and guaranteed operating hours further incentivize local governments and coal companies to favor these plants, despite low utilization rates.

In 2024, coal-fired power plants in China operated at an average utilization rate of around 50%, indicating that most new plants are intended primarily as backup rather than continuous baseload units. Importantly, the addition of new coal capacity does not necessarily lead to higher coal consumption or increased greenhouse gas emissions. Coal-fired generation increasingly serves as a residual source, filling gaps left by rapidly growing renewable energy output. Consequently, overall coal generation has remained relatively stable or declined in some months, even as new capacity comes online.

According to DNV's 2024 China Energy Transition Outlook, renewable energy is expected to supply 88% of electricity generation by 2050, with wind and solar each contributing around 38%, alongside smaller shares from hydropower and nuclear energy.

In 2025, China's coal-fired power generation dropped by 1.9%, the first decrease since 2015, despite its energy demands has increased by 5% during that same year. According to Wood Mackenzie, the drop was attributed to a rapid increase in new non-fossil generation that has "finally outpaced demand growth", while coal plants had been operating at lower utilisation rates and being used more for grid flexibility and peak demand rather than baseload generation.

== Research ==
=== Fuel cells ===
There have been research in China to develop coal-based fuel cell technologies that can generate electricity through electrochemical processes rather than needing to burn the coal. Conventional coal-fired power generation relies on combustion to produce heat, however its efficiency is constrained by the thermodynamic limits known as the Carnot cycle. In a 2026 paper published in the peer-reviewed journal Energy Reviews, researchers at the Chinese Academy of Sciences had argued that direct coal fuel cell systems could, in principle, achieve higher theoretical efficiencies by avoiding the combustion-based energy conversion losses.

The research team reportedly developed a prototype, called a zero-carbon-emission direct coal fuel cell (ZC-DCFC), that generate energy at an efficiency of up to 40 per cent and avoids efficiency losses associated with combustion and thermal engines. It relies on electrochemical oxidation of coal to generate electricity while having zero direct carbon emissions, under experimental conditions.

== Safety ==
China's coal mining industry remains dangerous, though significant progress has been made in reducing fatalities. Deaths fell from 5,798 in 2000 to 1,049 in 2013, and further decreased to 1,132 deaths from 442 mining accidents between 2016 and 2020.

From 2017 to 2022, mainland China experienced 98 major coal accidents (involving three or more fatalities) resulting in 699 deaths, with the total number of accidents gradually decreasing from 2019 onwards. The most common accident types during this period were roof falls (24.3% of accidents), gas explosions (16.2%), and coal and gas outbursts (13.5%). Two regions were identified as particularly accident-prone: North China (centered in Shanxi) and Southwest China (centered in Guizhou).

Safety measures implemented include closing small mines with backward production capacities (428 small coal mines with annual output less than 300,000 tons were closed by 2020), improving ventilation systems, strengthening gas and water disaster control, upgrading safety infrastructure, and cracking down on illegal operations. The closure of small mines was particularly effective, as 2020 marked the first year since the founding of the PRC in 1949 without a major gas-related accident. Despite these improvements, underground mining continues to account for nearly all coal-related accidents, with human factors such as illegal blasting operations remaining significant safety concerns.

== See also ==
- Mining industry of China
- Category:Coal companies of China
- Clean coal technology
- Debate over China's economic responsibilities for climate change mitigation
