= AlamTri Resources =

Indonesian company

PT Alamtri Resources Indonesia Tbk
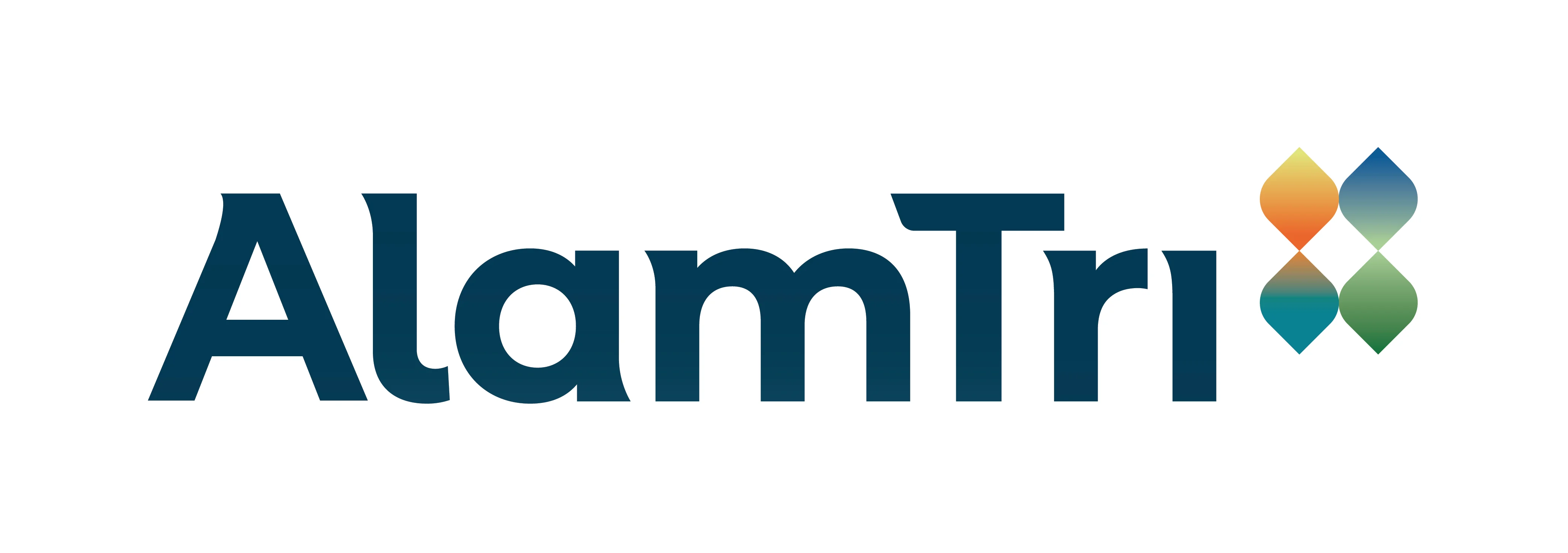
- Formerly: Adaro Energy
- Type: Public
- Traded as: IDX: ADRO
- ISIN: ID1000111305
- Industry: Coal, Power Plant, Water, Logistics
- Founded: 1982
- Headquarters: Tabalong, South Kalimantan, Indonesia
- Key people: Garibaldi Thohir, CEO; Edwin Soeryadjaya, President Commissioner
- Revenue: ▼USD 3.457 billion (2019)
- Operating income: ▼USD 618 million (2019)
- Net income: ▼USD 435 million (2019)
- Total assets: ▼USD 7.217 billion (2019)
- Total equity: ▼USD 3.983 billion (2019)
- Number of employees: 23,000 (2019)
- Subsidiaries: List: Adaro Indonesia Adaro Power Saptaindra Sejati Rehabilitasi Lingkungan Indonesia Adaro Logistics Maritim Barito Perkasa Makmur Sejahtera Wisesa Arindo Holdings Adaro Persada Mandiri IndoMet Coal Alam Tri Abadi Adaro Mining Technologies Padang Sejahtera Agri Multi Lestari Tanjung Power Indonesia Sarana Rekreasi Mandiri Rachindo Investments Dianlia Setyamukti Balangan Anugerah Semesta Puradika Bongkar Muat Makmur Harapan Bahtera Internusa
- Website: www.alamtri.com

PT AlamTri Resources Tbk (formerly known as Adaro Energy) is an Indonesian coal mining company, the country's second-largest by production volume. In the 2023 Forbes Global 2000, Alamtri was ranked as the 1393rd-largest public company in the world. The company is an Indonesian energy group that focuses on coal mining through subsidiaries. The principal mining location is at Tabalong district in South Kalimantan, where Alamtri operates the largest single-site coal mine in the southern hemisphere (roughly 110,000 tons of coal per day, or 40 million tons a year). AlamTri operates under a first-generation CCA (coal co-operation agreement) with the Indonesian Government valid until 2022.

In 2016, Alamtri (then doing business as Adaro) was clearing land in Central Java for a 2,000MW coal plant, after a delay for more than four years due to land acquisition issues. The construction of Indonesia's largest coal plant, into which Adaro invested $4.2 billion, began in June 2016. Adaro's strategy focuses on power generation as one of its "three pillars", besides coal exports and logistics.

In 2023, the company invested in North Kalimantan, acquiring 15,000 Hectares of land to setup Kalimantan Industrial Park Indonesia (KIPI), which is the only fully green and sustainable industrial park in Indonesia. To power this industrial park, the company also invested in a 1,375 MW hydropowerplant, the Mentarang Induk Hydroelectric Power Plant, which is targeted to be operational by 2030.

== History ==
In 1976 the Indonesian Mines Department divided East and South Kalimantan into eight coal blocks and invited tenders for these blocks. Spanish state-owned enterprise Enadimsa (empresa nacional adaro investigaciones mineras s.a.) bid for Block 8 in the Tanjung district of South Kalimantan. Initially no bidders are willing to invest in the said block due to numerous problems such as its proximity and low coal qualities. Enadimsa later formed PT Adaro Indonesia to manage the coal mining in the block. The name was chosen to pay tribute to the Adaro family for its contribution to mining industry in its home country Spain. Adaro Indonesia's Coal Cooperation Agreement (CCA) was signed on Nov. 2, 1982. In 1989 a consortium of Australian and Indonesian companies purchased 80% of Adaro Indonesia from Enadimsa.

In May 1990, Adaro Indonesia began approaching a number of banks to obtain financing of US$28 million. However, all the banks approached refused to provide financing, because the type of sub-bituminous coal mined by Adaro Indonesia had not yet been traded internationally in significant volumes, while the domestic market at that time was still relatively small. The bank also doubts the feasibility of constructing a coal transportation road, because 27 km of the road crosses swamps, making it quite expensive. In the end, Adaro Indonesia shareholders only borrowed US$ 20 million.

Adaro went into legal trouble in 1997 when its subsidiary, Asminco Bara Utama applied for a loan to Deutsche Bank branch in Singapore. Asminco provided several concessions, including a 40% stake in Adaro Indonesia. Additionally, Asminco pledged shares in PT Indonesia Bulk Terminal for the loan. But Asminco other parent company, Beckett Pte Ltd unable to pay its loan to Deutsche Bank which caused Deutsche Bank to demand enforcement of concession via court in Jakarta. Deutsche Bank released a 40% guarantee of Adaro Indonesia shares to PT Dianlia Setyamukti, a company owned by Edwin Soeryadjaya, for US$46 million. However Beckett objected the verdict and sued Deutsche Bank in both Jakarta and Singapore courts. Amidst the controversy surrounding the Dianlia transaction, other Indonesian businessmen, namely Benny Subianto and Garibaldi Thohir, acquired 40.8% of New Hope's Adaro Indonesia shares through PT Alam Tri Abadi.

The company was formally unveiled in 2004 and acquired Adaro Indonesia via leveraged buyout with total amount of US$923 million with US$50 million equity. In 2008, Adaro Energy raised $1.3 billion in the country's largest ever initial public offering. In 2010, Adaro expanded outside South Kalimantan by acquiring IndoMet Coal, a joint venture company with BHP Billiton located in Central and East Kalimantan. In 2024, the company officially changed its name to AlamTri Resources.
