= Adventure (disambiguation) =

An adventure is an exciting experience that is typically bold, sometimes risky, undertaking.

Adventure or The Adventure may also refer to:

== Arts, entertainment, and media ==
=== Gaming ===
==== Video games ====
- Colossal Cave Adventure, also known as Adventure, a 1976 text adventure computer game for the PDP-10
- Adventure (1980 video game), a video game for the Atari 2600
- Adventure (1982 video game), an 8-bit computer game published in the UK by Micro Power

==== Other uses in gaming ====
- Adventure, another term for an expansion pack
- Adventure!, a 2001 pulp fiction role-playing game by White Wolf
- Adventure (Dungeons & Dragons), a module or scenario for Dungeons & Dragons
- Adventure International, an American video game publisher
- The Adventure Company, a Canadian video game publisher

=== Genres ===
- Adventure (role-playing games), a scripted plot line in role-playing games
- Adventure game, a computer game genre
- Adventure fiction, a narrative genre
- Adventure film, a film genre

=== Films ===
- Adventure (1925 film), an American silent film by Victor Fleming
- Adventure (1936 film), a Swedish film directed by Per-Axel Branner
- Adventure (1946 film), an American film starring Clark Gable and Greer Garson
- L'Avventura (The Adventure), a 1960 Italian film directed by Michelangelo Antonioni
- The Adventure (1974 film) (Al-Mughamara), a Syrian film
- Adventure (2011 film), a Hungarian film

=== Literature ===
- Adventure (novel), 1911 novel by Jack London
- The Adventures, a series of novels in the Forgotten Realms of Dungeons & Dragons

=== Music ===
==== Groups ====
- Adventures (band), an American rock band
- The Adventures, a Northern Irish rock band

==== Albums ====
- Adventure (Furslide album)
- Adventure (Madeon album)
- Adventure (Shonen Knife album)
- Adventure (Television album)
- Adventures (album), a 1984 album by T-Square

==== Songs ====
- "Adventure", by Momoko Kikuchi, 1986
- "Adventure" (Eleanor song), 1988
- "The Adventure", by Angels & Airwaves, 2006
- "Adventure", by Be Your Own Pet from Be Your Own Pet, 2006
- "Adventure", by Cheat Codes, 2015
- "Adventures", by Kid Cudi from Speedin' Bullet 2 Heaven, 2015
- "Adventure", by Matthew Parker from Adventure, 2016
- "Adventure" (Yoasobi song), 2023

=== Television ===
- Adventure (TV series), a 1953 documentary series on CBS

=== Other uses in arts, entertainment, and media ===
- Adventure (magazine), a pulp (and later true-story) magazine from 1910 to 1971
- Adventure Comics, a comic book series published by DC Comics from 1935 to 1983

== Geography ==
- Adventure, Guyana, a village
- Adventure Creek, a river in Alaska

== Transportation ==
- Adventure F series, a French line of paramotors
- Adventure SA, a French manufacturer of paramotors
- Trike Icaros Adventure S, a Brazilian ultralight trike design
- Adventure (ship), numerous vessels
- Mitsubishi Adventure or Freeca, a compact MPV sold in the Philippines

== Other uses ==
- an adventure: a venture or financial speculation
- HMS Adventure, several ships of the Royal Navy

== See also ==
- Adventures Unlimited (disambiguation)
- Adventure Aquarium
