= Adventure (ship) =

Numerous vessels have been named Adventure:

- Adventure Galley, an English ship captained by William Kidd, the notorious privateer turned pirate
- Adventure (1792 ship) was built by the crew of Captain Robert Gray on his second voyage in the maritime fur trade to the Northwest Coast of North America. The 45-ton sloop was built to allow the trading venture to access smaller inlets the Columbia could not reach. At the end of his second voyage Gray sold the ship to the Spanish Navy. It was renamed Orcacitas (also spelled Orcasitas or Horcasitas) and served the Naval Department of San Blas for some years.
- Adventure (1799 ship) was a French vessel that the British captured in 1799. New owners immediately sailed her as a slaver. She then made a voyage as West Indiaman during which a French privateer captured her, but the British Royal Navy quickly recaptured her. She then made a second slave trading voyage. Thereafter she became a general trader, trading primarily with the Baltic. She was wrecked in October 1814. Although she was refloated and taken into Copenhagen, she disappeared from subsequent ship arrival and departure data.
- Adventure (1802 ship) was a schooner launched at Liverpool. She made three voyages as a slave ship before a French privateer captured her in 1806 on her fourth voyage.
- Adventure (1804 ship) was a French privateer captured in 1803. She became a whaler that made two voyages to the Southern Whale Fishery. She was wrecked in April 1808 as she set out on her third.
- Adventure (1834 ship) was a wooden sloop that was built in 1834 at Brisbane Water. It was wrecked during a storm in July 1836, but the exact position where it was lost on the New South Wales coast is uncertain.
- Adventure (1850 schooner) was a wooden schooner built in 1850 at Hong Kong, that was wrecked in 1855 at Richmond River, New South Wales, under the master James Cook.
- Adventure (1926 schooner) is a gaff rigged knockabout schooner built in Essex, Massachusetts, and launched in 1926 to work the Grand Banks fishing grounds near Gloucester. She is one of only two surviving Grand Banks knockabouts – schooners designed without bowsprits for the safety of her crew. Adventure was declared a National Historic Landmark in 1994, underwent a substantial restoration in 2012, and sails today in the tourist trade out of Gloucester.

== See also ==
- HMS Adventure
