= Fort Defiance (British Columbia) =

Coordinates: 49.20521°N 125.84873°W

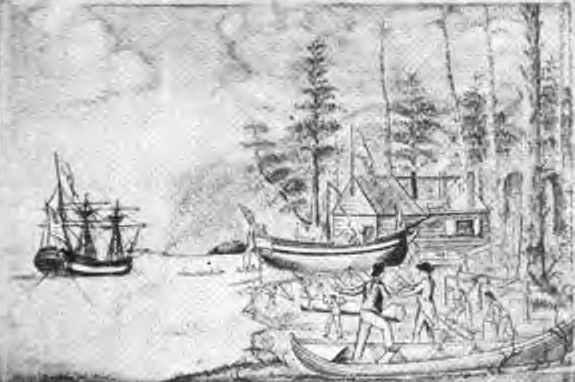
- Fort Defiance with Columbia in background and Adventure in foreground.
- Constructed: 1791-1792
- Location: Meares Island, British Columbia, Canada
- Continent: North America
- Abandoned: 1792

Fort Defiance was a small outpost that the crew of the Columbia Rediviva built as winter quarters during 1791–1792 on Meares Island in present-day British Columbia, Canada. American merchant and maritime fur trader Captain Robert Gray was in command.

== Prelude ==
In early August 1791, John Kendrick arrived in Clayoquot Sound and acquired land from Wickaninnish, chief of the Tla-o-qui-aht, in exchange for firearms. An Opitsaht village was nearby. Kendrick fortified a small island, and like his Nootka Sound base, called it Fort Washington. In late August, Robert Gray, of the same trading company, arrived on the Columbia Redivia. Following a short overlap, Kendrick sailed away on the Lady Washington for China.

== Fort Defiance ==
On September 19, Gray located a narrow cove suitable for wintering the Columbia, and building a sloop. Two days later, construction of their winter quarters began. Completed by September 30, the main building measured 11.0 metres (36 ft) long by 5.5 metres (18 ft) wide and was two storeys tall. Using 5,470 bricks from Boston, they built a large brick fireplace and a forge. The main building had two cannons mounted and musket loop holes for defending against possible attack. Other structures included a blacksmith shop, two sawpits for cutting logs, cabins, and a boatbuilding shed. On completion, four cannons, 40 muskets, and various other weapons on the Columbia were transferred ashore. Robert Haswell assumed charge of the base and ten men.

== Shipbuilding ==
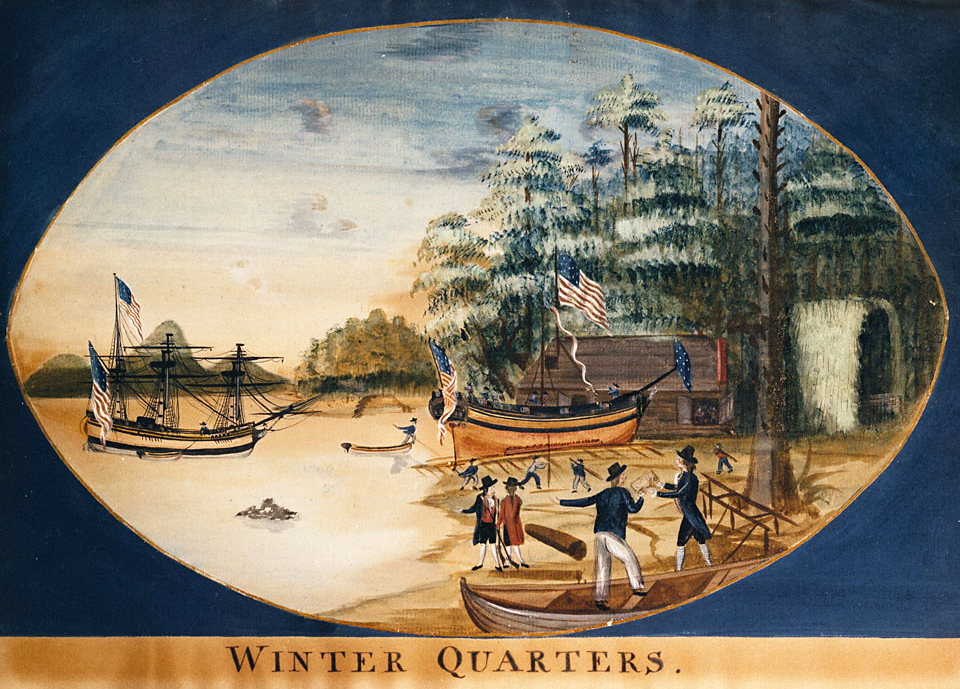
Launch of Adventure with Fort Defiance and Columbia in background. Painting by George Davidson, who served as an artist on Columbia

The next task was constructing the sloop Adventure, incorporating framing supplies carried in the Columbia's hold. On October 3, the keel was laid. While the 45-ton sloop was built on the beach, the whaleboat was built within the fort. The crew felled tall trees, floated them to the site, and shaped them into a mast and planks. On March 23, 1792, the ship was launched, making it the first American-built vessel in the Pacific Northwest. Before setting sail with both ships in March, the Americans abandoned the fort, stripping it of anything useful.

== First Nations interaction ==
For most of the winter relations with Wickaninnish and his people were good. On Christmas Day, Wickaninnish and a number of other chiefs dined aboard the Columbia, and on New Year's Day, the Americans were entertained onshore by Wickaninnish.

During the winter, Gray's crew had foiled an attack planned by a Sandwich Island crew member and the Tla-o-qui-aht people. In final retaliation, on leaving the area, Gray ordered the destruction of 200 homes in the local Opitsaht village. The ship's log noted that Gray had let his passions go too far.

== Archaeological site ==
The winter quarters in Disappointment Inlet (now called Lemmens Inlet) were on the eastern side of the main body of Meares Island, where the geography provided a natural defence against attacks. In Clayoquot Sound, just north of Tofino, Gray named the place Adventure Cove. Researchers identified the site in 1966, and BC officially adopted the name in 1975. At that time, the little island in the cove was named Columbia Islet. Fort Defiance is a protected 135-acre (0.55 km^{2}) archaeological site.

== See also ==
- Robert Gray's Columbia River expedition
- John Kendrick's expeditions
- History of the West Coast of North America
