= Waʔuus Č̓aʔakm̓inḥ Conservancy =

Conservancy in British Columbia, Canada

- Location within British Columbia
- Interactive map of Waʔuus Č̓aʔakm̓inḥ Conservancy
- Location: Alberni-Clayoquot, British Columbia, Canada
- Nearest town: Tofino
- Coordinates: 49°14′35″N 125°54′40″W
- Area: 52 ha (130 acres)
- Designation: Conservancy
- Established: 2024
- Governing body: BC Parks

The Waʔuus Č̓aʔakm̓inḥ Conservancy is a conservancy in British Columbia, Canada. Established on June 18, 2024, the conservancy covers 52 hectares of land. It covers parts of the Meares Island. It borders the ƛułp̓ic Conservancy to its north.

Its Nuu-chah-nulth name Waʔuus Č̓aʔakm̓inḥ (pronounced Wah-oos Cha-uck-min-ha in English) is used in reference to groups of islands with Cypress Bay. Waʔuus is the name of an Ahousaht winter village site (Wahous 19) at the mouth of the Cypre River.
