= Grays Point =

Grays Point may refer to:

== Places ==
In the United States

- Grays Point, Missouri, an unincorporated community in Lawrence County
- Grays Point, Scott County, Missouri, a ghost town
- Grays Point (Washington), a headland on the Columbia River estuary, Washington State

Elsewhere

- Grays Point, New South Wales, a suburb of the city of Sydney, Australia
