= Wanačas-Hiłḥuuʔis Conservancy =

Conservancy in British Columbia, Canada

- Location within British Columbia
- Interactive map of Wanačas-Hiłḥuuʔis Conservancy
- Location: Alberni-Clayoquot, British Columbia, Canada
- Nearest town: Tofino
- Coordinates: 49°11′40″N 125°49′10″W
- Area: 5,366 ha (20.72 sq mi)
- Designation: Conservancy
- Established: 2024
- Governing body: BC Parks

The Wanačas-Hiłḥuuʔis Conservancy is a conservancy in British Columbia, Canada. Established on June 18, 2024, the conservancy covers 5,366 hectares of land. It covers parts of the Meares Island. It borders the ƛułp̓ic Conservancy to its north.

Its name Wanačas-Hiłḥuuʔis is composed of two Nuu-cha-nulth Tla-o-qui-aht place names: Wanačas for Lone Cone which means "flukes of a diving whale", and Hiłḥuuʔis for both Mount Colnett and the shore on Lemmens Inlet on its western slopes which means "as far as you can go" or "something below mountain".
