= Paramotor Inc =

American aircraft manufacturer

- Company type: Private company
- Industry: Aerospace
- Headquarters: Weldon Spring, Missouri, United States
- Products: paramotors
- Website: www.paramotors-usa.com

Paramotor Inc is an American aircraft manufacturer formerly based in Oyster Bay, New York and presently in Weldon Spring, Missouri. The company specializes in the design and manufacture of paramotors.

The company started as an importer of the French Adventure F series of paramotors and also sold the Japanese Daiichi Kosho Beat. It then introduced its own designs, the FX series in the late 1990s.

Today the company produces "ruggedized" paramotors for military and law enforcement customers.

== Aircraft ==
Summary of aircraft built by
Model name	First flight	Number built	Type
Paramotor Inc FX1			paramotor
Paramotor Inc FX2			paramotor
Paramotor Inc FX3			paramotor
Paramotor Inc FX4			paramotor
Paramotor Inc FX5			paramotor
