= Opitsaht =

First Nation community in British Columbia

Coordinates: 49°10′23″N 125°54′23″W

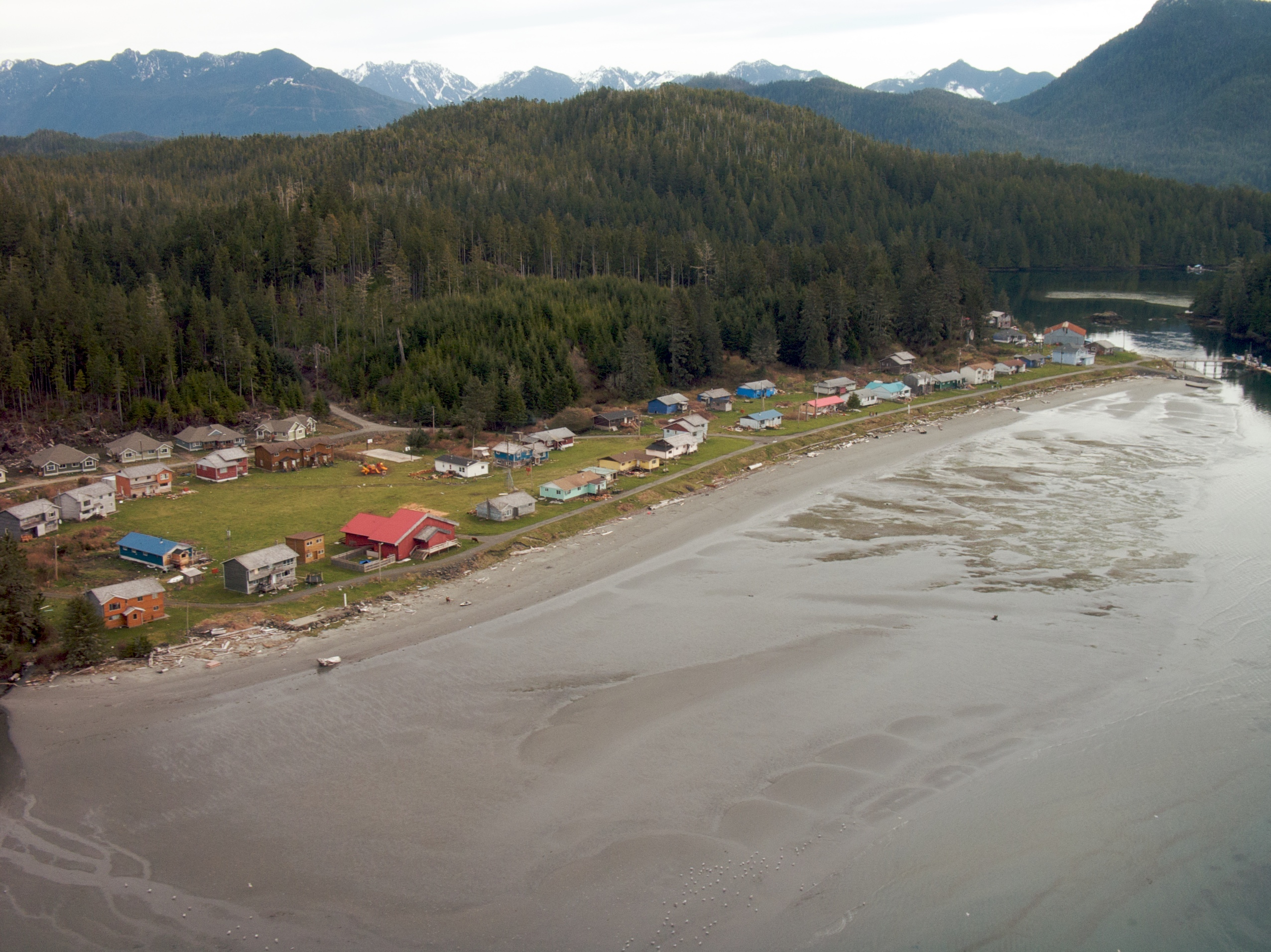
Aerial view of Opitsaht

Opitsaht, spelled also as Opitsat and Opitsitah, is a First Nations settlement/community in the Southwest area of Meares Island, Clayoquot South, British Columbia. This peninsula-like region is the home to Tla-o-qui-aht First Nations of the Nuu-chah-nulth nation. The Tla-o-qui-aht are an Indigenous group from the Pacific Northwest region in the lower Vancouver area, known for their lifestyle revolving around the marine life trade and culture within the community.

During the era of the Maritime Fur Trade, Opitsaht was the seat of Wickaninnish, chief of the Tla-o-qui-aht. In 1791 the Spanish explorer Francisco de Eliza estimated a population of about 2,500 people. According to John Boit in 1792 the village contained 200 ornately carved buildings typical of Nuu-chah-nulth villages. John Kendrick made a strong alliance with Wickaninnish in the summer of 1791. Although Wickaninnish remained an ally of Kendrick, the good feelings towards Americans that Kendrick had built were ruined by Kendrick's former partner Robert Gray. The original village of Opitsaht was lost when Gray ordered it destroyed by the cannons of the Columbia Rediviva as part of a falling-out with the Tla-o-qui-aht when Gray evacuated his erstwhile "fort" nearby on Meares Island, known as Fort Defiance. Today, Opitsaht is one of the main villages of Tla-o-qui-aht First Nations.

The population of Opitsat Indian Reserve No. 1, which is named after the village and is an official land status used by Statistics Canada as a census area, was 174 at the Census of 2006.

== Geography and natural resources ==
=== Environment ===
Opitsaht is located on Meares Island, directly across from the neighboring town and popular tourist destination, Tofino. The settlement is only accessible by boat, or the local water taxi services. The island is large and is home to multiple species of marine life, animal life, and plant species. The main terrain of Opitsaht is a flat area, surrounded by the Arakun Islands, Stockham Island, and Monas Island. These islands are thickly forested by trees ranging from Evergreen Conifer Trees to Shore Pine. The forest is a source of food including fruits and berries.

=== Trade benefits and food ===
Historically, the inhabitants of Opitsaht had good access to marine life including salmon, sea otters, and even whales. These animals were hunted for their fur and skin, and often used as trade goods between the Tla-o-qui-aht people and settlers involved in the Maritime Fur Trade. Their diet was also supported by various plants and animals, such as berries and deer, which were hunted in the forests around Opitsaht. One of the main marine resources was salmon, which the Meares Islands were known to have a plethora of. However, in current times the local salmon population has been drastically reduced. The Clayoquot Sound Canning Company led the expansion in the area, lowering the salmon population.

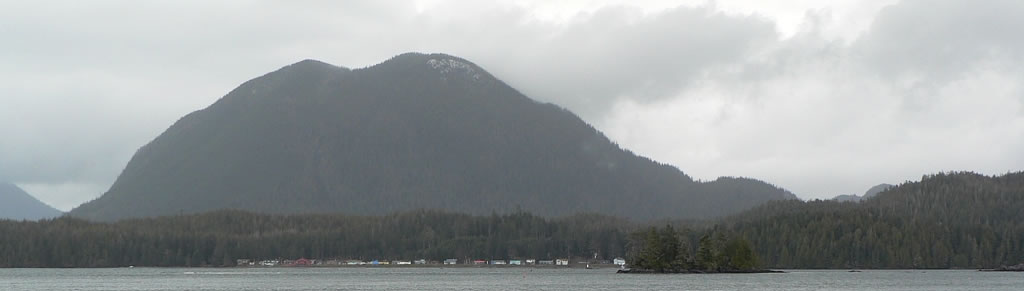
Opitsaht from the Meares Islands

Opitsaht is also home to cows, which never really made their way into Tla-o-qui-aht cuisine and therefore were left alone on the Island. The main Tla-o-qui-aht cuisine was centered around salmon, crustaceans, and other sea and plant life. The marsh-like area isn't common to cows, but have adapted over time and are surviving peacefully in the Meares Islands and Opitsaht, grazing in the beach areas and finding their way around the island.

== History ==
=== Fur Trade and Assimilation ===
The settlement of Opitsaht was a great resource point during the Maritime Fur Trade, a ship based trading system during the popularity of sea otter fur and other marine life usually located around the Pacific Northwest Coast of Alaska. At the same time, Opitsaht was the home to Tla-o-qui-aht chief, Wickaninnish, who was present during the initial European contact in the 1780s. The original village of Opitsaht was destroyed by the American Captain Robert Gray, after tensions arose between the Tla-o-qui-aht people and the European settlers who had made contact. In 1792, the village was destroyed, including 200 (unoccupied) longhouses that were home to 50-100 people each.

The settlers of Opitsaht would soon have to turn to assimilation, with the increased amount of European immigrants spreading throughout the 19th century. Tla-o-qui-aht people were forced onto reservations and residential schools, all various methods to control the Native way of life under The Indian Act. Over time, the Nuu-chah-nulth culture faded, but the Tla-o-qui-aht people, along with the other Nuu-chah-nulth tribes, are continuing to preserve the culture and language of their people.

=== Environment and resistance ===
Environmental tensions arose in the Meares Islands area after British Columbia's government wanted to cut down the old forests in Clayoquot South. The plans started in 1984, but the Tla-o-qui-aht people were ready to defend their tribal land. These old forests were considered tribal ground and ancient woodlands, sparking a resistance and large-scale protest of the area, known as the "War in the Woods". In 2000, the UNESCO declared Clayoquot Sound as a Biosphere reserve, in turn protecting it from industrialization. Opitsaht and the Meares Islands are currently in the Vancouver Islands, British Columbia, and the Tla-o-qui-aht are currently involved in negotiations with the federal government to gain potential independence and the ability to self-govern.

== Tla-o-qui-aht culture and religion ==
Tla-o-qui-aht culture was still prominent after the effects of The Indian Act and various attempts of assimilation by the expanding colonists. Throughout history, the collective bands of the Nuu-chah-nulth nation have had a strong ceremonial culture, often revolving around entertainment and feasting. This includes various songs, dances, and contests. The most popular of these theatricals were Potlatch, ceremonies to distribute and show personal trade goods, develop treaties, and redistribute wealth among internal or neighboring tribes. The federal government banned Potlatch ceremonies from 1884 to 1951, as an addition to the Indian Act. In terms of government and hierarchy, the Tla-o-qui-aht has a history of hereditary leaders known as Ha'wiih, or hereditary chiefs. These special leaders owned the rights to certain ceremonies and stories. The Ha'wiih governed alongside the elected government of the Tla-o-qui-aht nation, consisting of counselors and other elected officials.

The Tla-o-qui-aht people followed a religion similar to those of the Northwest Pacific Coast Indians, centered around the spirits in the world and a higher being. It is believed that every being has a spirit, and therefore should be respected and appreciated. Religious practices are encouraged by the Nuu-chah-nulth nation, with traditional shamans upkeeping ancient medicines and healing rituals.

== See also ==
- Kingfisher
- Meares Islands
- Tofino
- Tla-o-qui-aht
- Nuu-chah-nulth
