= Hirth F-36 =

German two-stroke aircraft engine

- Type: Single-cylinder two-stroke aircraft engine
- National origin: Germany
- Manufacturer: Hirth

The Hirth F-36 is a single-cylinder, two-stroke, carburetted aircraft engine designed for use on ultralight aircraft, especially powered paragliders and ultralight trikes. It is noted for its extremely small equipped weight of 28 lb (13 kg) including exhaust system, reduction drive and carburetor. It is manufactured by Hirth of Germany.

The F-36 was formerly known as the Solo 210, before the design was purchased by Hirth.

== Development ==
The engine uses free air cooling, single capacitor discharge ignition, with a single integral pump-type carburettor. The cylinder walls are electrochemically coated with Nikasil. Standard starting is recoil start with electric start optional. A quadruple V belt reduction drive system is an option with ratios of 1.8:1, 2.0:1 or 2.5:1.

The engine runs on a 50:1 pre-mix of unleaded 93 octane auto fuel and oil and produces 15 hp (11 kW) at 6000 rpm.

== Applications ==
- Adventure F series
- Adventure Wheely II
- Aerosport OY Spider
- Air Est JCD 03 Pelican
- Arey Tatush
- Bailey Solo
- Delta Sailplane Nomad
- D'Yves Yvasion 2000
- Fly Castelluccio Mach
- Fly Products Power
- Fresh Breeze Airbass
- Fresh Breeze Respect 122
- Fresh Breeze Solo
- H&E Paramotores Solo
- Hang Buggy ultralight trike
- Jet Pocket Top 210
- La Mouette SR 210
- MS Parafly Skyward
- Paraavis Pegasus
- Paramania Vortex
- Paramotor Inc FX1
- Paramotor Performance M3
- Parapower Parapower
- Parasport.de Fun
- Personal Flight Sky-Bike
- Phoenix Skywalker 210
- Reflex Solo Elec
- Rotec Rally 2
- Skyrunner Basic
- Spartan BP Parawing
- Southern Skies Spymotor
- Sperwill 210
- UFM Easy Riser
- Walkerjet Super Hawk
- Xplorer Xflyer
- Xplorer XS

== Specifications (F-36) ==
Data from Recreational Power Engineering

=== General characteristics ===
- Type: Single cylinder, two-stroke, aircraft engine
- Bore: 70 mm (2.8 in)
- Stroke: 54 mm (2.1 in)
- Displacement: 208 cc (12.7 cu in)
- Length: 275 mm (10.8 in)
- Width: 359 mm (14.1 in)
- Height: 341 mm (13.4 in)
- Dry weight: 28 lb (12.7 kg) with reduction drive, exhaust system and recoil start

=== Components ===
- Fuel system: 1 X integral pumper carburetor
- Fuel type: Minimum of unleaded 93 octane auto fuel
- Oil system: 50:1 fuel/oil premix
- Cooling system: free air
- Reduction gear: four element cog belt with ratios of 1.8:1, 2.0:1 or 2.5:1 available

=== Performance ===
- Power output: 15 hp (11 kW) at 6000 rpm
- Compression ratio: 10.6:1
