= Adventure SA =

French aircraft manufacturer

- Company type: Privately held company
- Industry: Aerospace
- Founded: 1990
- Founder: Guy Léon-Dufour
- Headquarters: Méré, Yonne, France
- Key people: President: Andrea Testoni
- Products: Paramotors
- Number of employees: Five (2014)
- Website: www.adventure-paramotors.com

Adventure SA (doing business as Adventure Paramotors) is a French aircraft manufacturer based in Méré, Yonne. The company was founded by Guy Léon-Dufour; Andrea Testoni is the current president and general manager. The company specializes in the design and manufacture of paramotors.

The company was founded in 1990 in Paris, France and was one of the earliest manufacturers of paramotors. Their products have been widely sold and achieved a good safety record.

Bertrand et al said of the company in 2003:

Adventure have been around since the beginning of paramotor development. They try to apply professional logic to a discipline which is growing little by little. Beginners will find a well packaged product with no unpleasant surprises. Their paramotor design is a totally well thought out package of engine, wing and backpack. There is a good variety to meet everyone’s needs including a small, surprisingly lightweight, easy to fly trike unit which can be adapted for use with more powerful engines.

== Aircraft ==
Aircraft built by Adventure SA
Model name	First flight	Number built	Type
Adventure A3			paramotor
Adventure A4			paramotor
Adventure F1			paramotor
Adventure F2			paramotor
Adventure F3			paramotor
Adventure F4			paramotor
Adventure R2			paramotor
Adventure R3			paramotor
Adventure R3E			paramotor
Adventure S3			paramotor
Adventure S4			paramotor
Adventure Fly 100			paramotor
Adventure Fly 200			paramotor
Adventure Tiger			paramotor
Adventure X-Race			paramotor
Adventure Wheely II			powered parachute
