= Adventure (1792 ship) =

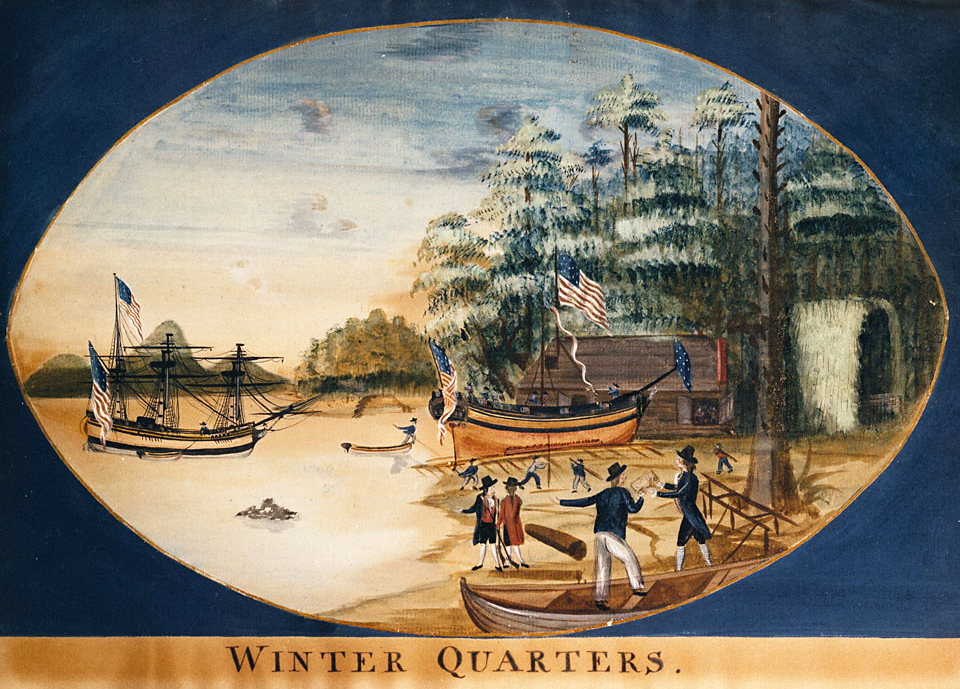
- Launch of the Adventure with Fort Defiance and Columbia in background. Painting by George Davidson, who served as an artist on the Columbia

History

United States
- Name: Adventure
- Laid down: 1791
- Launched: February 23, 1792; Meares Island, British Columbia, Canada
- Fate: Sold to Spain
- Notes: First US ship built in the Pacific NW

Spain
- Name: Orcacitas
- Acquired: 1792

General characteristics
- Class & type: sloop
- Tons burthen: 45 (bm)
- Length: 50 ft (15 m)
- Propulsion: sail
- Complement: 12

Adventure was built by the crew of Captain Robert Gray on his second voyage in the maritime fur trade to the Northwest Coast of North America. The 45-ton sloop was built to allow the trading venture to access smaller inlets the Columbia could not reach. At the end of his second voyage Gray sold the ship to the Spanish Navy. It was renamed Orcacitas (also spelled Orcasitas or Horcasitas) and served the Naval Department of San Blas for some years.

== Construction ==
The skeleton of the craft was brought with the Columbia when it sailed from Boston in 1790. At Clayoquot Sound the crew of the Columbia built the winter quarters that were named Fort Defiance and also began construction of the Adventure. The keel was laid on October 3, 1791, on Meares Island. Over the winter the ship slowly began to take shape. Then on February 23, 1792, the ship was launched, but not without first getting stuck halfway down the ramp. Thus the first American built vessel on the Pacific was launched. The first non-indigenous vessel built on the Pacific Northwest coast was the North West America, constructed in 1788 by Chinese labourers employed by British captain John Meares. Spain had been building ships on the Pacific coast of Mexico since the 16th century.

== First voyage ==
On Monday, April 2, 1792, the Adventure set sail for its maiden voyage. The captain was Robert Haswell, the First Mate of the Columbia. Also assigned to the small ship was Abraham Waters, who became the mate on the Adventure. He had been Fourth Mate on the Columbia. Ten others were assigned, giving the ship a total crew of twelve men.

Only a few weeks after departing from the Columbia, the Adventure rendezvoused on April 17 and transferred 500 skins to the larger ship before separating again. After this the 45-ton ship sailed northward. In July they reached as far north as Sitka Sound in Russian-America. After continued trading, including stops in the Queen Charlotte Islands, the Adventure and crew re-joined Gray and the Columbia near Port Montgomery on September 3, 1792.

== Spanish vessel ==
Shortly after his departure as commandant of Nootka Sound, Juan Francisco de la Bodega y Quadra met Gray in the Columbia with the Adventure in company. The two captains had previously discussed the idea of selling the Adventure, and agreed to discuss it further at Neah Bay, a Spanish outpost in the process of being abandoned. They sailed in convoy to Neah Bay, arriving on September 26. In addition to the Columbia and Adventure, Neah Bay was occupied by the Spanish vessels Princesa, Activa, under Salvador Fidalgo and Bodega y Quadra, and the American vessel Hope, under former Columbia First Mate Joseph Ingraham. Bodega y Quadra and Gray soon agreed to a sale of the Adventure. The bill of sale, dated September 28, 1792, indicates the price was "Fifteen hundred Dollars in kind". The phrase "in kind" meant sea otter pelts. According to Captain Robert Haswell, 75 skins of superior quality were paid by Bodega. John Boit of the Columbia calculated the price as "72 prime Sea Otter Skins worth 55 Dollars each in Canton which is equall to 3960$, which at 50 per Cent advance at home is 7440 Spanish Piasters, which is a good price." Bodega renamed the sloop Orcacitas, one of the names of the Count of Revillagigedo, Viceroy of New Spain. Bodega did not need the vessel himself, but thought it would be useful to the Naval Department of San Blas. Command of the Orcacitas was given to Gonzalo López de Haro, and it sailed in convoy with Bodega's Activa to Monterey, California. They left Neah Bay on September 29.

== See also ==
- Lady Washington
- Nootka Convention
- List of historical ships in British Columbia
