= Paramotor Inc FX series =

FX series

General information
- Type: Paramotor
- National origin: United States
- Manufacturer: Paramotor Inc
- Status: Production completed

The Paramotor Inc FX series is a family of American paramotors that was designed and produced by Paramotor Inc of Weldon Spring, Missouri for powered paragliding.

== Design and development ==
The company started as an importer of the French Adventure F series of paramotors and also sold the Japanese Daiichi Kosho Beat. It then introduced its own designs, the FX series in the mid-1990s. The company currently produces military specification paramotors for sale to governments, the military and police.

The FX series was designed to comply with the US FAR 103 Ultralight Vehicles rules. All models feature a paraglider-style high-wing, single-place or two-seats-in-tandem accommodation and a single engine in pusher configuration. As is the case with all paramotors, takeoff and landing are accomplished on foot.

All models were delivered from the factory with a hand throttle. Options available included a reserve parachute and electric starting. The line was noted for its unusually long three year warranty.

== Variants ==
FX1
Initial model powered by a 18 hp (13 kW) Solo 210 two-stroke engine. Empty weight is 35 lb (16 kg).
FX2
More powerful model with a 22 hp (16 kW) Zenoah G-25 two-stroke engine. Empty weight is 85 lb (39 kg).
FX3
Model with a 22 hp (16 kW) Zenoah G-25 two-stroke engine.
FX4
Model with a 22 hp (16 kW) Zenoah G-25 two-stroke engine.
FX5
Model with a 27.5 hp (21 kW) Zanzottera MZ 34 two-stroke engine.

== Aircraft on display ==
- Cradle of Aviation Museum - FX1

== Specifications (FX1) ==
Data from Cliche

General characteristics

- Crew: one
- Length: 1 ft 6 in (0.46 m) (motor unit only)
- Height: 2 ft 0 in (0.61 m) (motor unit only)
- Wing area: 300 sq ft (28 m^{2})
- Empty weight: 35 lb (16 kg)
- Gross weight: 185 lb (84 kg)
- Fuel capacity: 1.25 U.S. gallons (4.7 L; 1.04 imp gal)
- Powerplant: 1 × Solo 210 single cylinder, two-stroke, air-cooled aircraft engine, 18 hp (13 kW)

Performance

- Cruise speed: 25 mph (40 km/h, 22 kn)
- Endurance: 1:30
- Service ceiling: 10,000 ft (3,000 m)
