= Adventure Wheely II =

French powered parachute

Wheely II

General information
- Type: Powered parachute
- National origin: France
- Manufacturer: Adventure SA
- Status: Production completed

The Adventure Wheely II is a French powered parachute that was designed and produced by Adventure SA of Paris. Now out of production, when it was available the aircraft was supplied as a complete ready-to-fly-aircraft.

== Design and development ==
The Wheely II was designed to comply with the Fédération Aéronautique Internationale microlight category, including the category's maximum gross weight of 450 kg (992 lb). The aircraft has a maximum gross weight of 270 kg (595 lb). It features a 40 m^{2} (430 sq ft) parachute-style wing, two-seats-in-tandem, tricycle landing gear and dual 14.5 hp (11 kW) Solo 210 engines mounted together in pusher configuration driving a single propeller, although other engines can be used.

The aircraft carriage is built from a combination of bolted aluminium and plastics. The propeller is mounted within a two-tube safety ring, with a mesh net set forward to keep objects out of the propeller. In flight steering is accomplished via handles that actuate the canopy brakes, creating roll and yaw. The main landing gear incorporates spring rod suspension.

The aircraft has an empty weight of 70 kg (154 lb) and a gross weight of 270 kg (595 lb), giving a useful load of 200 kg (441 lb). With a fuel capacity of 23 litres (5.1 imp gal; 6.1 US gal) the full-fuel payload for crew and baggage is 143 kg (315 lb).

== Specifications (Wheely II) ==
Data from Bertrand

General characteristics

- Crew: one
- Capacity: one passenger
- Wingspan: 13 m (42 ft 8 in)
- Wing area: 40 m^{2} (430 sq ft)
- Empty weight: 70 kg (154 lb)
- Gross weight: 270 kg (595 lb)
- Fuel capacity: 23 litres (5.1 imp gal; 6.1 US gal)
- Powerplant: 2 × Solo 210 single cylinder, two-stroke, air-cooled aircraft engines, 10.8 kW (14.5 hp) each
- Propellers: 2-bladed wooden, fixed pitch

Performance

- Maximum speed: 55 km/h (34 mph, 30 kn)
- Cruise speed: 55 km/h (34 mph, 30 kn)
- Stall speed: 25 km/h (16 mph, 13 kn)
- Rate of climb: 2 m/s (390 ft/min)
- Wing loading: 6.75 kg/m^{2} (1.38 lb/sq ft)
