= Air Est JCD 03 Pelican =

French single-seat motor glider

JCD 03 Pelican

General information
- Type: Motor glider
- National origin: France
- Manufacturer: Air Est Services
- Designer: Jean-Claude Debreyer
- Status: Production completed
- Number built: 1 (1998)

History
- Developed from: Fauvel AV.36

The Air Est JCD 03 Pelican is a French mid-wing, twin tailed, flying wing single-seat motor glider that was designed by Jean-Claude Debreyer and produced by Air Est Services of Marly, Moselle and supplied as a kit for amateur construction or as a complete aircraft.

== Design and development ==
The Pelican has an unconventional layout, based on the Fauvel AV.36, with a low aspect ratio wing, twin rudders mounted at mid-span and a pusher configuration Solo 210 engine mounted in the rear fuselage producing 9 kW (12 hp).

The aircraft is constructed from fibreglass, with some surfaces fabric covered. The 7.2 m (23.6 ft) span wing is semi-tapered, tapering outside the rudders and employs a Fauvel F4 17% airfoil. The fuselage is just 2.00 m (6.6 ft) in length, making the aircraft very compact. The landing gear is monowheel gear, with a small tail wheel and outrigger wheels at midspan.

With the Solo engine the take-off distance is 180 m (591 ft) and the landing distance 67 m (220 ft). Cruise speed is 93 km/h (58 mph). A variety of engines can be fitted.

In 1998 a completed aircraft was US$12,950 and a kit was US$8,000. The kit did not include the engine, propeller or instruments. Construction time from the supplied kit was estimated at 300 hours. One example was reportedly completed and flying in 1998.

== Specifications (Pelican) ==
Data from Purdy and Bullard

General characteristics

- Crew: one
- Length: 2.00 m (6.55 ft)
- Wingspan: 7.20 m (23.62 ft)
- Airfoil: Fauvel F4 17%
- Empty weight: 84 kg (185 lb)
- Gross weight: 186 kg (410 lb)
- Fuel capacity: 11 litres (2.4 imp gal; 2.9 US gal)
- Powerplant: 1 × Solo 210 , 8.9 kW (12 hp)

Performance

- Maximum speed: 110 km/h (70 mph, 61 kn)
- Cruise speed: 93 km/h (58 mph, 50 kn)
- Stall speed: 45 km/h (28 mph, 24 kn)
- Range: 350 km (220 mi, 190 nmi)
- Rate of climb: 3.3 m/s (650 ft/min)

== See also ==
- List of gliders
