= Grays Point (Washington) =

Coordinates: 46.274551°N 123.770977°W

Grays Point is the western, downstream point of Grays Bay, on the north shore of the Columbia River estuary, at river mile 20, in Washington State, United States of America. Grays Point sticks out slightly and bluntly from the greater headland at the west of that bay. It is wooded, and rises to 151 feet (46 m) height. It stands about four miles northerly from Tongue Point, opposite to it, on the south shore of the estuary, and between four and five miles from Harrington Point, the eastern point of Grays Bay.

Grays Point was charted and named in 1841 by Charles Wilkes. The name honors Captain Robert Gray who, on May 11, 1792, discovered a channel into the Columbia estuary from the Pacific, entered the estuary, and spent nine days upon it, trading for furs with the local Indians. Years after Gray, on November 8, 1805, the Lewis and Clark Expedition landed at Grays Point on their journey west to the Pacific Ocean and camped there for two nights, less than a week prior to arriving at their destination.
