= Adventure Creek =

Stream in North Slope Borough, Alaska, U.S.

Coordinates: 68°51′N 161°09′W

Adventure Creek is a stream in North Slope Borough, Alaska, in the United States. It is a tributary of the Utukok River.

Adventure Creek was named in 1925 when a group of surveyors became lost at the creek.

== See also ==
- List of rivers of Alaska
