= Meares Island =

Island in British Columbia, Canada

Coordinates: 49°10′N 125°50′W

Native name: wančas hiłḥuuʔis
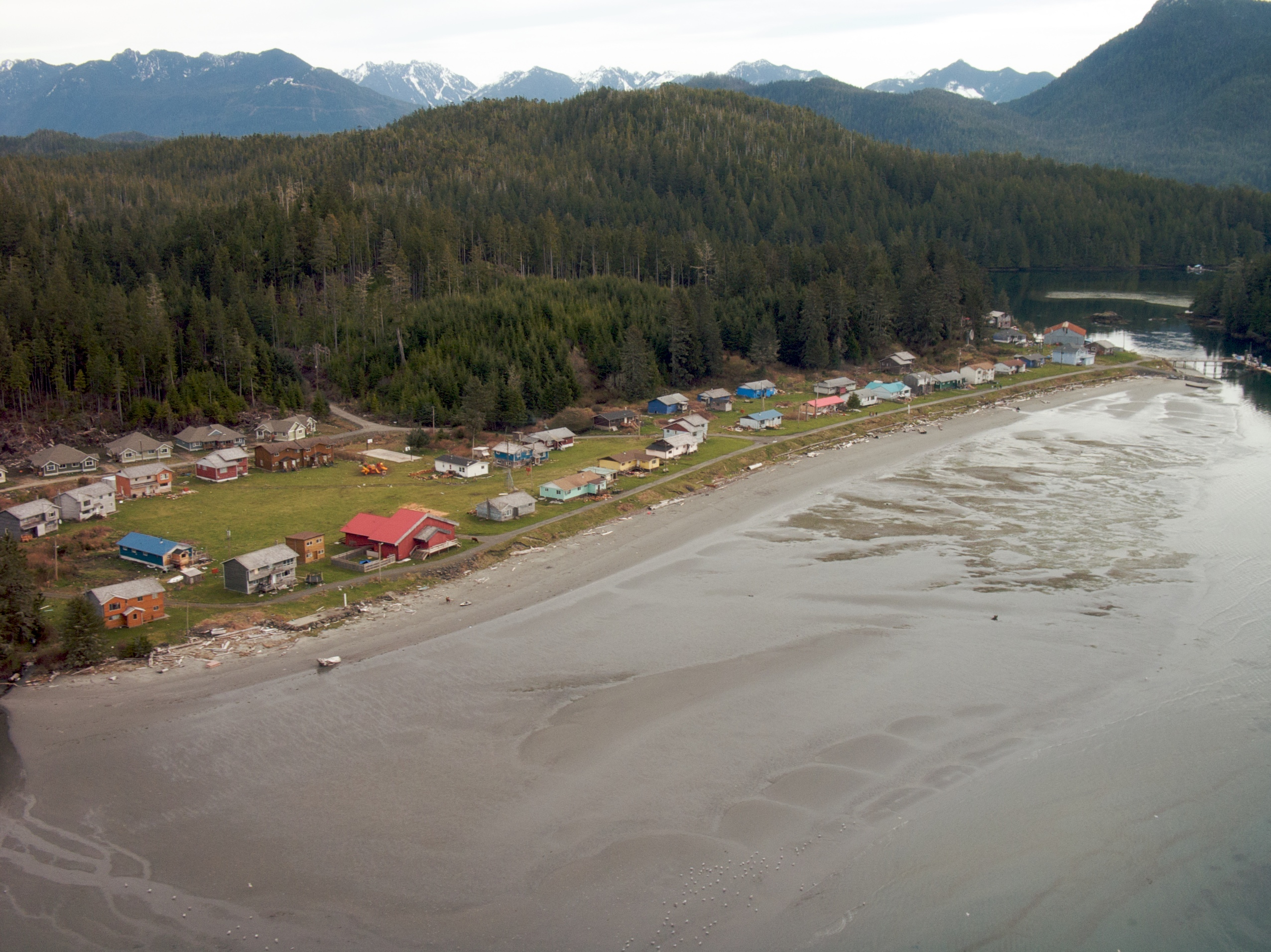
- Aerial view of Opitsaht on Meares Island

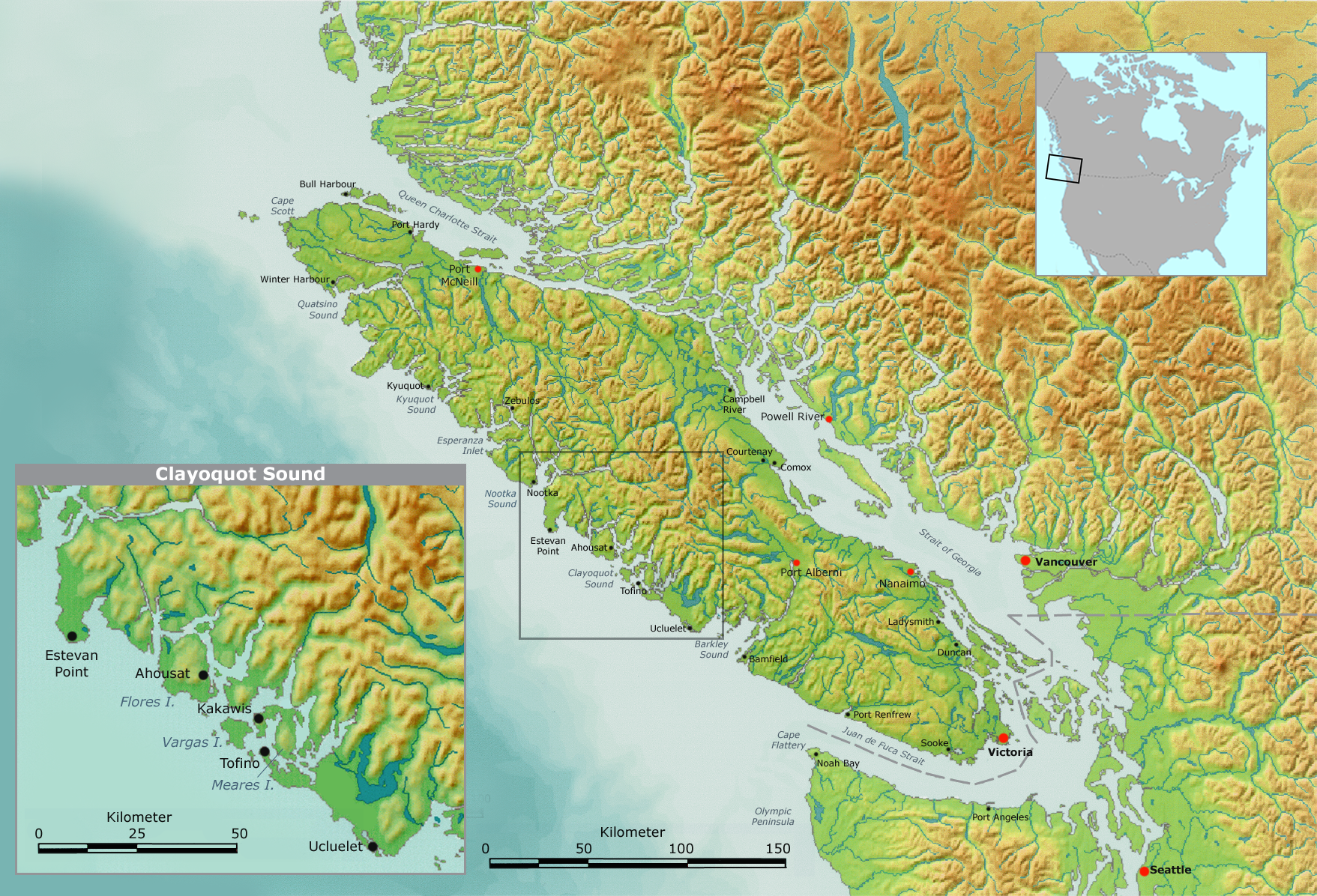
- Map of Clayoquot Sound showing the location of Meares Island

Geography
- Location: Clayoquot Sound

Administration
- Canada
- Province: British Columbia
- Regional District: Alberni-Clayoquot
- Largest Community: Opitsaht

Meares Island (Nuu-chah-nulth: wančas hiłḥuuʔis) is one of the many islands surrounding the Village of Tofino, British Columbia, Canada. Its name was given in 1862 by George Henry Richards, captain of HMS Hecate, in honor of John Meares. The island is located in the Clayoquot Sound region and is the location of Opitsat, the main village of the Tla-o-qui-aht First Nations. Meares Island is reachable by boat or water taxi.

Since June 2024, a large portion of the island is covered by the Wanačas-Hiłḥuuʔis Conservancy and the ƛułp̓ic Conservancy.

== History ==
Between 1791 and 1792, Meares Island was the location of Fort Defiance, an American fur-trading post founded by Captain Robert Gray.

It was the site of an Indian Residential School which opened in 1900. It was initially managed by the Order of St. Benedict (1899—1938), then the Missionary Oblates of Mary Immaculate (1938—1969), before the Canadian federal government took over the management in 1969 and moved the school to Tofino in 1971.

Meares Island gained significant national attention shortly after 1984, when the Nuu-chah-nulth and environmentalist groups such as Greenpeace and Friends of Clayoquot Sound began protesting forestry giant MacMillan Bloedel's potential harvesting activities. The Nuu-chah-nulth, with significant cooperation from environmental groups, eventually erected a blockade, preventing MacMillan Bloedel from logging the island. Both sides pursued legal action, and the court ruled that since the Nuu-chah-nulth had claimed that this was part of their traditional territory, until that claim was resolved, no development could occur on the whole of Meares Island. This essentially granted an injunction in favour of the Nuu-chah-nulth, which was the first time in British Columbia's history that the province had been overruled on a land claims issue. According to Ecodefense, opponents of logging have spiked thousands of trees on Meares Island.

== Geographical features ==
- Lone Cone
- Mount Colnett

== See also ==
- Wanačas-Hiłḥuuʔis Conservancy
- ƛułp̓ic Conservancy
