= Trike Icaros Adventure S =

Brazilian ultralight trike

Adventure S

General information
- Type: Ultralight trike
- National origin: Brazil
- Manufacturer: Trike Icaros
- Status: In production (2013)

The Trike Icaros Adventure S is a Brazilian ultralight trike, designed and produced by Trike Icaros of São Paulo. The aircraft is supplied complete and ready-to-fly.

== Design and development ==
The aircraft was designed to comply with the Fédération Aéronautique Internationale microlight category, including the category's maximum gross weight of 450 kg (992 lb). The aircraft has a maximum gross weight of 420 kg (926 lb). It features a cable-braced hang glider-style high-wing, weight-shift controls, a two-seats-in-tandem open cockpit with a cockpit fairing, tricycle landing gear with wheel pants and a single engine in pusher configuration. The landing lights are mounted in the wheel pants.

The aircraft is made from bolted-together aluminum tubing, with its single surface wing covered in Dacron sailcloth. Its 10 m (32.8 ft) span Trike Icaros Millenium wing is supported by a single tube-type kingpost and uses an "A" frame weight-shift control bar. The seat assembly tilts and has an under-seat baggage compartment. The powerplant is a four-cylinder, air and liquid-cooled, four-stroke, dual-ignition 80 hp (60 kW) Rotax 912UL engine. The aircraft has an empty weight of 180 kg (397 lb) and a gross weight of 420 kg (926 lb), giving a useful load of 240 kg (529 lb). With full fuel of 50 litres (11 imp gal; 13 US gal) the payload is 204 kg (450 lb).

A number of different wings can be fitted to the basic carriage, including the Trike Icaros Omega beginner wing and the high-performance Trike Icaros Xtra.

== Specifications (Adventure S with Millenium wing) ==
Data from Bayerl

General characteristics

- Crew: one
- Capacity: one passenger
- Wingspan: 10 m (32 ft 10 in)
- Wing area: 16 m^{2} (170 sq ft)
- Empty weight: 180 kg (397 lb)
- Gross weight: 420 kg (926 lb)
- Fuel capacity: 50 litres (11 imp gal; 13 US gal)
- Powerplant: 1 × Rotax 912UL four cylinder, liquid and air-cooled, four stroke aircraft engine, 60 kW (80 hp)
- Propellers: 3-bladed composite

Performance

- Maximum speed: 120 km/h (75 mph, 65 kn)
- Cruise speed: 90 km/h (56 mph, 49 kn)
- Stall speed: 52 km/h (32 mph, 28 kn)
- Wing loading: 26.25 kg/m^{2} (5.38 lb/sq ft)
