= Adventure (1834 ship) =

History

Australia
- Name: Adventure
- Owner: John Francis Barrett
- Port of registry: Sydney
- Ship registration number: 10/1835
- Ship official number: -
- Builder: Unknown Brisbane Water, New South Wales, AUSTRALIA
- Completed: 1834
- Fate: Wrecked

General characteristics
- Type: Wood Sloop
- Tonnage: 24 GRT
- Displacement: 24 NRT
- Length: 10.51 m
- Beam: 3.962 m
- Draught: 1.828 m
- Installed power: NA

Adventure was a wooden sloop that was built in 1834 at Brisbane Water. She was wrecked on the coast of New South Wales during a storm in July 1836, but the exact position where she was lost is uncertain.
