= Lone Cone =

Mountain in British Columbia, Canada

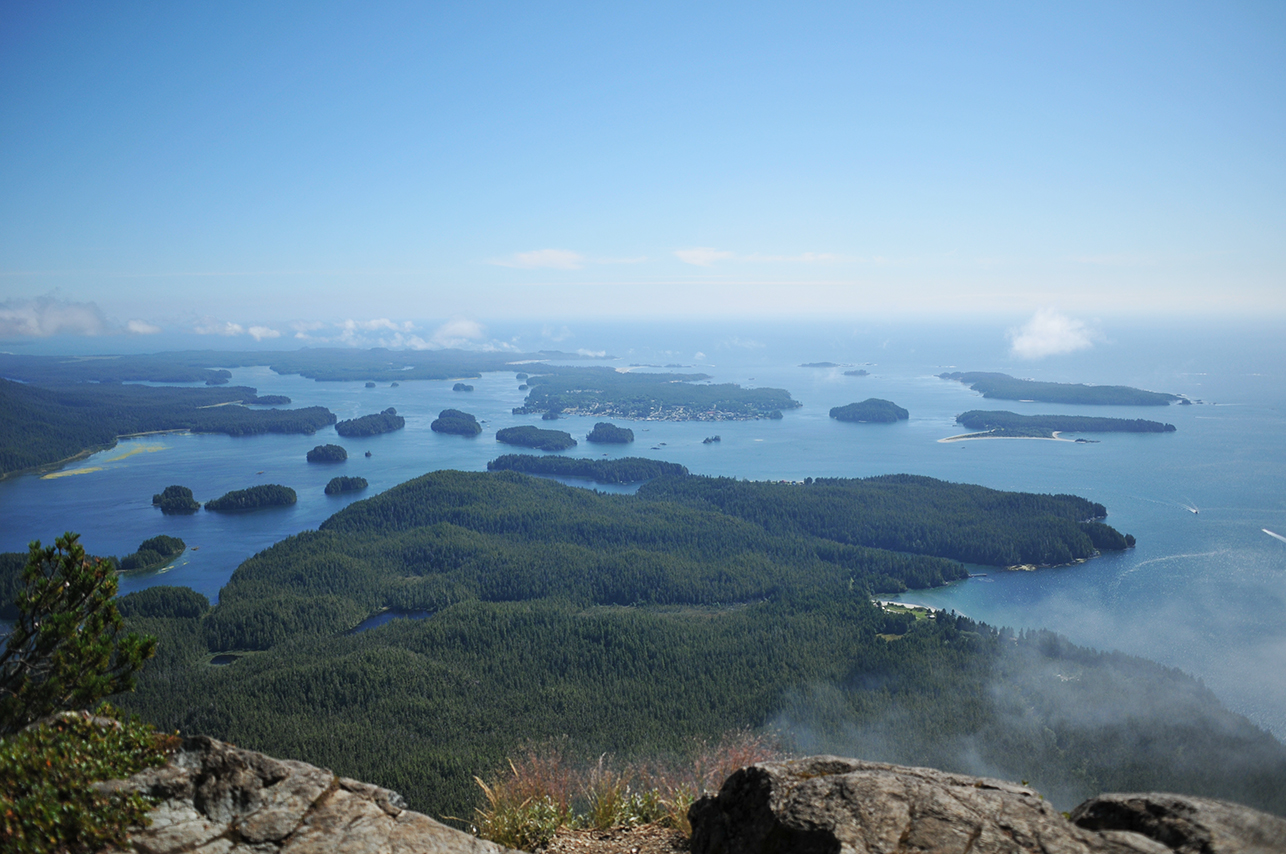
- View looking west from the summit of Lone Cone

Highest point
- Elevation: 742 m (2,434 ft)
- Prominence: 697 m (2,287 ft)
- Coordinates: 49°12′33.8″N 125°54′40.0″W

Geography
- Location: Meares Island, British Columbia, Canada
- District: Clayoquot Land District
- Topo map: NTS 92F4 Tofino

Lone Cone is a mountain located 6 km (4 mi) north of Tofino and 7 km (4 mi) northwest of Mount Colnett on the western peninsula of Meares Island in Clayoquot Land District, British Columbia, Canada. The mountain has always been a noticeable landmark to all inhabitants with its looming presence on the north end of Meares Island. The early pioneers believed that if there were clouds blocking the summit then there would be approaching good weather.

Lone Cone is composed of igneous rock of the Catface Intrusions. These are masses of quartz diorite that intruded the Westcoast Crystalline complex. At least one of them has been dated, at about 41 million years old.
