= ƛułp̓ic Conservancy =

Conservancy in British Columbia, Canada

- Location within British Columbia
- Interactive map of ƛułp̓ic Conservancy
- Location: Alberni-Clayoquot, British Columbia, Canada
- Nearest town: Tofino
- Coordinates: 49°14′20″N 125°50′30″W
- Area: 1,168 ha (4.51 sq mi)
- Designation: Conservancy
- Established: 2024
- Governing body: BC Parks

The ƛułp̓ic Conservancy is a conservancy in British Columbia, Canada. Established on June 18, 2024, the conservancy covers 1,168 hectares of land. It covers parts of the northern coast of Meares Island. It borders the Wanačas-Hiłḥuuʔis Conservancy to its south.

Its Nuu-chah-nulth name ƛułp̓ic, anglicized as Cloolthpich (pronounced Kloolth-pitch in English) refers to a Keltsmaht (Qiłcmaʔatḥ) winter village site shared by the O-inmitisaht (Ḥuuʔinmitisʔatḥ) and Qwatswiaht (Qʷaatsuwiiʔatḥ) before their amalgamation with the Ahousaht (ʕaaḥuusʔatḥ).
