= Adventures Unlimited =

Adventures Unlimited may refer to:

- Adventures Unlimited Software Inc, a 1983 video game company
- Adventures Unlimited Press, a book publisher founded by David Hatcher Childress
