= Adventure F series =

French paramotor designs

F Series

General information
- Type: Paramotor
- National origin: France
- Manufacturer: Adventure SA
- Status: Production completed

The Adventure F series is a family of French paramotor designs that was designed and produced by Adventure SA of Méré, Yonne, for powered paragliding.

== Design and development ==
The aircraft series features a paraglider-style high-wing, single-place accommodation and a single engine in pusher configuration. Take-off and landing is accomplished by foot. The series was designed for portability and as a result is of small dimensions and light weight. All versions can be disassembled to be transported in the trunk of an automobile or checked as baggage on an airline flight.

Factory options available included electric starting, a fuel gauge, quieter four-bladed propeller and the capability to carry a second person in tandem.

== Variants ==
F1
The basic model of the line, powered by a 15 hp (11 kW) Solo 210 engine. The F1 can carry a pilot of 100 to 160 lb (45 to 73 kg). Sold for US$6500 in 2001.
F2
Powered by a 15 hp (11 kW) Solo 210 engine, with the 25 hp (19 kW) Zenoah G-25 engine optional. The F2 can carry a pilot of 130 to 185 lb (59 to 84 kg). Sold for US$7000 in 2001.
F3
Powered by a 25 hp (19 kW) Zenoah G-25 engine, the F3 can carry a pilot of 150 to 210 lb (68 to 95 kg). Sold for US$7000 in 2001.
F4
Powered by a 25 hp (19 kW) Zenoah G-25 engine, the F4 can carry a pilot of 170 to 240 lb (77 to 109 kg). Sold for US$7000 in 2001.

== Specifications (F1) ==
Data from Cliche

General characteristics

- Crew: one
- Wing area: 300 sq ft (28 m^{2})
- Empty weight: 48 lb (22 kg) plus wing weight
- Fuel capacity: 2.5 U.S. gallons (9.5 L; 2.1 imp gal)
- Powerplant: 1 × Solo 210 single cylinder, two-stroke, air-cooled aircraft engine, 14.5 hp (10.8 kW)
- Propellers: 2-bladed composite

Performance

- Cruise speed: 26 mph (42 km/h, 23 kn)
- Rate of climb: 300 ft/min (1.5 m/s)

== See also ==
- Paramotor Inc FX series
