= HMS Adventure =

Twelve ships of the Royal Navy have been named Adventure. A thirteenth was planned but never completed:

- Adventure (1594) was a 26-gun galley launched in 1594 and broken up 1645.
- English ship Adventure (1646) was a 32-gun ship launched in 1646, rebuilt in 1691 and captured by the French in 1709.
- HMS Adventure (1709) was a 40-gun fifth rate launched in 1709 and broken up in 1741.
- HMS Adventure (1741) was a fourth-rate ship of the line launched in 1741, rebuilt as a 32-gun fifth rate in 1758, and sold in 1770.
- HMS Adventure (1763) was a 12-gun cutter purchased in 1763 and sold in 1768.
- HMS Adventure (1771) was a survey ship, originally a collier named Marquis of Rockingham. She was purchased in 1771 and renamed Rayleigh, then renamed Adventure later that year. She accompanied HMS Resolution on James Cook's second voyage to the Pacific (1772–1775). She returned to mercantile service after Cook's expedition; she was sunk in the Saint Lawrence River in 1811.
- HMS Adventure (1784) was a 44-gun fifth rate launched in 1784 and broken up in 1816.
- HMS Adventure was a 10-gun transport launched in 1809 as HMS Aid (1809). She was converted to a survey ship in 1817 and renamed HMS Adventure in 1821. She was sold in 1853.
- HMS Adventure was an iron screw storeship, launched in 1855 as HMS Resolute (1855). She was renamed HMS Adventure in 1857 and was broken up in 1877.
- HMS Adventure was to have been a torpedo ram. She was ordered in 1885 but was cancelled before her launch.
- HMS Adventure (1891) was a river gunboat launched in 1891, transferred to British Central Africa in 1896 and sold in 1921.
- HMS Adventure (1904) was an Adventure-class scout cruiser launched in 1904 and sold in 1920.
- HMS Adventure (M23) was a minelayer launched in 1924. She was used as a repair ship from 1944 and was sold in 1947.

== See also ==
- HMS Adventure Galley
- HMS Adventure Prize
