= Méré, Yonne =

Méré
- Commune
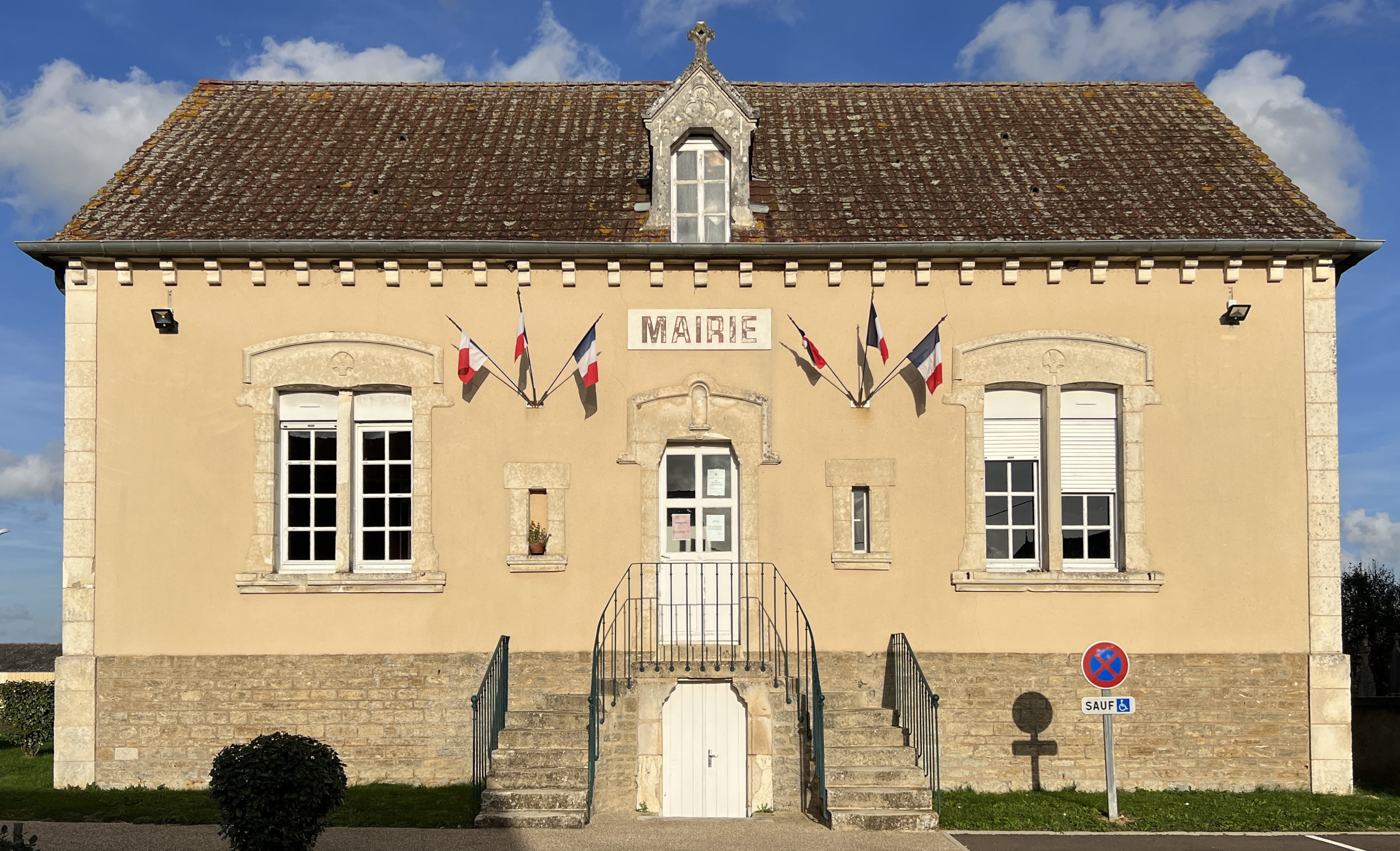
- Méré Town hall
- Location of Méré
- Location within France Location within Bourgogne-Franche-Comté
- Coordinates: 47°53′59″N 3°49′25″E
- Country: France
- Region: Bourgogne-Franche-Comté
- Department: Yonne
- Arrondissement: Auxerre
- Canton: Chablis

Government
  - Mayor (2020–2026): Jean-Philippe Jacquot
- Area^{1}: 11.86 km^{2} (4.58 sq mi)
- Highest elevation: 228 m (748 ft)
- Lowest elevation: 140 m (460 ft)
- Population (2023): 159
  - Density: 13.4/km^{2} (34.7/sq mi)
- Time zone: UTC+01:00 (CET)
  - Summer (DST): UTC+02:00 (CEST)
- INSEE/Postal code: 89250 /89144
- ^{1} French Land Register data, which excludes lakes, ponds, glaciers > 1 km^{2} (0.386 sq mi or 247 acres) and river estuaries.

Méré (French pronunciation: [meʁe]) is a commune in the Yonne department in Bourgogne-Franche-Comté in north-central France.

== See also ==
- Communes of the Yonne department
