= Robert Haswell =

American fur trader (1768-1801?)

- Portrait attributed to James Sharples, c. 1800
- Born: November 24, 1768; Hull, Massachusetts
- Died: 1801? at sea
- Occupations: merchant sea-captain, naval officer
- Spouse: Mary Cordis

Signature
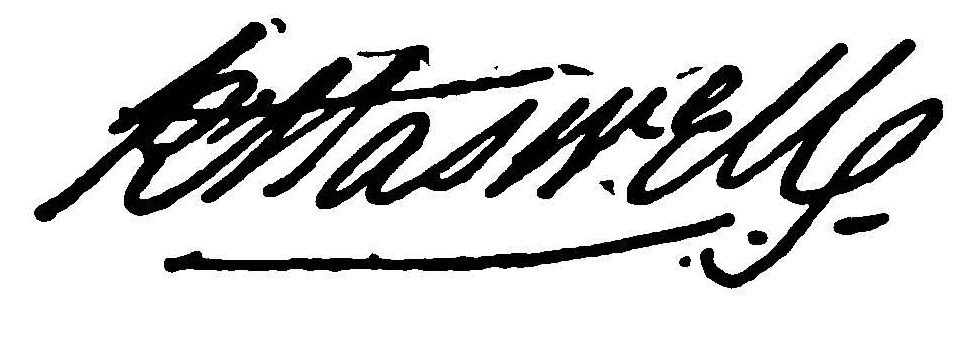

Robert Haswell (November 24, 1768 – 1801?) was an early American maritime fur trader to the Pacific Northwest of North America. His journals of these voyages are the main records of Captain Robert Gray's circumnavigation of the globe. Later during the Quasi-War he served as an officer in the United States Navy.

== Early life ==
Robert Haswell was born November 24, 1768, probably at Hull, Massachusetts, eldest son of Lieutenant William Haswell, a Royal Navy Customs officer, and his second wife, Rachel Woodward. This family had a naval history, Robert's grandfather having been Master Attendant of the royal docks at Gibraltar, and uncle Robert Haswell served as a Royal Navy Post Captain in the early 1780s, while his first cousin was military engineer John Montresor. During the American Revolution, his father was placed under house arrest, at Hull, then detained at Hingham and Abington, and in 1778, the family was sent via Halifax, Nova Scotia back to England, where they took up residence near Kingston upon Hull, and scraped by on the father's half-pay until they received compensation from the British government for the loss of their American possessions.

== Sailor ==
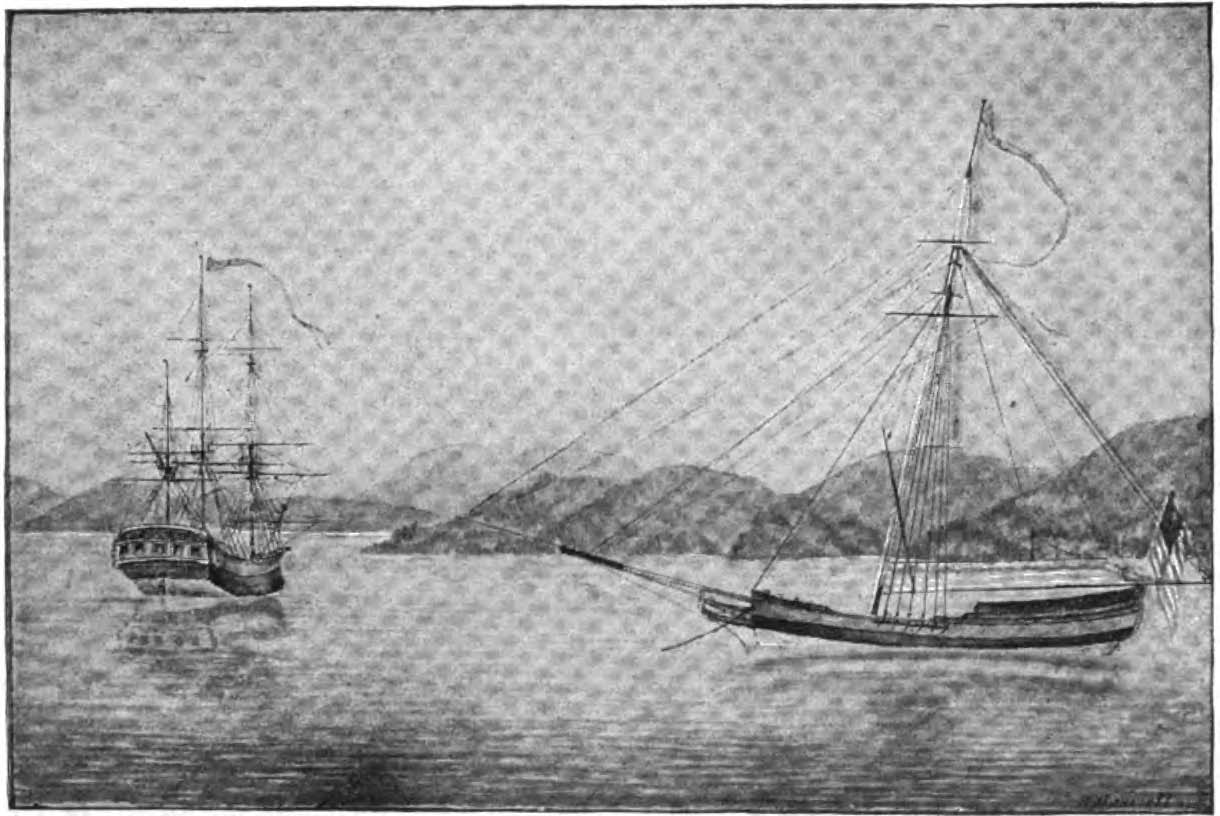
Haswell's drawing of the Columbia and Lady Washington, from his journal

Although the details are obscure, Robert went to sea and ended up in Boston, Massachusetts. There, in September 1787, he was enrolled as third mate on the Columbia Rediviva, a Boston vessel trading fur in the Pacific Northwest, under command of John Kendrick. At the Cape Verde Islands, Haswell's friend and mentor, first mate Joseph Woodruff, squabbled with Kendrick and was dismissed from the ship, but as a consequence Haswell became second mate. Haswell himself then ran afoul of Kendrick over the disciplining of a sailor, and he agreed to be sent home when they reached the Falkland Islands. However, no other ship was present, and Haswell agreed to move to the accompanying sloop, the Lady Washington (Captain Robert Gray). Although still second mate, the move to the much smaller vessel represented a demotion, which Haswell attributed to Kendrick's desire to promote his own son. In this role he cruised up and down the coast, trading for furs. In mid-1789, Gray and Kendrick exchanged ships, and Haswell accompanied Gray on the Columbia across the Pacific, stopping at the Sandwich Isles, and sailing on to Canton, China to sell the furs. They returned to Boston via the Cape of Good Hope and Saint Helena, the voyage being the first American circumnavigation of the globe.

In 1790, the Columbia set out on a second voyage under Gray, this time with Haswell as first mate. After reaching the northwest, in March 1792, a small sloop was constructed, the Adventure. Haswell was placed in charge, his first command, and he again plied the coast for pelts. Adventure was sold the following September, and Haswell returned to the Columbia as first mate for the return home.

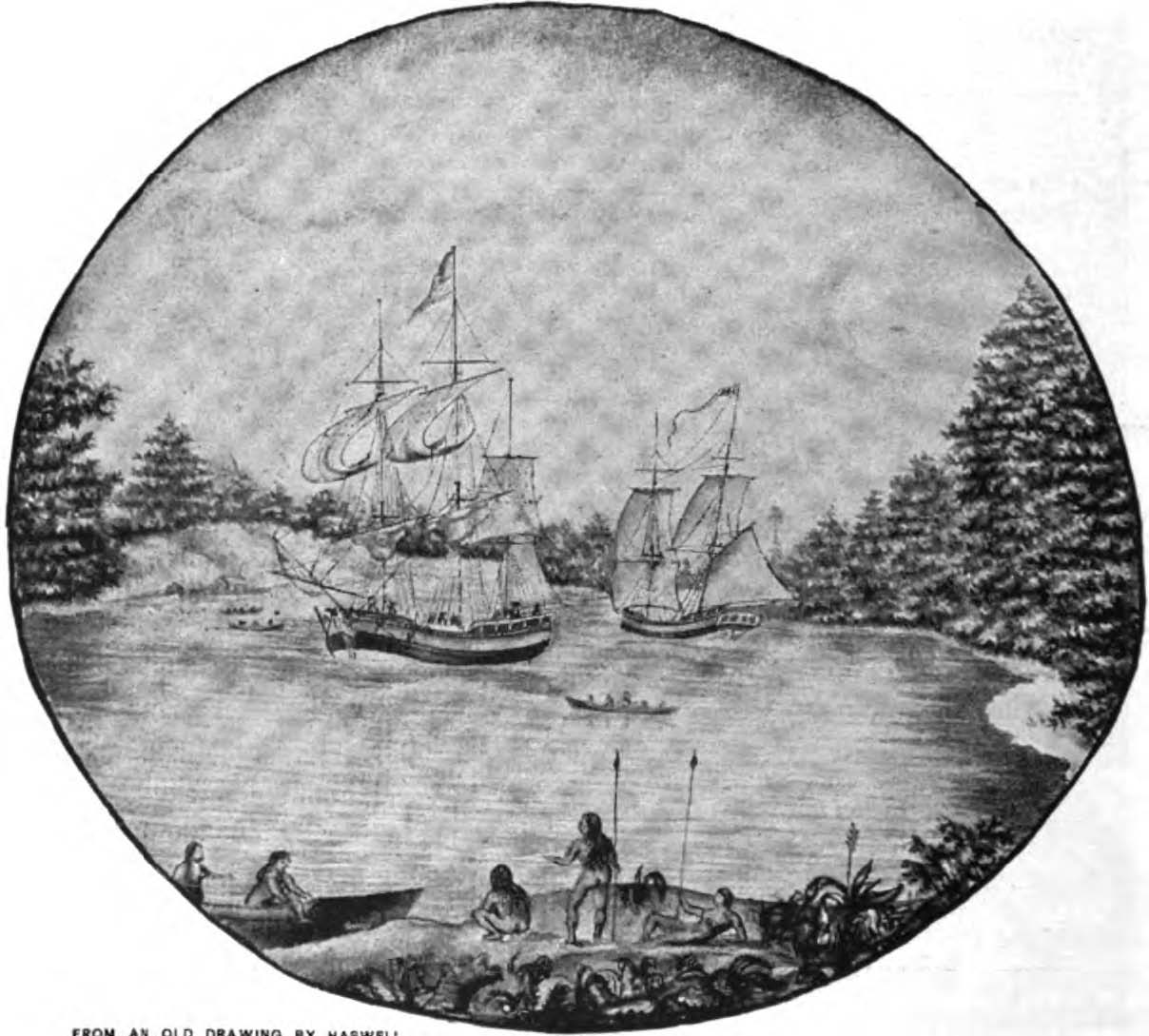
Haswell's drawing of the Columbia and Hancock, from his second journal

On the return of the Columbia from her second voyage, Haswell was given command of the Hannah on a twenty-seven month trading voyage, and next captained the John Jay to the East Indies. He married at Reading, Massachusetts, October 1, 1798, Mary Cordis, sister of former Columbia boatswain John Blake Cordis, and settled in Charlestown, Massachusetts, by her having two daughters, Mary and Rebecca (the latter being wife of John Jones Clarke and great-grandmother of poet E. E. Cummings).

=== Navy service ===
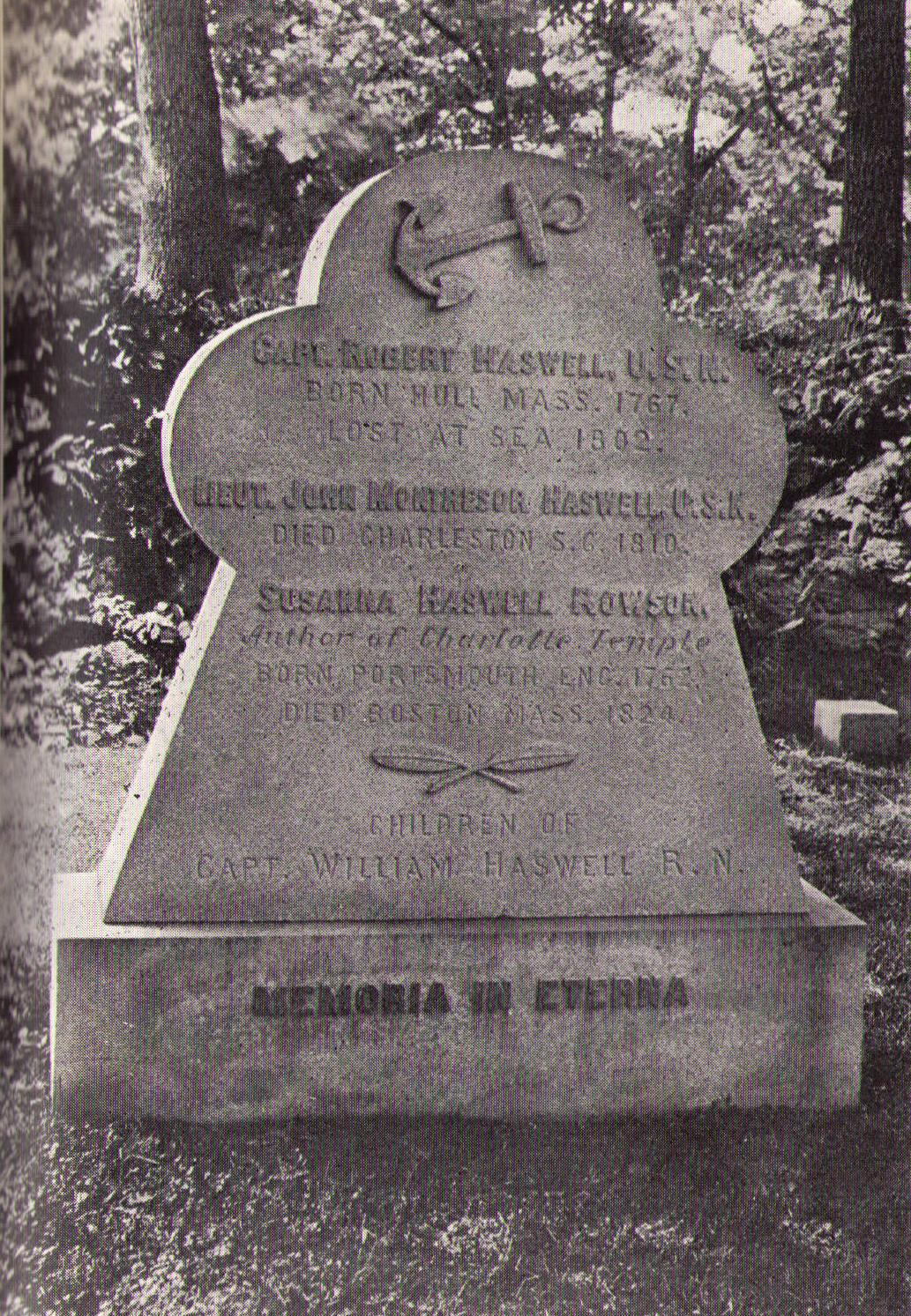
Rowson/Haswell memorial, Forest Hills Cemetery

With the outbreak of the Quasi-War with France, in 1799 he became a Lieutenant in the United States Navy, on the frigate Boston, his brother John Montresor Haswell serving as midshipman. In these roles they were involved in the taking of Le Berceau in October, 1800, in which action brother 'Monty' was severely injured. Following their capture, the French officers singled out Haswell for his gentlemanly behavior toward them. By April of the next year, Haswell was given leave of the Navy to make a trading voyage to India. He took command of the Louisa, bound for the northwest and China. Sailing from Boston in early August 1801, the ship never returned, and it is unclear whether it ever made it to the northwest. Widow Mary joined sister-in-law Susanna (Haswell) Rowson in the operation of her school for girls in Newton, eventually remarrying merchant John Lemist. The family eventually placed a stone memorializing Robert, his brother John Montresor Haswell, and sister Susanna Rowson, in the Forest Hills Cemetery in Boston's Jamaica Plain neighborhood.

== Legacy ==
Haswell is best known for the logs that he kept of his voyages to the northwest. These provide a detailed record of contacts with various native peoples and other European traders, and prove an invaluable source for the history and anthropology of the region. The first of these logs was widely known even among his contemporaries, John Quincy Adams writing in 1790, immediately on the Columbia's return, "One of the passengers it is said has kept a very accurate journal of the voyage . . .", and David Humphreys, United States Minister to Portugal, writing in 1791, "I have been informed by a young gentleman from Boston that a very intelligent and accurate journal was kept by one of the officers on the Washington." It is perhaps noteworthy that, in addition to the famed literary works of his sister Susanna Rowson, Haswell's brother William Haswell also left a noted journal of the voyage of the barque Lydia to Guam in 1801. The full journals of the voyages of the Columbia were published in 1941.
