= Robert Gray (sea captain) =

American Merchant Sea Captain (1755–1806)

Captain Robert Gray
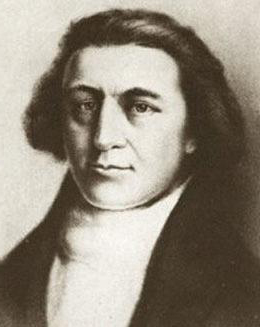
- Captain Gray (Not showing his lack of one eye)
- Born: May 10, 1755; Tiverton, Rhode Island
- Died: July 1806 (aged 51); Atlantic Ocean
- Occupations: Merchant Sea-Captain, Explorer
- Spouse: Martha

Robert Gray (May 10, 1755 – c. July 1806) was an American merchant sea captain who is known for his achievements in connection with two trading voyages to the northern Pacific coast of North America, between 1787 and 1793, which pioneered the American maritime fur trade in that region. In the course of those voyages, Gray explored portions of that coast and in the year 1790 he completed the first American circumnavigation of the world. He was also noted for coming upon and naming the Columbia River, in 1792, while on his second voyage.

Gray's earlier and later life are both comparatively obscure. He was born in Tiverton, Rhode Island, and may have served in the Continental Navy during the American Revolutionary War. After his two famous voyages, he carried on his career as a sea captain, mainly of merchantmen in the Atlantic. He intended a third voyage to the Northwest Coast, but his ship was captured by French privateers, during the Franco-American Quasi-War. Later in that conflict, Gray commanded an American privateer. He died at sea in 1806, near Charleston, South Carolina, possibly of yellow fever. In his honor, many geographic features along the Oregon and Washington coasts were named for Gray, as were numerous public schools established later in the region.

== Early life ==
Robert Gray was born in Tiverton, Rhode Island, on May 10, 1755, to William Gray and his wife. Little is known of his early life.

== Voyage to the Pacific Northwest coast, 1787–1790 ==
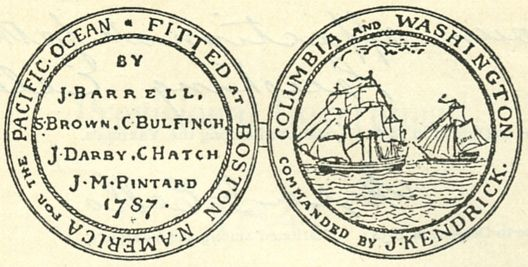
Medal made for Gray and Kendrick to take on the voyage

On September 30, 1787, Robert Gray and Captain John Kendrick left Boston, to trade along the north Pacific coast. Captain Gray commanded Lady Washington and Captain Kendrick commanded Columbia Rediviva. They were sent by Boston merchants including Charles Bulfinch. Bulfinch and the other financial backers came up with the idea of trading pelts from the northwest coast of North America and taking them directly to China after Bulfinch had read about Captain Cook's success in doing the same. Bulfinch had read Cook's "Journals", published in 1784, that in part discussed his success selling sea otter pelts in Canton. Prior to this, other America traders, such as Robert Morris, had also sent ships to trade with China, notably Empress of China in 1784, but had had trouble finding goods for which the Chinese would trade. Bulfinch's learning of Cook's pelt-trading solved this problem, so New England sea merchants expected to trade with China profitably. It is uncertain whether Gray was the first American to visit the Northwest Coast, as Simon Metcalfe of Eleanora may have arrived earlier, perhaps as much as a year earlier.

On the voyage of Kendrick and Gray, the ships' cargo included blankets, knives, iron bars, and other trade goods. Both captains carried official letters from Congress and passports from Massachusetts for their trading voyage. Kendrick and Gray sailed around Cape Horn at the southern tip of South America, first stopping at the Cape Verde Islands and the Falkland Islands in the Atlantic Ocean. In January after passing Cape Horn, the ships encountered a storm that separated the two vessels and damaged Columbia Rediviva. The damage forced Kendrick to sail for the nearest port, Juan Fernandez. Juan Fernandez was a Spanish port under the control of Don Blas Gonzalez commandant of the garrison. There, Columbia Rediviva was repaired before sailing for the northwest coast.

Gray reached the northwest coast in August 1788. He entered Tillamook Bay and came ashore for supplies, making his crew the first recorded European Americans to visit the bay. Fighting erupted with the local Tillamook people, and Marcus Lopez, Gray's black cabin boy and cook from West Africa's Cape Verde Islands, was killed. Gray named the bay Murderer's Harbor.

Further north along the coast, Gray ran aground attempting to enter a river near 46°N latitude. Here the ship was attacked by natives, with the ship losing one crew member before freeing itself and proceeding north. On September 17, 1788, Lady Washington with Gray in command reached Nootka Sound.

Columbia Rediviva arrived soon after and the two ships wintered at Nootka Sound, near what is now known as Vancouver Island. They were still in the vicinity when Esteban José Martínez arrived in early May 1789, to assert Spanish sovereignty. A number of British merchant ships soon arrived, as well, and conflict between the Spanish and British resulted in the Nootka Crisis, which almost resulted in war between the two nations. Martínez seized a number of ships, including Princess Royal. The two American ships were left alone, although Martínez captured a third American ship, Fair American, when it arrived at Nootka Sound in the fall of 1789. Robert Gray witnessed much of the Nootka Incident.

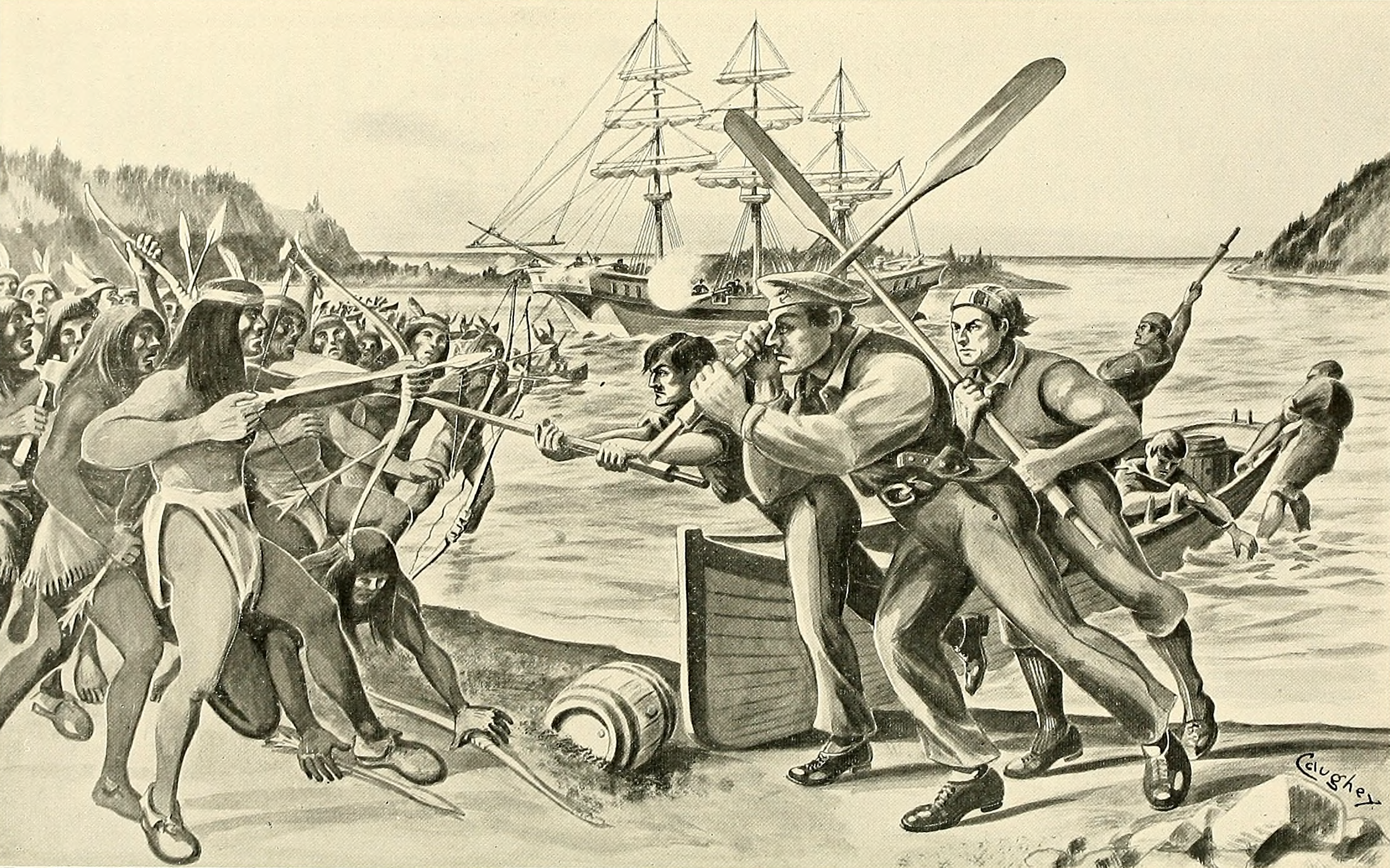
Gray's men battling Native Americans near Tillamook Bay

During their trading along the coastlines of what are now British Columbia, Canada, and Washington, Oregon, and California, United States, the two Americans explored many bays and inland waters. In 1788, Gray encountered Captain John Meares of England. Meares subsequently published reports and maps of the Pacific Northwest that included a voyage by Robert Gray through a large, imaginary inland sea between the Strait of Juan de Fuca and Dixon Entrance. When George Vancouver asked Gray about this in 1792, Gray said he never made such a voyage.

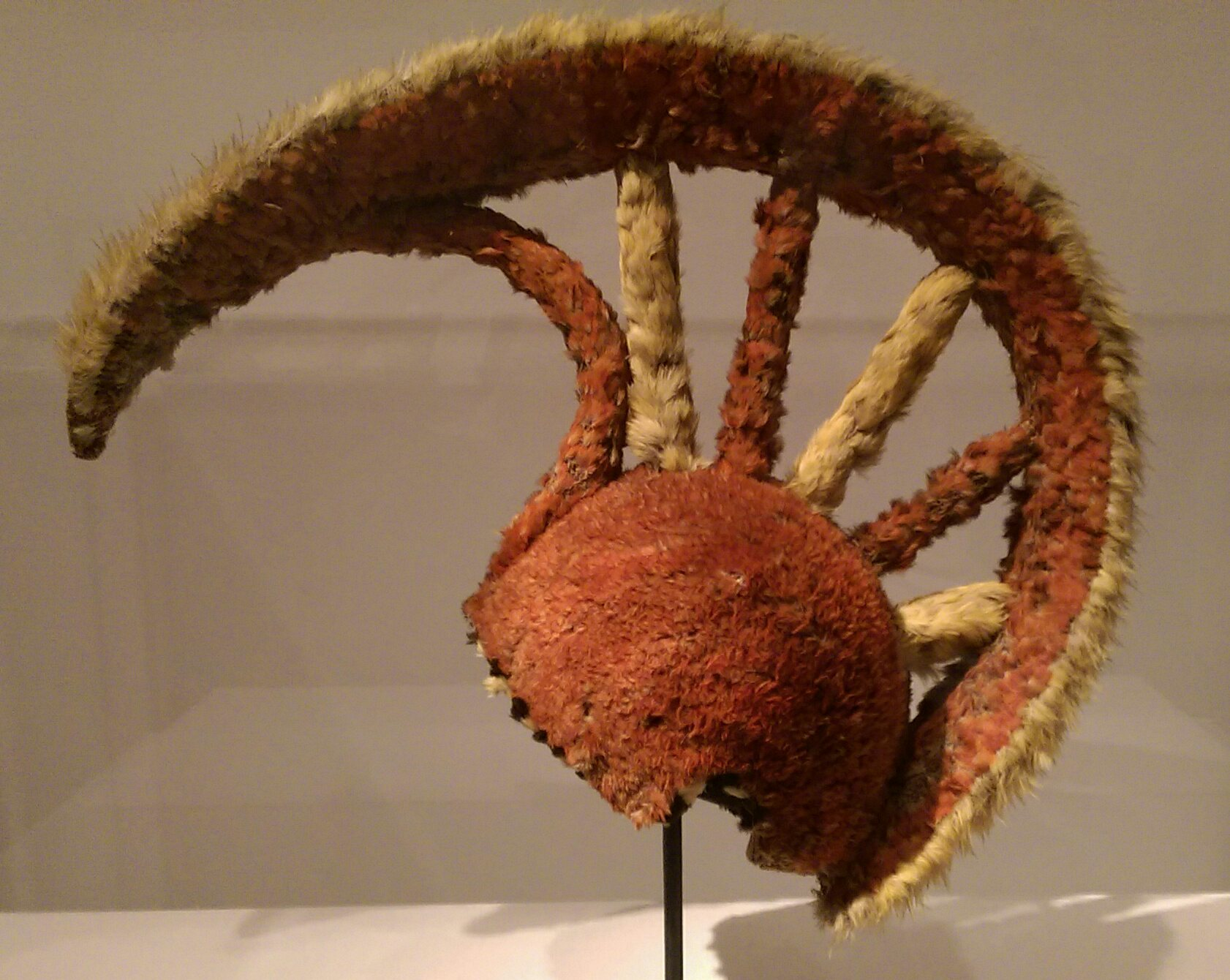
A royal Hawaiian Mahiole, or feathered helmet, collected by Gray in 1789

In 1788, Gray had attempted to enter a large river, but was unable due to the tides. Later he named this waterway as the Columbia River. At the outset of the voyage, Gray captained Lady Washington and Kendrick captained Columbia Rediviva, but the captains swapped vessels during the voyage, putting Gray in command of Columbia Rediviva. After the switch, Kendrick stayed on the North American coast, trading for pelts and furs, while Gray sailed their existing cargo of pelts to China, stopping off at the Sandwich Islands, now known as Hawaii, en route.

Gray arrived in Canton in early 1790 and traded his cargo for large amounts of tea. Gray continued to the west, sailing through the Indian Ocean, around the Cape of Good Hope, and across the Atlantic, reaching Boston on August 9, 1790. As such, Columbia Rediviva became the first American vessel to circumnavigate the globe. Although the commercial venture was financially disappointing to investors, Gray was paraded through Boston for the circumnavigation accomplishment. Accompanying Gray were Hawaiian natives named Atu (Attoo) and Opai (Opie), who had taken passage on Columbia Redivivaand were the first Hawaiians to visit New England. Gray had Atu paraded through the streets of Boston, dressed in traditional Hawaiian war dress. Governor John Hancock held a reception in honor of Gray and his circumnavigation achievement.

Also on this voyage, Kendrick and Gray were instructed to purchase as much land as they could from native Indians in the Northwest region. Kendrick made at least five such purchases over the summer of 1791, from Maquinna, Wickaninnish, and other chiefs of the Nuu-chah-nulth people. Collectively, these purchases gave Kendrick title to over 1,000 square miles (2,600 km^{2}) of Vancouver Island, including almost the entirety of Nootka Sound and Clayoquot Sound. These purchases occurred while Gray had completed his voyage and since returned.

The success in profits realized by this voyage had the most immediate effect of Gray's setting out for the north Pacific coast again, only six weeks after returning thence. The further effect was that other New England sea merchants began to send vessels of their own to take part in this new trade opportunity, including the dispatch of the brigantine Hope in September 1790, under the command of Joseph Ingraham, Gray's first mate on his first voyage. Within a few years, many Yankee merchants were involved in the continuous trade of pelts to China, and by 1801, 16 American vessels were engaged in this triangular route. These mercantile activities encroached upon territorial claims by other nations to this disputed region, notably those of Spain and Russia, and in the coming years, they would be used in support of American claims to the Oregon Country, and would contribute to the limiting to California and to Alaska, respectively, of the Spanish and Russian claims.

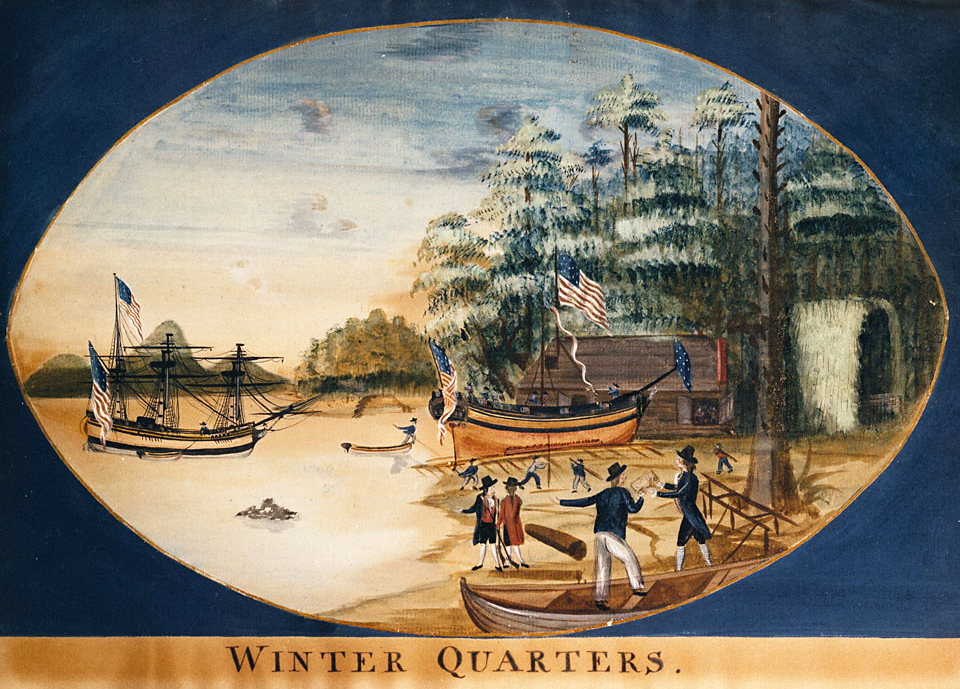
Winter Quarters, established by Capt. Gray and the crew of Columbia Rediviva in Adventure Cove in Clayoquot Sound; painting circa 1793, by George Davidson

== Return to the Pacific Northwest coast, 1790–1793 ==
Gray set sail for the northwest coast again in the Columbia on September 28, 1790, reaching his destination in 1792. Gray and Kendrick rejoined each other for a time, after Gray's return to the region. On this voyage, Gray, though he was still a private merchant, was sailing under papers of the United States of America signed by President George Washington. Gray put in at Nootka Sound on June 5, 1791, and wintered at a stockade they built and named Fort Defiance. Over this winter, the crew built a 45-ton sloop named Adventure, which was launched in the spring with Gray's first mate, Robert Haswell, in charge. He sailed as far north as Haida Gwaii during his voyage.

Once April came, Gray and Columbia Rediviva sailed south while Adventure sailed north. After wintering on Vancouver Island, Gray set sail again on April 2, 1792, when he left the trading post of Clayoquot. As he departed, Gray ordered the destruction of the Nuu-chah-nulth (Nootka) village of Opitsitah (Opitsaht). The attack was a retaliation for insults he thought he had endured and in response to rumors of a plot against his men conceived by some local natives and a Sandwich Islander of his own crew. The plot may have been real, but might have been a misunderstanding. The village of Opitsaht, which consisted of about 200 houses with much carved work—a "fine village, the Work of Ages", according to Gray's officer John Boit, which was "in a short time totally destroy'd". Fortunately, it was deserted at the time. John Boit, the keeper of his own ship's log, wrote that Gray had let his passions go too far. In 2005, descendants of Gray formally apologized for the destruction of Opitsaht. Gray ordered several other attacks during the 1792 voyage. In May 1792, Gray ordered an attack on a Chicklisaht Nuu-chah-nulth village in Esperanza Inlet or Nasparti Inlet north of Nootka Sound, killing seven and seizing the natives' sea otter furs. The Chicklisaht took their wounded to the Spanish post at Nootka Sound and asked the commandant, Bodega y Quadra, to punish Gray. This attack came after a breakdown in trading negotiations. The price of sea otter furs had increased dramatically since the late 1780s. Gray was one of a number of captains who decided to use force to acquire furs. Later in 1792, in Grays Harbor, Captain Gray fired on a group of Chinooks, killing 20. Still later, in Clayoquot Sound again, Gray killed or wounded at least 25 natives who were approaching his ship in a war canoe during the night. He battled a group of Kwakiutls in late 1792.

During his 1792 journey aboard Columbia Rediviva, Gray noticed muddy waters flowing from shore and decided to investigate whether he might have encountered the "Great River of the West". While waiting for favorable weather, on April 29, Gray spotted a ship and exchanged greetings with her. This ship was HMS Discovery, commanded by British naval officer Captain George Vancouver. The two captains met and discussed the geography of the coastlines: Gray told Vancouver about the large river he had attempted to enter in 1788, but Vancouver doubted a large river was at that latitude. So Gray continued south, leaving the Strait of Juan de Fuca on April 30, 1792, trading for more pelts as the ship sailed. On May 7, he took Columbia Rediviva into the estuarine bay of Grays Harbor, Washington. (Gray himself actually named this Bullfinch Harbor, but Vancouver's after-the-fact choice was the name that stuck.)

=== Entering the Columbia ===
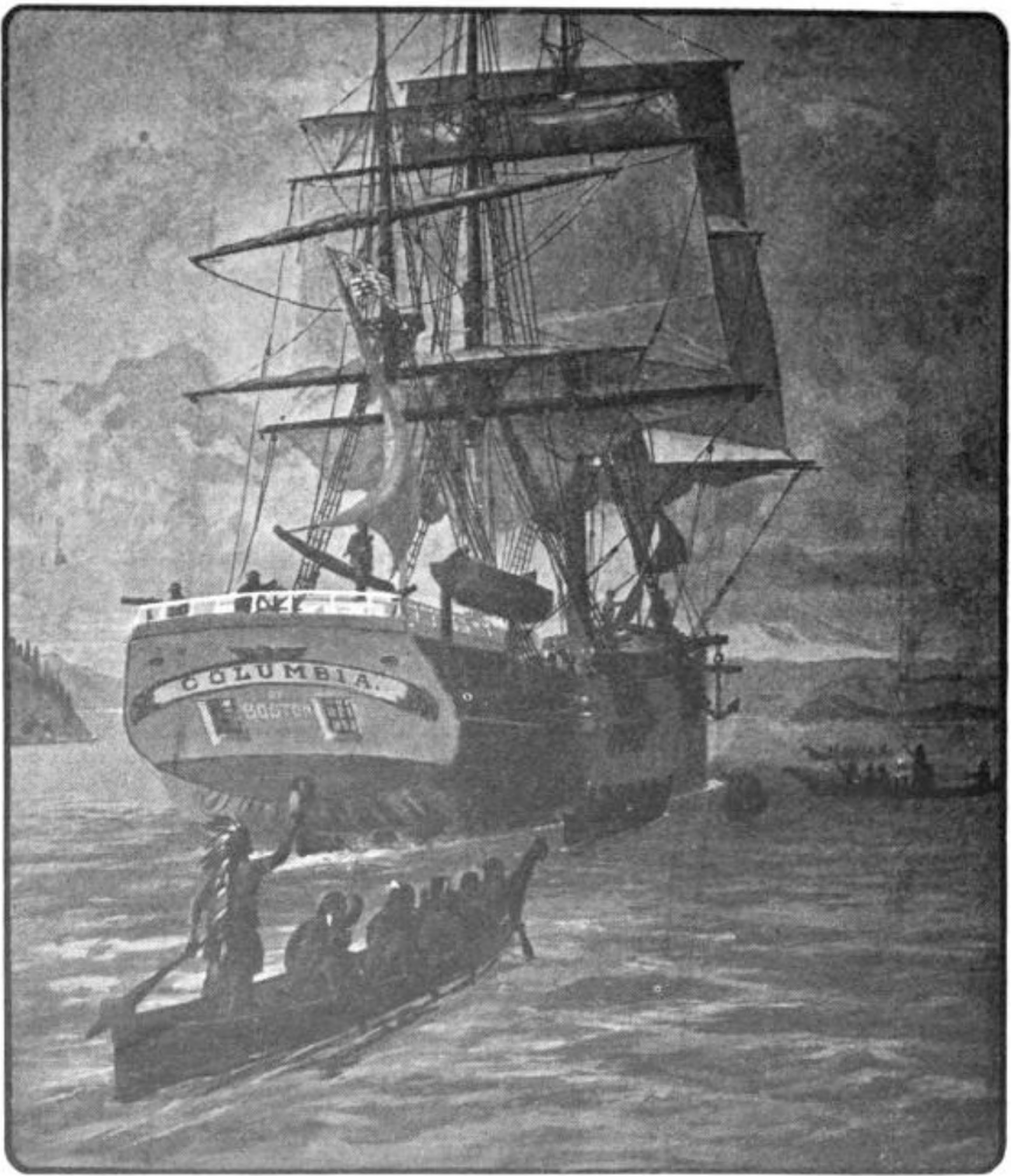
Sketch of Columbia Rediviva on the river bearing her name

Afterward, Gray carried on south to what was, he rightly suspected, the mouth of a great river, and looked further for a way into this river. On May 11, his men discovered what he sought, and he ordered a small sailboat launched to attempt to find a safe passage across the sand bars in the process known as sounding. Finally, on the evening of May 11, 1792, Gray's men found a safe channel, so ship and crew sailed into the estuary of the Columbia River. Once there, they sailed upriver and Gray named this large river Columbia after his ship.

After entering the Columbia, they were met by many natives in their canoes, while the crew prepared to take on fresh water. The ship and crew traveled about 13 mi (21 km) upriver and traded items such as nails for pelts, salmon, and animal meat over a nine-day period. In addition to naming the river, Gray also named other landmarks such as Adams Point and Cape Hancock. However, many of these places have since been renamed. The farthest point Gray explored upriver is now known as Grays Bay, and the river that flows into it Grays River. These names were not given by Gray, but by William Broughton, George Vancouver's lieutenant, who explored the Columbia in October 1792. Robert Gray had made a chart of the bay and the mouth of the river and a copy was acquired by Vancouver.

Gray's success in entering the river would eventually form part of the basis for U.S. territorial claims to the Oregon Country. On May 20, Gray and crew sailed from the Columbia, heading north to rendezvous with their sloop Adventure before setting sail for China.

=== At Nootka Sound ===
On July 22, 1792, Gray sailed Columbia Rediviva into the Nootka Sound accompanied by Hope under Ingraham. Juan Francisco de la Bodega y Quadra was present as the commandant of the Spanish settlement there. Bodega was awaiting the arrival of George Vancouver so the two could implement the first Nootka Convention. Bodega had intended to turn over the entire establishment to Vancouver, but while waiting for Vancouver, he began to change his mind. Over the summer, Bodega had begun to realize that John Meares had not only greatly exaggerated his losses during the Nootka Crisis, but also had operated British trading ships under the flag of Portugal in violation of East India Company regulations. When Gray and Ingraham arrived at Nootka, Vancouver was still en route. Bodega took the opportunity to ask the Americans if they would give him their account of the events of 1789 that led to the Nootka Crisis. Ingraham answered Bodega's letter at length. He wrote, "as I knew every circumstance, Captain Gray desired I would answer and he would sign it jointly."

According to the letter signed by Ingraham and Gray, Meares had made many false claims about the events of 1789. The Portuguese ships, Ingraham said, were definitely British ships flying Portuguese flags. The "house" that Meares said he built at Nootka Sound, and which was explicitly mentioned in the Nootka Convention, was only a "rough hut", built and torn down in 1788. By 1789, when the Spanish arrived, "there was no vestige of any house remaining". The Nootka Convention said that Spain had seized buildings and that these must be restored to Britain. Further, Ingraham wrote that Meares had not purchased any land from Maquinna, as claimed. About the arrest of James Colnett by Esteban José Martínez, Ingraham and Gray wrote that Colnett had insulted and threatened Martínez, and that Colnett had drawn his sword on Martínez, justifying Colnett's arrest. The letter closed with a statement of friendship: "We sincerely hope, sir, when things are represented with truth, it will rescue our friend Don Estevan J. Martínez from censure... As to the treatment of the Americans by Don Estevan, we have ever testified to it in terms due to such hospitality, and we are again happy to have it in our power to do what we deem justice to his conduct." The Americans were not a neutral party; the United States had only gained its independence from Britain through war a few years before. Also, the Americans were in direct competition with the British, but not the Spanish, for the fur trade of the Northwest coast. It was in their interest to support the Spanish case.

Bodega was pleased to receive Ingraham and Gray's account. Once Vancouver arrived, Bodega used the report, along with other tactics, to force Vancouver into a diplomatic deadlock once negotiations had begun. Were it not for Ingraham and Gray's letter, along with Vancouver's late arrival, and several other factors, Bodega likely would have turned the entire Spanish establishment at Nootka over to the British. Instead, Bodega offered only to turn over the small cove where Meares had built his hut in 1789. Vancouver could not accept this. In the end, the two agreed to let their governments work it out. As a result, the settlement at Nootka remained Spanish for several years, until under the third Nootka Convention both nations agreed to abandon the port.

While Gray was at Nootka Sound, Bodega provided a small house near his own. Gray stayed there until he left Nootka Sound. In addition, Bodega had Columbia Rediviva repaired by the Spanish caulkers, blacksmiths, and carpenters. Bodega also provided fresh food, such as vegetables and hot bread, every day. When Gray and Ingraham left, they were given large amounts of food, such as salmon, pork, eggs, butter, fresh bread, wine, brandy, and large amounts of cabbage and salad. Bodega refused any payment for any of his services. Ingraham wrote in his journal, "Considering the part of the world we were in, I thought this a very handsome present. Not a day passed during our stay in this port, but every ship—without respect to nation or person—received marks of Don Juan's hospitality."

In September, most of the ships that had visited Nootka Sound left, including Columbia Rediviva, under Gray, along with the sloop Adventure. Bodega also left, on Activa. Bodega and Gray met shortly after leaving and agreed to sail to Neah Bay where, in the last week of September, Bodega purchased Adventure from Gray. After this, Gray took the Columbia across the Strait of Juan de Fuca to Port San Juan (today the site of Port Renfrew, British Columbia), where the final preparations were made for the long voyage across the Pacific. Gray left North America on October 3, 1792, arriving in the Hawaiian Islands on October 29, and in Macau on December 8.

=== Return to Boston ===
In Canton, Gray again traded his cargo for tea, and then sailed west towards the Atlantic Coast of the United States. Gray returned to Boston in July 1793, after again circumnavigating the globe. On February 3, 1794, he took a wife named Martha Atkins, in a marriage performed in Boston by the Reverend John Eliott. The couple had five children together.

== Role in the Quasi-War ==
Later in his career, Gray was involved in the Franco-American Quasi-War of 1798–1800, an undeclared and purely maritime conflict related to the Napoleonic Wars.

On September 10, 1798, Gray set sail from Salem in command of the bark Alert, on another trading voyage bound for the Northwest Coast, where he was meant to spend a season or two fur-trading, and thence for Canton and home again, as before. This voyage was cut short while yet outbound, though, by the capture of Gray's ship in the South Atlantic by a French privateer. Alert was taken by La Republicaine on November 17, about 500 mi (800 km) east of Rio de Janeiro, then sailed by a prize crew (though under Gray's command) to the Spanish port of Montevideo, on the Río de la Plata, arriving on December 14. There, Alert and its cargo were sold as prizes of the French ship. Alert left port on January 11, with a Spanish crew under the Spanish flag, bound for the Pacific. Gray returned to the United States and went on with his sailing career.

In 1799, Gray commanded the privateer Lucy in the continuing issue with the French. Lucy was a 12-gun ship with a crew of 25.

== Later voyages and death ==
On November 21, 1800, Gray left Boston in command of the schooner James, with a cargo of iron and stone ballast, bound for Rio de Janeiro, where he arrived on April 18, 1801. He also made subsequent voyages to England and the southern United States. Gray died at sea in 1806, near Charleston, South Carolina. The cause of his death is believed to have been yellow fever. He left behind his wife and four daughters, who later petitioned the U.S. Congress for a government pension, based on his voyages and a claim that he was a naval officer for the Continental Navy during the Revolutionary War.

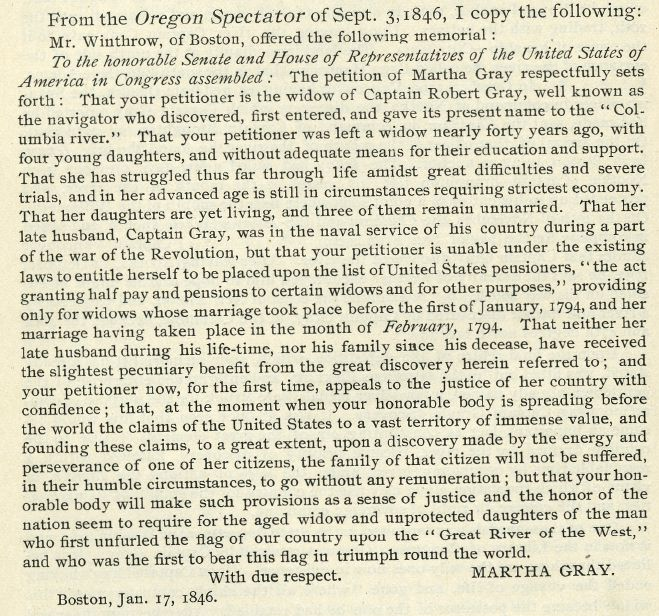
Martha Gray's petition to Congress

== Legacy ==
Gray did not publish his geographic discoveries on the Columbia River, nor those elsewhere along the Pacific coast. Captain Vancouver did publish Gray's discoveries in England, along with his own explorations, and gave Gray credit. At the time, these discoveries by Gray did not gain him any renown nor were thought to be important. However, the trading opportunities Gray pioneered (in regard to Americans) were soon followed up by other New England merchants, with the result that the Indians of the Northwest Coast came to call Americans "Boston men". Moreover, Gray's priority in entering of the Columbia was later used by the United States in support of its territorial claims to what Americans called the Oregon Country. The rival British claimants called the more southerly portion of this disputed area the Columbia District, which they derived from the river-name chosen by Gray. Columbia District eventually lent itself to the name of the mid-19th-century colony of British Columbia. When that colony joined Canada in 1871, it became the existing province of British Columbia.

=== Namesakes ===
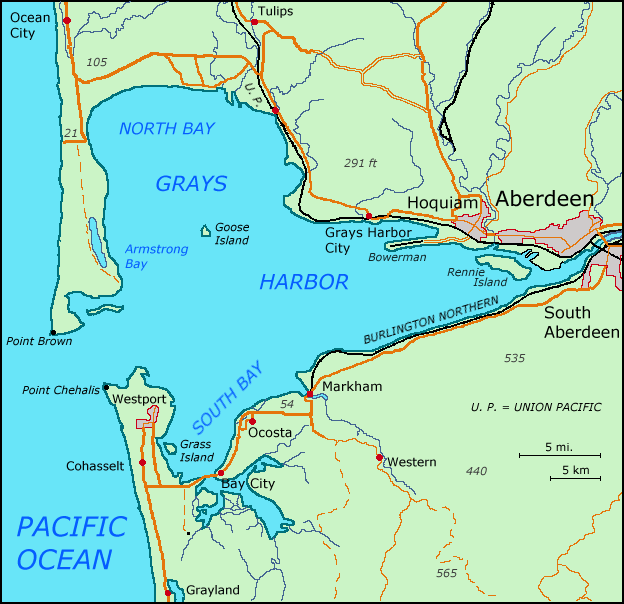
Map of Grays Harbor in Washington

- Grays Harbor and Grays Harbor County, in Washington
- Grays Bay, on the north shore of the Columbia River estuary
- Grays Point, at the west of Grays Bay
- Grays River, a tributary of the Columbia River, flowing into Grays Bay
- Grays River, Washington, a small, unincorporated rural village on the river of the same name
- The Robert Gray Neighborhood Tiverton, Rhode Island
- Robert Gray Avenue in Tiverton, Rhode Island
- Robert Gray Middle School in Portland, Oregon
- Robert Gray Middle School in Tacoma, Washington
- Captain Robert Gray Elementary in Astoria, Oregon
- Robert Gray Elementary School in Aberdeen, Washington
- Robert Gray Elementary School in Longview, Washington
- Robert Gray Baptist Church in Longview, Washington
- Captain Gray Elementary School in Pasco, Washington
- Grayland, WA a small unincorporated area on the Washington Coast between Grays Harbor and Willapa Bay

== See also ==
- History of the west coast of North America
