= Columbia Rediviva =

American sailing vessel

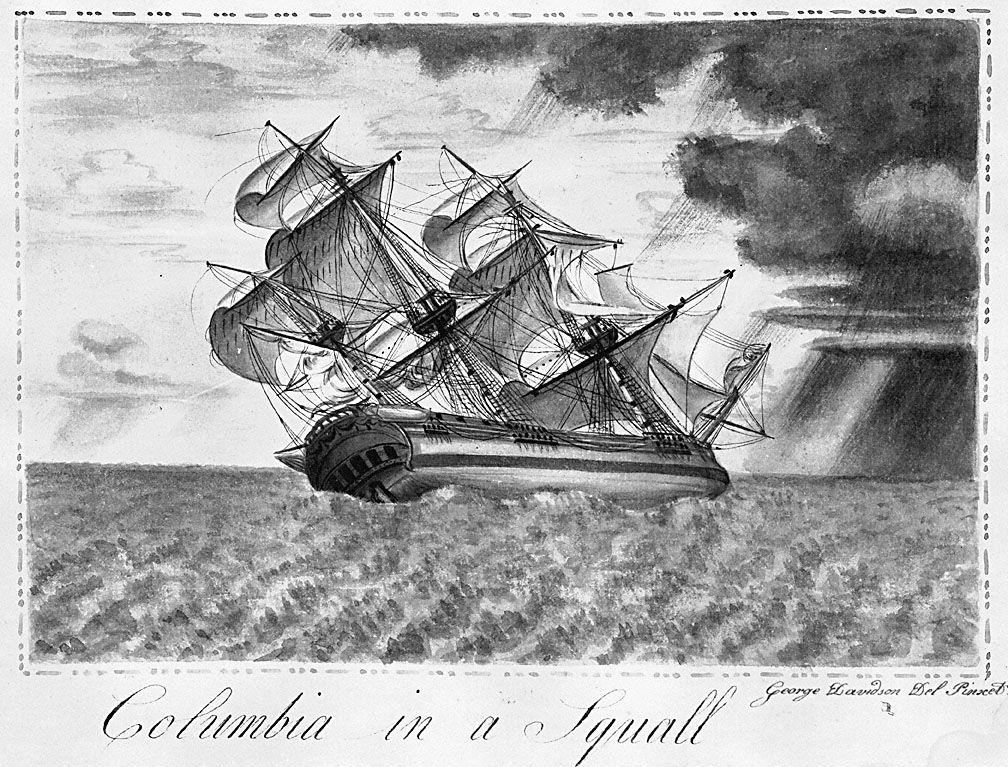
- Columbia heeling as she approaches a squall. Drawing by George Davidson in 1793, who served as the ship's artist.

History

United States
- Name: Columbia
- Owner: Joseph Barrell
- Builder: James Briggs
- Laid down: 1773; 1787
- Launched: Norwell, Massachusetts; Plymouth, Massachusetts
- Decommissioned: October 15, 1806
- Renamed: Columbia Rediviva
- Nickname(s): Columbia
- Fate: Salvaged in Boston
- Notes: First US ship to circumnavigate the globe

General characteristics
- Class & type: Full-rigged ship
- Tons burthen: 213 bm
- Length: 83 ft 6 in (25.45 m) on deck.
- Beam: 24 ft 2 in (7.37 m)
- Draught: 11 ft (3.4 m)
- Propulsion: sail
- Sail plan: three-masted ship (foremast, mainmast, mizzenmast)
- Complement: 16-18 minimum and 30-31 maximum
- Armament: 10 cannons, 2 heavy stern chaser guns, 4 heavy and 4 lighter broadside guns.

Columbia Rediviva (commonly known as Columbia) was a privately owned American ship under the command, first, of John Kendrick, and later Captain Robert Gray, best known for being the first American vessel to circumnavigate the globe, and her expedition to the Pacific Northwest for the maritime fur trade. "Rediviva" (Latin "revived") was added to her name upon a rebuilding in 1787. Since Columbia was privately owned, she did not carry the prefix designation "USS".

== History ==
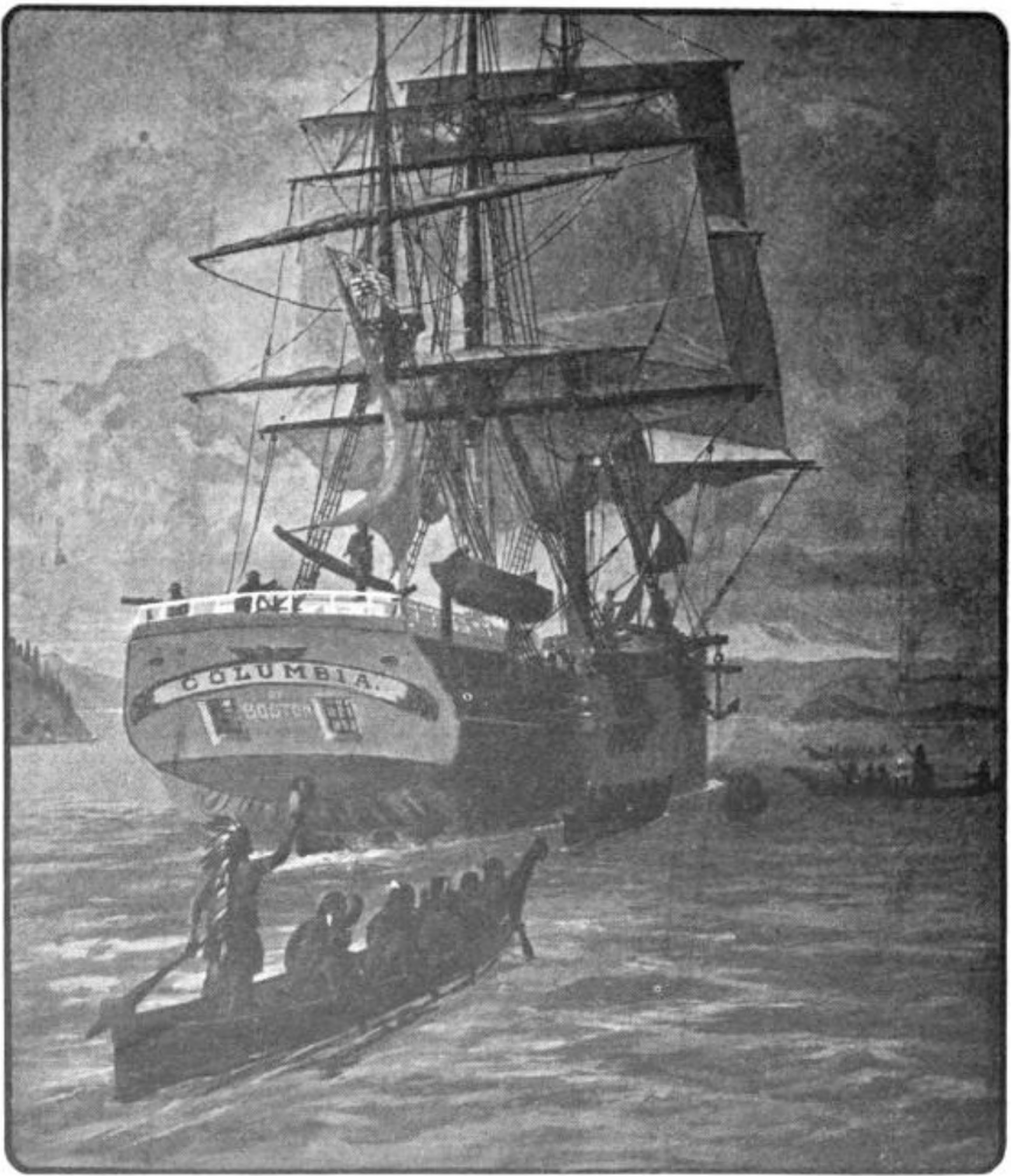
Artist sketch of ship on the Columbia River

Early authorities claim the ship was built in 1773 by James Briggs at Hobart's Landing on North River, in Norwell, Massachusetts and named Columbia. Later historians say she was built in Plymouth, Massachusetts in 1787. In 1790 she became the first American ship to circumnavigate the globe. During the first part of this voyage, she was accompanied by Lady Washington, named for Martha Washington, which served as tender for Columbia. In 1792, Captain Gray entered the Columbia River and named it after the ship. The river and its basin, in turn, lent its name to the surrounding region, and subsequently to the British colony and Canadian province located in part of this region.

The ship was decommissioned and salvaged in 1806. A replica of Lady Washington is homeported at Grays Harbor Historical Seaport in Aberdeen, Washington.

== Officers ==
- Simeon Woodruff, under the command of Kendrick, served as first mate from September to November 1787. A former gunner's mate during the final voyage of Captain James Cook, R.N., was the only man in the entire Columbia Expedition leaving Boston on the first voyage to have been to the Pacific.
- Joseph Ingraham, first mate under the command of Kendrick. In 1790 he was captain of Hope, which competed with Columbia in the fur trade.
- Robert Haswell, first mate under the command of Gray in 1791–93 during the second voyage to the Pacific Northwest.
- John Kendrick Jr, served as an officer under the command of his father, John Kendrick, during the first voyage. In 1789 at Nootka Sound left to join the Spanish Navy.
- John Boit was fifth officer of Columbia on its second voyage from 1790 to 1793; he was fifteen years old on the day of its departure. His log of the expedition is the only complete account of the second voyage of Columbia, and only one of two written accounts of the first European Americans to locate what they would call the Columbia River on May 12, 1792.

== Legacy ==
- In 1958, a full-scale replica of the ship opened as an attraction, named "Sailing Ship Columbia", in Frontierland at Disneyland, and the three-masted vessel continues to ply the Rivers of America there most days of the year. Contained within the hull is "Below Decks", which is an exhibit of nautical artifacts from the 18th Century that passengers can visit while on board. The ship was designed by Walt Disney Imagineering with direction from Admiral Joe Fowler and marine expert Ray Wallace.
- In July 1969, the name was used for the Apollo 11 Command Module Columbia, the mission which landed humans on the Moon for the first time.
- In 1981, the name was re-used for the Space Shuttle Columbia by NASA.
