= Epper Passage Provincial Park =

Provincial park in British Columbia, Canada

- IUCN category III (natural monument or feature)
- Location within British Columbia
- Interactive map of Epper Passage Provincial Park
- Location: Alberni-Clayoquot RD, British Columbia
- Nearest city: Tofino
- Coordinates: 49°13′10″N 125°57′00″W
- Area: 306 ha (760 acres)
- Created: 12 July 1995
- Governing body: BC Parks

Epper Passage Provincial Park is a provincial park in British Columbia, Canada, located on the north side of Vargas Island in the Clayoquot Sound region of the West Coast of Vancouver Island. Also on Vargas Island is Vargas Island Provincial Park. Other provincial parks nearby are Flores Island Marine Provincial Park, Gibson Marine Provincial Park, Maquinna Marine Provincial Park, Sydney Inlet Provincial Park, Dawley Passage Provincial Park and Hesquiat Peninsula Provincial Park. The park was created as part of the Clayoquot Land-Use Decision on July 13, 1995, and contains approximately 306 ha (760 acres).

== See also ==
- Pacific Rim National Park
