= Dawley Passage Provincial Park =

Provincial park on Vancouver Island in British Columbia, Canada

- IUCN category II (national park)
- Location within British Columbia
- Interactive map of Dawley Passage Provincial Park
- Location: Alberni-Clayoquot RD, British Columbia
- Nearest city: Tofino
- Coordinates: 49°08′50″N 125°47′10″W
- Area: 154 ha (380 acres)
- Created: 12 July 1995
- Governing body: BC Parks

Dawley Passage Provincial Park is a provincial park in British Columbia, Canada, located at the south end of Fortune Channel, which lies between Meares Island and the mainland of Vancouver Island just south. The park is to the north of the resort town of Tofino and is accessible by boat only. It was created on July 13, 1995 as part of the Clayoquot Land-Use Decision and contains 154 ha (380 acres), (61.6 ha (152 acres) of upland and 92.5 ha (229 acres) of foreshore).

The park's name comes from Dawley Passage which is a tidal narrows with strong currents and abundant marine life, which makes it popular for scuba diving. Dawley Passage was named for Walter P. Dawley, a trader from Victoria who salvaged lumber from shipwrecks and at one time operated a store and hotel at Clayoquot and eventually owned stores at Ahousat, Nootka and Neuchatlitz Inlet.

== See also ==
- Epper Passage Provincial Park
- Flores Island Marine Provincial Park
- Gibson Marine Provincial Park
- Vargas Island Provincial Park
