= Kiišḥniqʷus Conservancy =

Conservancy in British Columbia, Canada

- Location within British Columbia
- Interactive map of Kiišḥniqʷus Conservancy
- Location: Alberni-Clayoquot, British Columbia, Canada
- Nearest town: Tofino
- Coordinates: 49°28′30″N 126°13′00″W
- Area: 11,012 ha (42.52 sq mi)
- Designation: Conservancy
- Established: 2024
- Governing body: BC Parks

The Kiišḥniqʷus Conservancy is a conservancy in British Columbia, Canada. Established on June 18, 2024, the conservancy covers 11,012 hectares of land. It covers part of the Sydney River valley and most of the area between the Sydney Inlet and the Shelter Inlet. It borders the Sydney Inlet Provincial Park to its west, the Strathcona Provincial Park to its east and the Sulphur Passage Provincial Park to its southeast.

Its name Kiišḥniqʷus (pronounced Keesh-ha-neh-kwus in English) is the Nuu-chah-nulth name of an Ahousaht fishing camp at the mouth of the Sydney River and is also used to refer to the mouth of that river.
