= Hot Springs Cove =

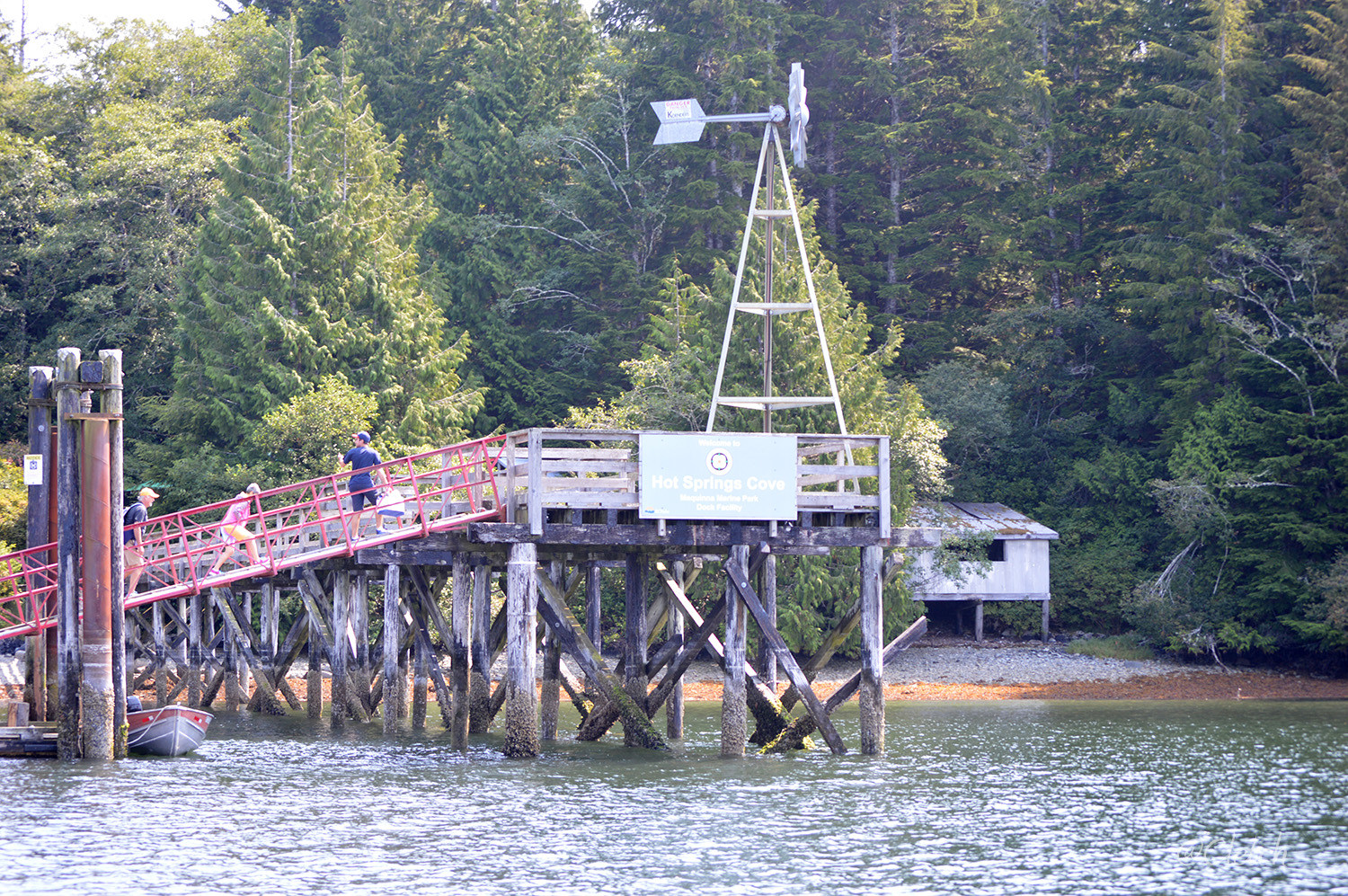
- Dock at Hot Springs Cove

- Location of Hot Springs Cove in British Columbia
- Coordinates: 49°22′00″N 126°15′45″W
- Country: Canada
- Province: British Columbia
- Time zone: UTC−07:00 (Pacific Time)
- Area codes: 250, 778

Hot Springs Cove, formerly Refuge Cove, is an unincorporated settlement on Sydney Inlet on West Coast of Vancouver Island. It is located on the west side of the Openit Peninsula in the western Clayoquot Sound region. Hot Springs Cove derives its name from its proximity to Ramsay Hot Springs, and is protected by Maquinna Marine Provincial Park. The post office at Hot Springs Cove was closed in 1974 but had operated since 1947, when it was first named Sydney Inlet until being renamed in 1948. Despite the closure of the post office, there remains a year-round population in the vicinity.

== See also ==
- Sydney Inlet Provincial Park
- Gibson Marine Provincial Park
- Hesquiat Peninsula Provincial Park
- Sulphur Passage Provincial Park
- Marktosis, British Columbia
