= Walk On =

Walk On may refer to:

== Music ==
=== Albums ===
- Walk On (Boston album) or the title song, 1994
- Walk On (John Hiatt album) or the title song, 1995
- Walk On (Randy Johnston album) or the title song, 1992
- Walk On, by Kellie Coffey, 2007
- Walk On, by Maren Morris, 2005

=== Songs ===
- "Walk On" (Reba McEntire song), 1990
- "Walk On" (U2 song), 2001
- "Baby, Walk On", by Matraca Berg, 1990; covered by Linda Ronstadt as "Walk On", 1995
- "Walk On", by Corinne Bailey Rae from The Heart Speaks in Whispers, 2016
- "Walk On", by Deep Purple from Bananas, 2003
- "Walk On", by Hilltop Hoods from The Calling, 2003
- "Walk On", by Jimmy Barnes from Freight Train Heart, 1987
- "Walk On", by Neil Young from On the Beach, 1974
- "Walk On", by Roy Orbison from Roy Orbison's Many Moods, 1969

== Other uses ==
- Walk-on (sports), an athlete who becomes part of a team without being actively recruited
- Walk-on (actor), a performer in a small role with no dialogue

== See also ==
- Walk On By (disambiguation)
- Walk on Water (disambiguation)
- Walk on the Wild Side (disambiguation)
