= Clayoquot Sound Biosphere Reserve =

UNESCO Biosphere Reserve in British Columbia, Canada

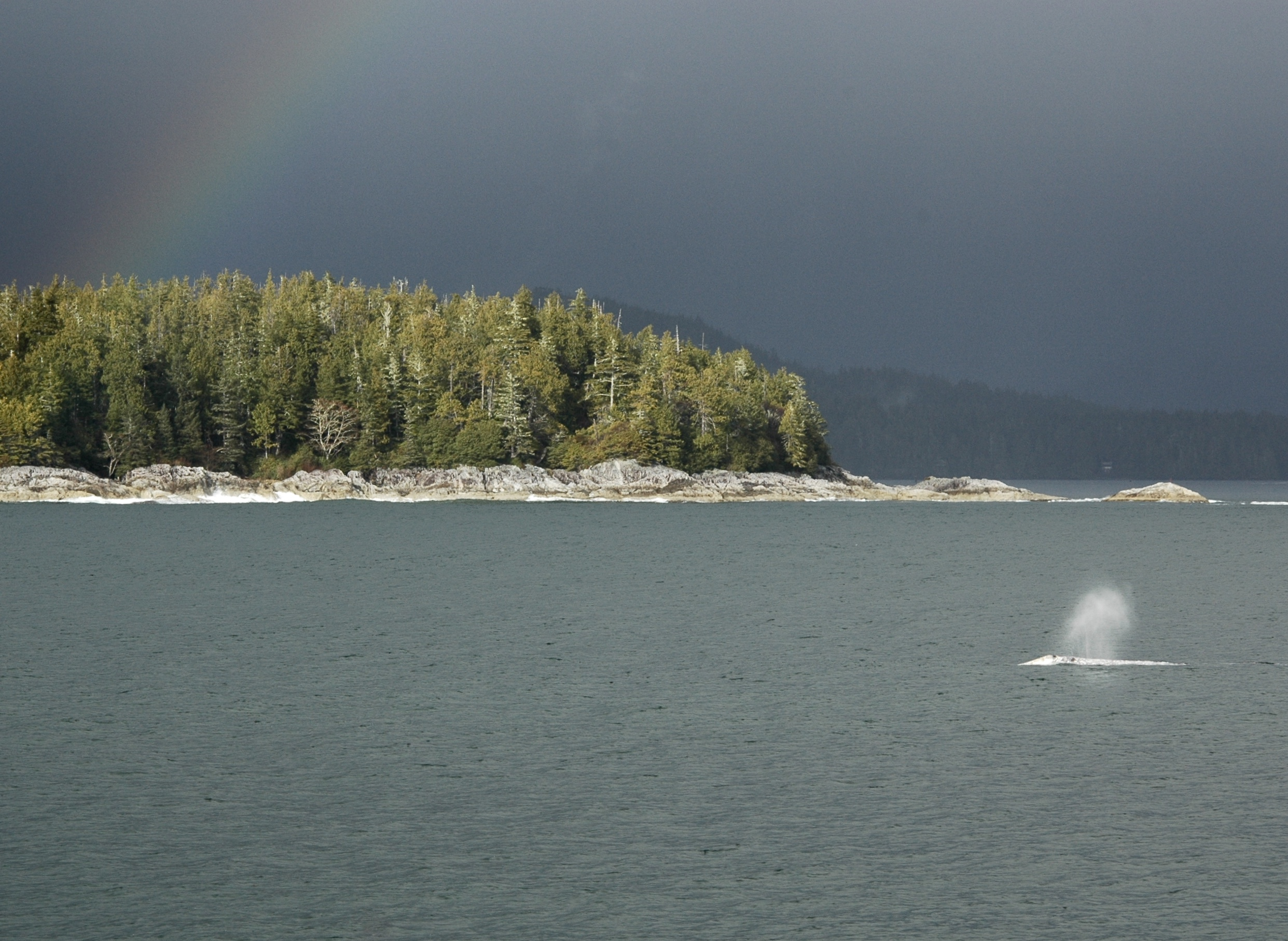
- A gray whale in Clayoquot Sound

- Location within British Columbia Location within Canada
- Location: Clayoquot Sound, British Columbia, Canada
- Nearest city: Tofino
- Coordinates: 49°18′N 125°56′W
- Area: 349,947 ha (1,351.15 sq mi)
- Established: 2000
- Administrator: Clayoquot Biosphere Trust Society
- World Heritage site: UNESCO Clayoquot Sound

Clayoquot Sound Biosphere Reserve is a UNESCO Biosphere Reserve situated in Clayoquot Sound on the west coast of Vancouver Island in British Columbia, Canada. A diverse range of ecosystems exist within the biosphere reserve boundaries, including temperate coastal rainforest, ocean and rocky coastal shores.

Nine of the large forested valleys remain untouched by logging or other industrial development. The area's temperate rainforest, lakes, rivers and alpine peaks provide habitats for a vast array of species, a significant number of which are endangered or rare. Given that development is increasingly resulting in the fragmentation of forest and alpine ecosystems and loss of biodiversity in coastal rainforests, this biosphere reserve provides a refuge and centre for the natural dispersion and re-establishment of species.

== Ecological characteristics ==
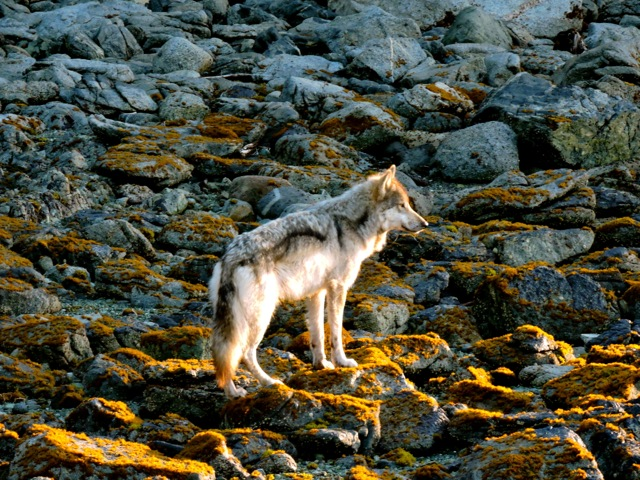
Vancouver Island wolf, a rare subspecies of gray wolf native to Vancouver Island

The primary habitat of the Clayoquot Biosphere is temperate rainforest (Coastal Western Hemlock), covering 85% of the terrestrial component and extending to altitudes of about 900 m. The habitat is dominated by large trees including the Western Hemlock, Western Red Cedar, Amabilis Fir, Western Yellow Cedar, Sitka Spruce, Pine, Douglas Fir, Yew and Red Alder. There are approximately 300 vertebrate species, including the American black bear (Ursus americanus), cougar (Puma concolor couguar), American mink (Neovison vison) and grey wolf (Canis lupus).

The second common habitat covering 12% of the Clayoquot Sound above 900 m is temperate rainforest (Mountain Hemlock). Dominant trees include the Mountain Hemlock, Western Yellow Cedar and Amabilis Fir. Fewer species are found at such a high altitude, but include some those of those found at lower altitudes.

The marine component of the Clayoquot supports mud flats, beaches and estuaries. The reserve contains the largest cover of eelgrass on the west coast of Vancouver Island. Cetaceans such as humpback whales (Megaptera novaeangliae), gray whales (Eschrichtius robustus), orcas (Orcinus orca), and a variety of other whale, dolphin and porpoise species are common. Steller's (Eumetopias jubatus) and California sea lions (Zalophus californianus) are also found in the reserve. Commercial aquaculture of native salmon species and introduced Atlantic salmon, oysters and scallops constitute significant economic activities.

== Socio-economic characteristics ==
The permanent population amounts to about 5,000 people. At least one-third are Nuu-chah-nulth First Nations (of Aboriginal ancestry), whose traditional territories encompass the entire biosphere reserve. Since 2000, the local economy has shifted from being based on industrial forestry and fisheries towards a more ecologically sensitive approach informed by Nuu-chah-nulth cultural principles. The First Nations and provincial government are working together to develop small-scale alternatives built around a conservation economy. Aquaculture is well established.

Because of the nature of the resources, tourism and related services have been encouraged. They are developing rapidly along the coast, both in and between two towns accessible from the only road into the biosphere reserve. Seasonal visitors amount to about 1 million annually.

== Protected areas ==
Protected areas located within the biosphere reserve include:

- Clayoquot Arm Provincial Park
- Clayoquot Plateau Provincial Park
- Cleland Island Ecological Reserve
- Dawley Passage Provincial Park
- Epper Passage Provincial Park
- Flores Island Marine Provincial Park
- Gibson Marine Provincial Park
- Hesquiat Lake Provincial Park
- Hesquiat Peninsula Provincial Park
- Kennedy Lake Provincial Park
- Kennedy River Bog Provincial Park
- Maquinna Marine Provincial Park
- Megin River Ecological Reserve
- Pacific Rim National Park Reserve (partially)
- Strathcona Provincial Park (partially)
- Sulphur Passage Provincial Park
- Sydney Inlet Provincial Park
- Tranquil Creek Provincial Park
- Vargas Island Provincial Park
- Wah-nuh-jus—Hilthoois Tribal Park

== See also ==
- Mount Arrowsmith Biosphere Region
- List of UNESCO Biosphere Reserves in Canada
