= ʔuuʔinmitis Conservancy =

Conservancy in British Columbia, Canada

- Location within British Columbia
- Interactive map of ʔuuʔinmitis Conservancy
- Location: Alberni-Clayoquot, British Columbia, Canada
- Nearest town: Tofino
- Coordinates: 49°20′20″N 125°42′30″W
- Area: 22,880 ha (88.3 sq mi)
- Designation: Conservancy
- Established: 2024
- Governing body: BC Parks

The ʔuuʔinmitis Conservancy (oo-in-MIT-is) is a conservancy in British Columbia, Canada. Established on June 18, 2024, the conservancy covers 22,880 hectares of land. It covers the area north and east of the Bedwell Sound. It borders the Strathcona Provincial Park to its north and the Unaacuł-Ḥiłsyakƛis Conservancy and the Tranquil Creek Provincial Park to its southeast.

Its Nuu-chah-nulth name ʔuuʔinmitis (pronounced Oo-in-mit-is in English), also written ḥuuʔinmitis, is used for a village site on the east of the Bedwell River referring to both Bedwell River and Ursus Creek. The ʔuuʔinmitisʔatḥ (O-inmitisaht), now amalgamated with the ʔaaḥhuusatḥ (Ahousaht), get their name from it.
