= Č̓icy̓i Conservancy =

Conservancy in British Columbia, Canada

- Location within British Columbia
- Interactive map of Č̓icy̓i Conservancy
- Location: Alberni-Clayoquot, British Columbia, Canada
- Nearest town: Tofino
- Coordinates: 49°19′30″N 126°08′00″W
- Area: 9,269 ha (35.79 sq mi)
- Designation: Conservancy
- Established: 2024
- Governing body: BC Parks

The Č̓icy̓i Conservancy is a conservancy in British Columbia, Canada. Established on June 18, 2024, the conservancy covers 9,269 hectares of land. It covers the central and eastern part of Flores Island and part of its northwest.

Its name Č̓icy̓i (pronounced Chits-yee in English) is Nuu-chah-nulth Ahousaht name of the Rafael Point on the southwest side of Flores Island and of Mount Flores northeast from Rafael Point.
