= Unaacuł-Ḥiłsyakƛis Conservancy =

Conservancy in British Columbia, Canada

- Location within British Columbia
- Interactive map of Unaacuł-Ḥiłsyakƛis Conservancy
- Location: Alberni-Clayoquot, British Columbia, Canada
- Nearest town: Tofino
- Coordinates: 49°12′44″N 125°38′34″W
- Area: 12,104 ha (46.73 sq mi)
- Designation: Conservancy
- Established: 2024
- Governing body: BC Parks

The Unaacuł-Ḥiłsyakƛis Conservancy is a conservancy in British Columbia, Canada. Established on June 18, 2024, the conservancy covers 12,104 hectares of land. It covers parts of the coast of the Tofino Inlet. It borders the Tranquil Creek Provincial Park and the ʔuuʔinmitis Conservancy to its northwest, the Clayoquot Arm Provincial Park and the ʔaʔukmin Conservancy to its east.

Its name Unaacuł-Ḥiłsyakƛis is composed of two Nuu-chah-nulth Tla-o-qui-aht place names: Unaacuł (also written ʔunaac̓uł) for the mouth of Tofino Creek (also called Deer Creek) which is also used for the Onadsilth Indian Reserve #9, Ḥiłsyakƛis (also written hiłsyaqƛis) for the Tranquil River or its mouth at the head of Tranquil Inlet which is also used for the Eelsuklis Indian Reserve #10.
