= ʔaʔukmin Conservancy =

Conservancy in British Columbia, Canada

- Location within British Columbia
- Interactive map of ʔaʔukmin Conservancy
- Location: Alberni-Clayoquot, British Columbia, Canada
- Nearest town: Tofino
- Coordinates: 49°10′00″N 125°31′00″W
- Area: 11,267 ha (43.50 sq mi)
- Designation: Conservancy
- Established: 2024
- Governing body: BC Parks

The ʔaʔukmin Conservancy (ah-OOK-meen) is a conservancy in British Columbia, Canada. Established on June 18, 2024, the conservancy covers 11,267 hectares of land. It covers most of the area between the two arms of Kennedy Lake as well as the area between Clayoquot Arm Provincial Park and Clayoquot Plateau Provincial Park. It also borders the Unaacuł-Ḥiłsyakƛis Conservancy to its northwest.

Its name ʔaʔukmin (also written haʔukmin) is the Nuu-chah-nulth Tla-o-qui-aht names for Kennedy Lake and means "feasting bowl".

== See also ==
=== External links ===
- ʔaʔukmin (Kennedy Flats Watershed), Redd Fish Restoration
