= Kʷuḥaa Conservancy =

Conservancy in British Columbia, Canada

- Location within British Columbia
- Interactive map of Kʷuḥaa Conservancy
- Location: Alberni-Clayoquot, British Columbia, Canada
- Nearest town: Tofino
- Coordinates: 49°25′30″N 126°17′30″W
- Area: 1,916 ha (7.40 sq mi)
- Designation: Conservancy
- Established: 2024
- Governing body: BC Parks

The Kʷuḥaa Conservancy is a conservancy in British Columbia, Canada. Established on June 18, 2024, the conservancy covers 1,916 hectares of land. It is covers most of the coast of the Stewardson Inlet and part of the Sydney Inlet, south of the Sydney Inlet Provincial Park.

Its name Kʷuḥaa (pronounced Kwew-haa in English) is the Nuu-chah-nulth name of the head of the Stewardson Inlet.
