= Wildside (hiking trail) =

Hiking trail on Flores Island, British Columbia, Canada

Coordinates: 49.2599°N 126.0748°W

Ahousaht Wildside Heritage Trail
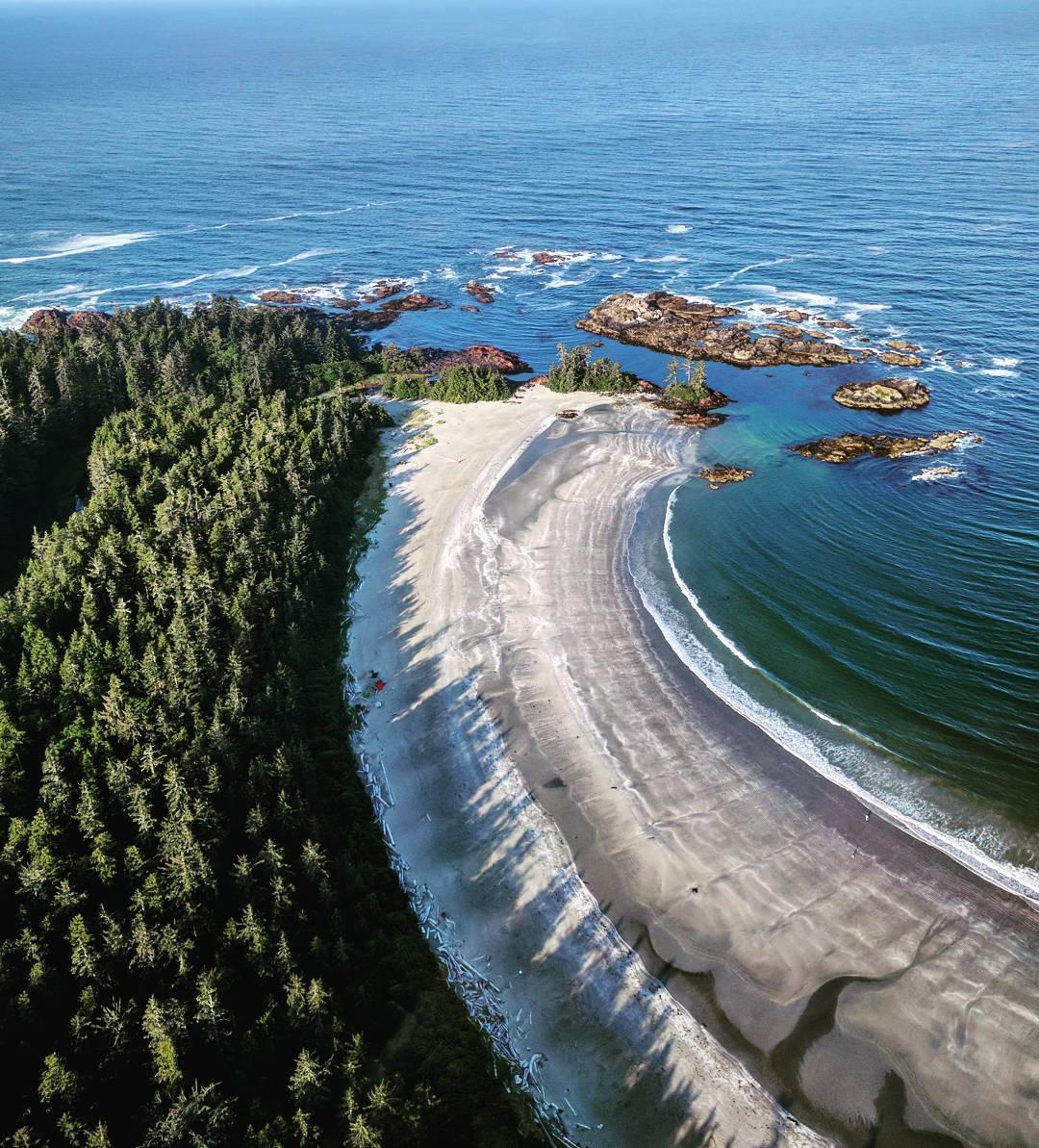
- Cow Bay Beach views from a seaplane
- Length: 11 km (6.8 mi)
- Location: Flores Island, British Columbia, Canada
- Established: 1993
- Trailheads: Marktosis (south) to Cow Bay (north)
- Use: Hiking
- Maintainer: Ahousaht First Nation

The Ahousaht Wildside Heritage Trail is a hiking trail on Flores Island, British Columbia, Canada in Ahousaht Traditional Territories that connects the town of Ahousat, the village of Marktosis, to several beaches and wild forest and is 11 km (6.8 mi) long one way ending in Cow Bay. The trail features signage at locations important to the Ahousat people; further information about each location of importance is shared in a guidebook published by Elder Stanley Sam.

The trail began as a First Nations women's ecotourism initiative to secure steady jobs and income for the people of the Ahousaht First Nation and was created by manual labour in 1993. The trail office was re-opened in 2010 as a non-profit operation dedicated to job creation within the Ahousat community, as well as ongoing stewardship by Ahousat of lands used by their people for thousands of years.
