= Sup̓itsaqtuʔis Conservancy =

Conservancy in British Columbia, Canada

- Location within British Columbia
- Interactive map of Sup̓itsaqtuʔis Conservancy
- Location: Alberni-Clayoquot, British Columbia, Canada
- Nearest town: Tofino
- Coordinates: 49°11′40″N 125°58′20″W
- Area: 1,272 ha (4.91 sq mi)
- Designation: Conservancy
- Established: 2024
- Governing body: BC Parks

The Sup̓itsaqtuʔis Conservancy is a conservancy in British Columbia, Canada. Established on June 26, 2024, the conservancy covers 1,272 hectares of land. It covers the northeastern part of Vargas Island.

Its name Sup̓itsaqtuʔis (pronounced Suh-pits-aak-two-is in English) refers to, in Nuu-chah-nulth, the historical boundary between Kiltsmaʔatḥ (Kelstmaht) and ʔaaḥuusʔatḥ (Ahousaht) on Vargas Island.
