= Wildside =

Wildside or Wild Side may refer to:

== Film and television ==
- Wild Side, a defunct Japanese adult video studio founded by Kaoru Toyoda
- Wild Side (1995 film), an American film by Donald Cammell
- Wild Side (2004 film), a French/Belgian/British film by Sébastien Lifshitz
- Wild Side Show, a 1992 children's nature series, shortened to Wild Side for its second season
- Wildside, a Fremantle film production company in Italy
- Wildside (American TV series), a 1985 Western series
- Wildside (Australian TV series), a 1997–1999 police drama

== Literature ==
- Wildside (comics), a Marvel Comics villain
- Wildside Press, an American independent publishing company
- Wildside, a 1996 science fiction novel by Steven Gould

== Music ==
- Wildside (album), by Loverboy, and the title song, 1987
- Wildside Records, a New Zealand record label
- Wildside (band), a 1990s American metal band; see Dito Godwin

=== Songs ===
- "Wildside" (Marky Mark and the Funky Bunch song), 1991
- "Wild Side" (Normani song), 2021
- "Wild Side", by ALI, opening song for the anime Beastars, 2019
- "Wildside", by Billy Idol from Dream Into It, 2025
- "Wild Side", by Brian Justin Crum, 2017
- "Wild Side", by Chilldrin of da Ghetto from Chilldrin of da Ghetto, 1999
- "Wild Side", by Ezio from Live:Cambridge, 2004
- "Wild Side", by La Toya Jackson from No Relations, 1991
- "Wild Side", by Mötley Crüe from Girls, Girls, Girls, 1987
- "Wildside", by Keith Urban from High, 2024
- "Wildside", by Red Velvet from Bloom, 2022
- "Wildside", by Sabrina Carpenter and Sofia Carson, 2016

== Other uses ==
- Wildside (hiking trail), a hiking trail on Flores Island, British Columbia, Canada
- Wildside, the student section for the Northwestern Wildcats men's basketball team

== See also ==
- Wild Side Story, a 1973 parody stage musical
- Wild Side West, a lesbian bar in San Francisco, California, US
- Wildsiderz, a comic-book series by J. Scott Campbell and Andy Hartnell
- Walk on the Wild Side (disambiguation)
