= Kingfisher (sloop) =

History

United Kingdom
- Name: Kingfisher
- Captured: By the Nuu-chah-nulth people, Ahousaht, 1864

General characteristics
- Class & type: Sloop

Kingfisher was a sloop engaged in merchant trading out of Victoria, British Columbia, Canada to First Nations peoples around Vancouver Island and adjoining waters. During trading with the Ahousaht Nation, a part of the Nuu-chah-nulth in Clayoquot Sound late in 1864 the vessel was attacked and its captain, a Captain Stephenson, and three crew members were massacred. HMS Devastation, a small gunboat, was dispatched to the scene but due to overwhelming superiority of Ahousaht forces waited for reinforcements, which came in the form of the screw frigate HMS Sutlej and its fifty guns. Holding offshore from Marktosis, one of the main Ahousaht communities, Admiral Denman, commander of the vessel, demanded the surrender of Chapchah, who had masterminded the killings. When the residents refused, Denman opened fire on the village, destroying it. Subsequently, the village of Moyat and others were destroyed by shellfire and incendiary rockets from Sutlej.

== See also ==
- List of ships in British Columbia
