= HMS Sutlej (1855) =

Frigate of the Royal Navy

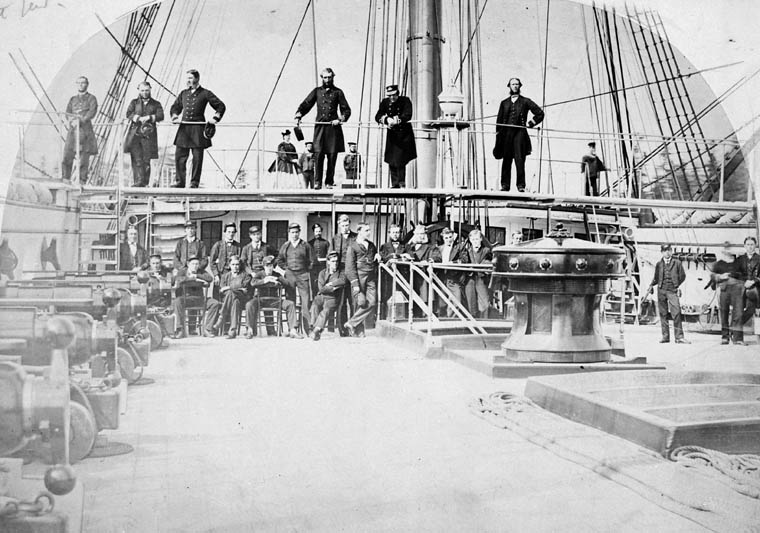
- Sutlej's officers in the late 1860s while flagship Pacific. Photography by Frederick Dally.

History

United Kingdom
- Name: HMS Sutlej
- Ordered: 26 March 1845
- Builder: Pembroke Dockyard
- Laid down: August 1847
- Launched: 17 April 1855
- Fate: Broken up in 1869

General characteristics
- Class & type: 50-gun Constance-class fourth-rate frigate
- Tons burthen: 2,066 tons; 3,066 tons after 1860
- Length: 180 ft (55 m)
- Beam: 51 ft (16 m)
- Draught: 16 ft 3 in (4.95 m)
- Propulsion: Sails; screw assisted after 1860
- Complement: 500
- Armament: 50 guns; Upper deck; 28 × 32-pounder guns (later 10 × 8-inch guns and 18 × 32-pounder guns); Quarter deck; 14 × 32-pounder guns (later 10 × 8-inch guns and 4 × 32-pounder guns); Forecastle; 8 × 32-pounder guns; 10 × 8-inch guns

HMS Sutlej was a Constance-class 50-gun fourth-rate frigate of the Royal Navy.

== History ==
The class was designed by Sir William Symonds in 1843, and were the largest sailing frigates built for the Navy. Sutlej was ordered from Pembroke Dockyard on 26 March 1845, laid down in August 1847 and launched on 17 April 1855. She was then laid up in ordinary at Portsmouth, before being converted to a screw frigate between 1859 and 1860. She was undocked on 26 March 1860. She had a brief career as an active navy ship.

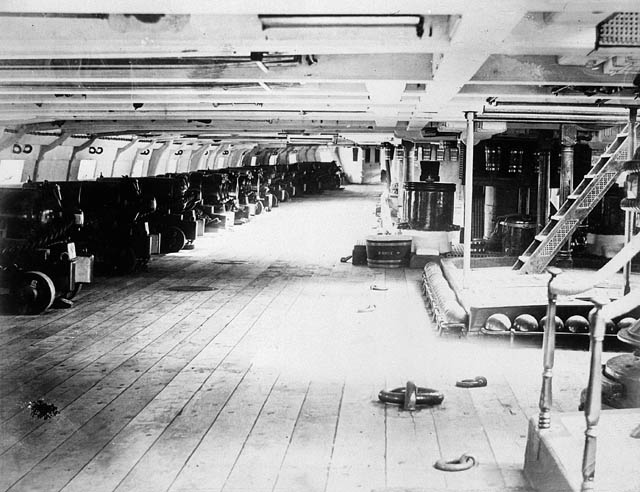
Gun deck on HMS Sutlej, circa. 1865-1868

The name Sutlej was chosen to commemorate the victory of East India Company forces over the Sikh Khalsa Army, in the Battle of Sobraon on the banks of the Sutlej. She was commanded from her commissioning by Captain Matthew Connolly, spending time with the Pacific Station, based at Esquimalt, in 1864 as the flagship of Rear-Admiral John Kingcome. She was commanded by Captain Trevenen Penrose Coode from 1867, and was the flagship of Rear-Admiral Joseph Denman. She then returned to Britain for paying off. Sutlej was broken up at Portsmouth in 1869.

== Notable incidents ==
On 1 October 1863, Sutlej provoked a minor incident when she entered San Francisco on a windless day, with her ensign indiscernible due to the lack of a breeze. When Sutlej failed to halt in response to a cannon signal, the commander of the federal fort at Alcatraz ordered a shot to be placed across her bow. The incident ended when Sutlej halted and fired a 21-gun salute.

In October 1864, the Sutlej participated in a raid of nine Ahousaht villages. The Ahousaht nation suffered 15 casualties and 11 prisoners taken, including the wife and child of Chief Cap-chah.

In 1865, when Sutlej again docked at San Francisco, one-third of her crew took the opportunity to desert.

== See also ==
- Chilcotin War
- Kingfisher (sloop)

== Bibliography ==
- Colledge, J. J.; Warlow, Ben (2006) [1969]. Ships of the Royal Navy: The Complete Record of All Fighting Ships of the Royal Navy from the 15th Century to the Present (3rd Rev ed.). London: Chatham Publishing. ISBN 978-1-86176-281-8. OCLC 67375475.
- Lyon, David and Winfield, Rif, The Sail and Steam Navy List, All the Ships of the Royal Navy 1815-1889, pub Chatham, 2004, ISBN 1-86176-032-9
