= Gibson Marine Provincial Park =

Park on Flores Island, Canada

- IUCN category II (national park)
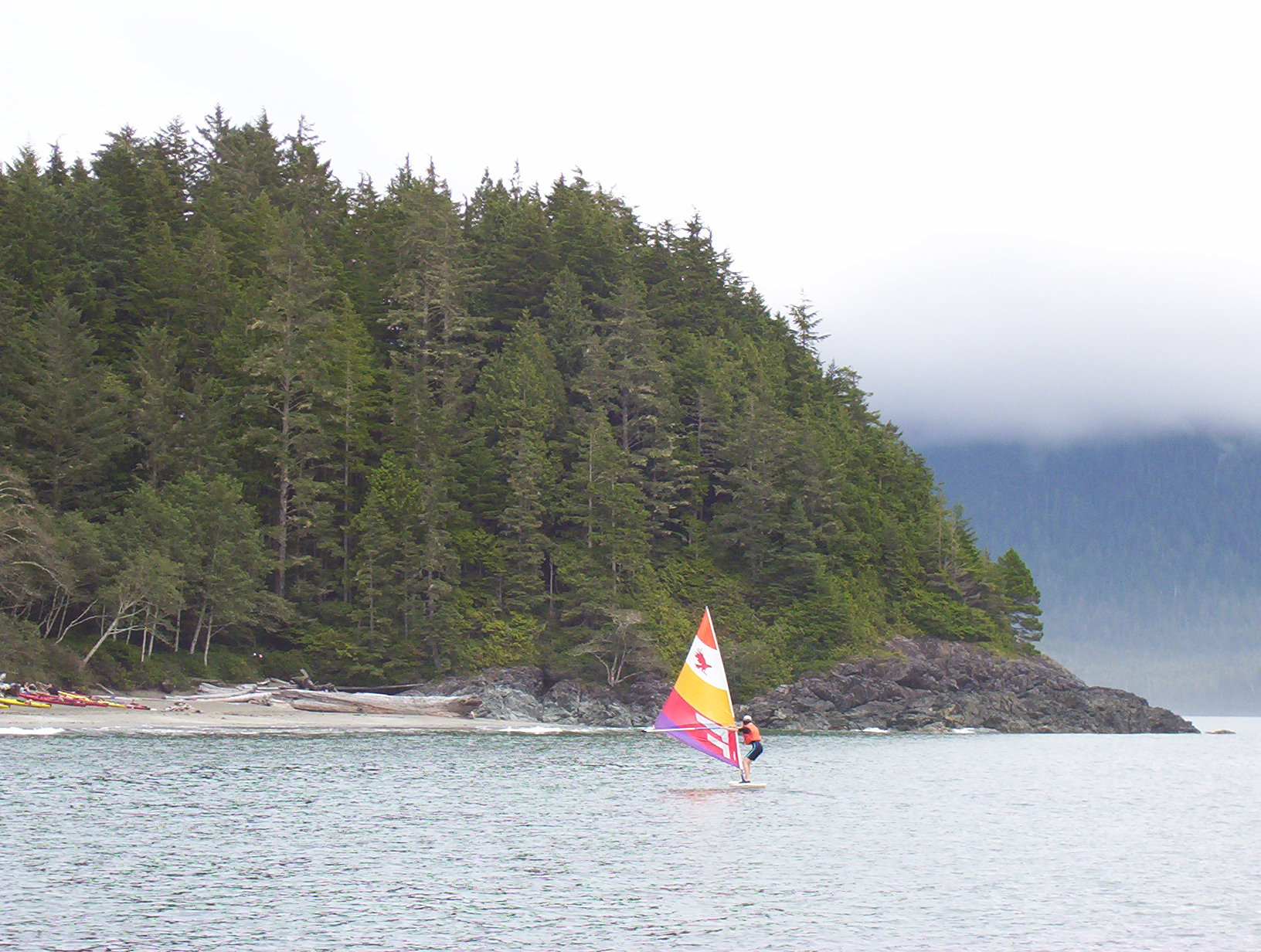

- Location within British Columbia
- Interactive map of Gibson Marine Provincial Park
- Location: British Columbia, Canada
- Coordinates: 49°15′48″N 126°04′25″W
- Area: 143 ha (350 acres)
- Designation: Provincial Park
- Created: 13 November 1967

Gibson Marine Provincial Park is a provincial park in British Columbia, Canada, located on the southeast end of Flores Island in the central Clayoquot Sound region of Vancouver Island. The park was created on 13 November 1967. It contains approximately 143 hectares (350 acres) and is adjacent to Flores Island Provincial Park.

== See also ==
- Hot Springs Cove, British Columbia
- Marktosis, British Columbia
- Maquinna Marine Provincial Park
- Sydney Inlet Provincial Park
- Sulphur Passage Provincial Park
