= Ramsay Hot Springs =

Thermal springs

Coordinates: 49°20′59.75″N 126°15′36.4536″W

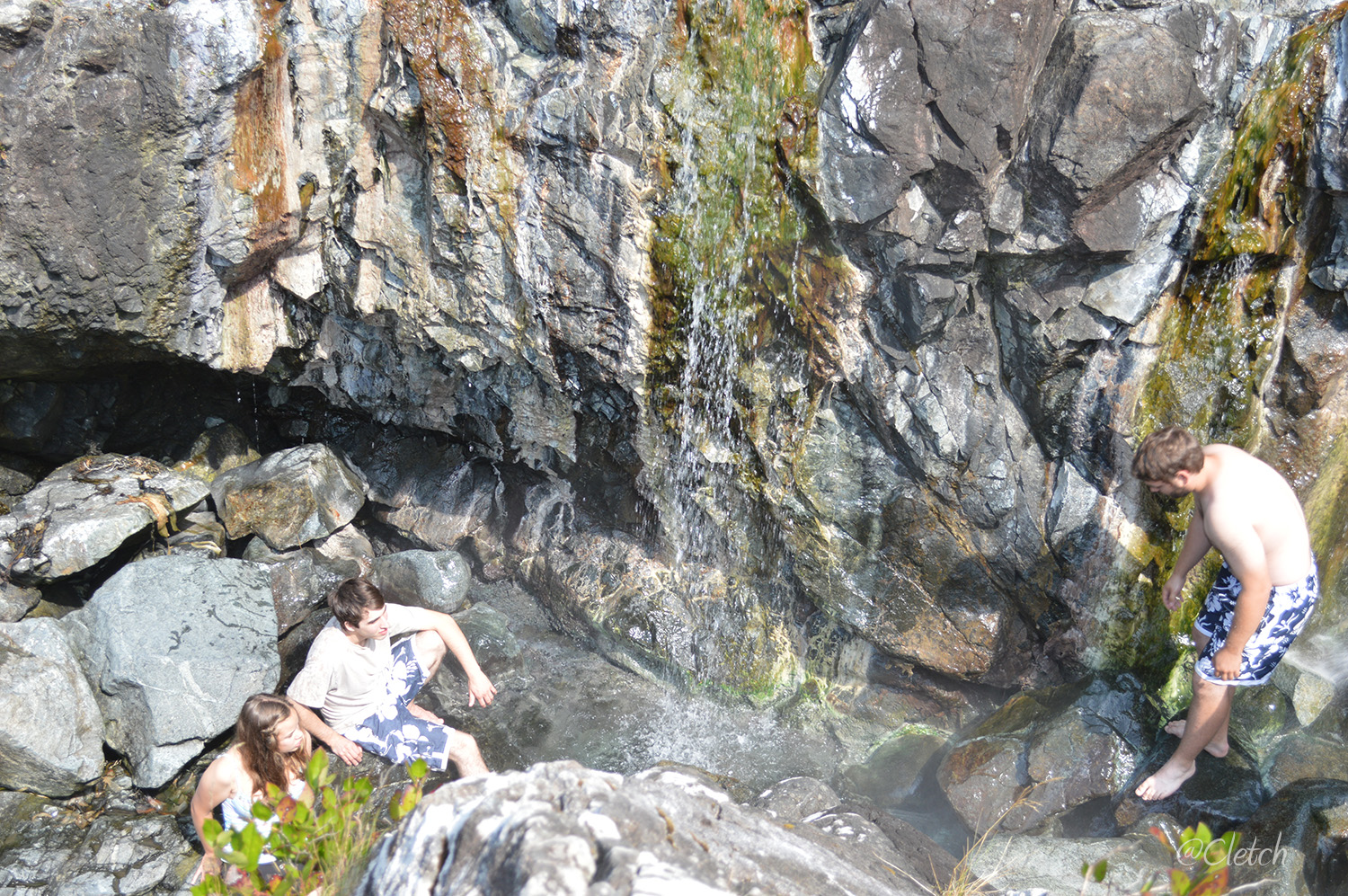
Ramsay Hot Springs

Ramsay Hot Springs, also known as Mux̣šiƛa (Nuu-chah-nulth: "steaming from rock"), is a hot spring in the western Clayoquot Sound region of the West Coast of Vancouver Island, British Columbia, Canada, located north of Sharp Point to the west of Sydney Inlet. The hot springs are the namesake of the community and cove of Hot Springs Cove and are protected by Maquinna Marine Provincial Park. They are accessible only by boat or float plane, and are open year-round.
