= Flores Island =

Flores Island may refer to:

- Flores, an island in Indonesia
- Flores Island (Azores), an island of the Azores archipelago
- Flores Island (British Columbia), laying off the west coast of Vancouver Island in British Columbia, Canada
- Flores Island, Guatemala
- Isla de Flores in Uruguay
