= List of historic places in the Alberni-Clayoquot Regional District =

The following list includes all of the Canadian Register of Historic Places listings in Alberni-Clayoquot Regional District, British Columbia.

Name	Address	Coordinates	Government recognition (CRHP №)	Wikidata ID	Image
Lighttower	Estevan Point; Alberni-Clayoquot B BC	49°22′59″N 126°32′39″W	Federal (2929, (20372)		
Lighttower	Pachena Point; Alberni-Clayoquot C BC	48°43′20″N 125°05′51″W	Federal (4750)		
Cape Beale Lighthouse	Cape Beale; Alberni-Clayoquot BC	48°47′11″N 125°12′56″W	Federal (20777)		
Kiix?in Village and Fortress National Historic Site of Canada	Barkley Sound BC	48°48′24″N 125°10′44″W	Federal (16368)		Upload Photo
Alberni Post Office	4888 Johnston Road; Port Alberni BC	49°15′30″N 124°48′36″W	Port Alberni municipality (18182)		Upload Photo
Carmoor Block	3074 Kingsway Avenue; Port Alberni BC	49°14′04″N 124°48′43″W	Port Alberni municipality (18425)		Upload Photo
Federal Building	4877 Argyle Street; Port Alberni BC	49°14′06″N 124°48′18″W	Port Alberni municipality (18743)		Upload Photo
McLean Mill National Historic Site of Canada	5633 Smith Road; Port Alberni BC	49°18′39″N 124°49′37″W	Federal (12267)		
Port Alberni City Hall	4850 Argyle Street; Port Alberni BC	49°14′04″N 124°48′18″W	Port Alberni municipality (18427)		Upload Photo
Port Alberni Train Station	3100 Kingsway Avenue; Port Alberni BC	49°14′06″N 124°48′43″W	Port Alberni municipality (18261)		
Rollin Art Centre and Garden	3061 8th Avenue; Port Alberni BC	49°14′03″N 124°48′00″W	Port Alberni municipality (18426)		
Ericsson Shipwreck	In Barkely Sound near Folger Island; Bamfield BC	48°49′51″N 125°14′36″W	British Columbia (19306)		Upload Photo
Lord Western Shipwreck	Sidney Inlet; Hot Springs Cove BC	49°26′10″N 126°13′40″W	British Columbia (19309)		Upload Photo
Hera Shipwreck	Dufferin Passage; Tofino BC	49°09′16″N 125°54′57″W	British Columbia (19308)		Upload Photo
