= Kennedy Lake Provincial Park =

Provincial park in British Columbia, Canada

- IUCN category II (national park)
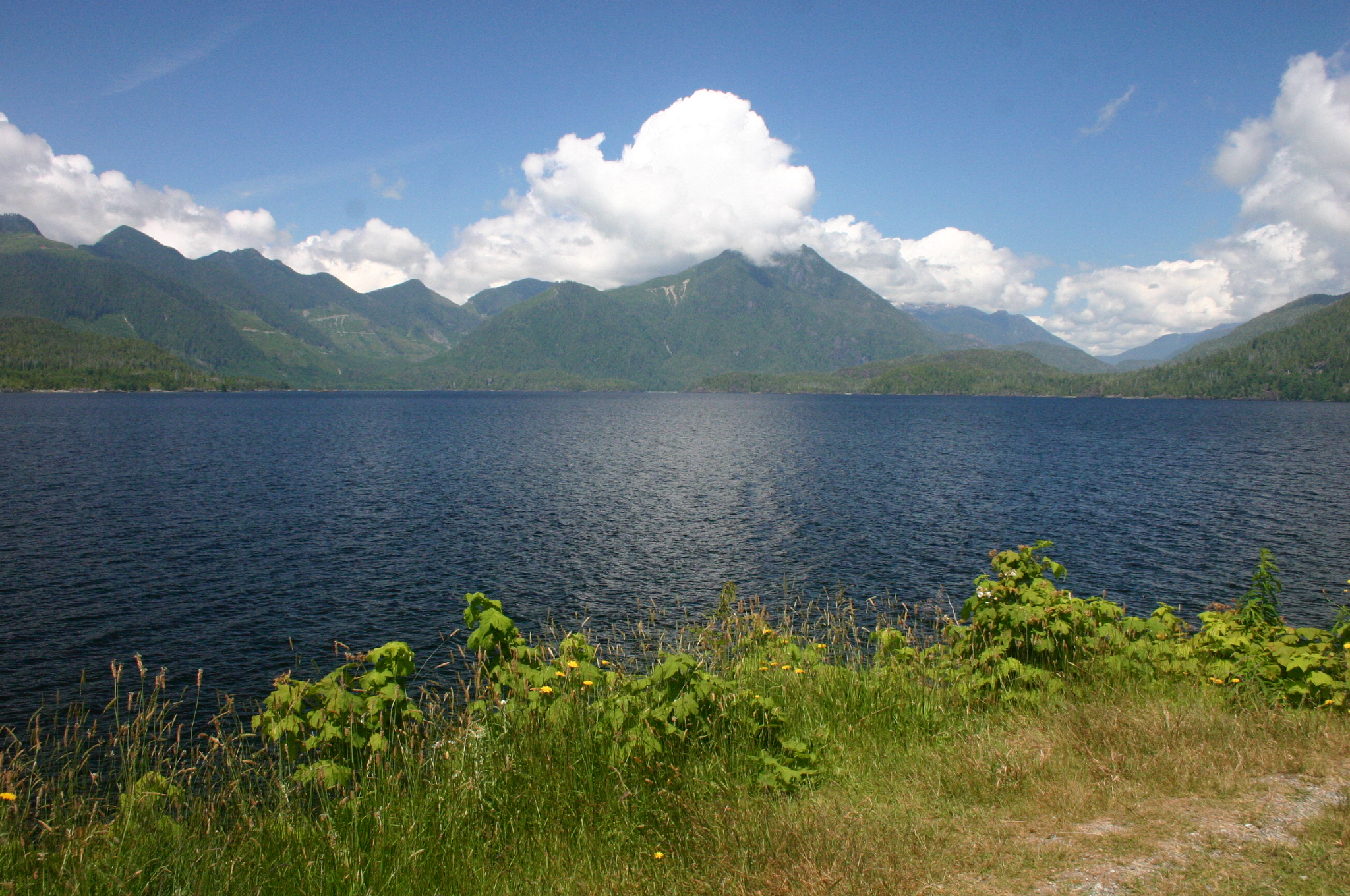

- Location within British Columbia
- Interactive map of Kennedy Lake Provincial Park
- Location: Clayoquot Sound, British Columbia, Canada
- Coordinates: 49°02′20″N 125°35′00″W
- Area: 241 ha (600 acres)
- Established: July 12, 1995
- Governing body: BC Parks

Kennedy Lake Provincial Park is a provincial park in British Columbia, Canada located on the SW side of Kennedy Lake, SE of Tofino, British Columbia adjacent to the Pacific Rim National Park Reserve. The park has day use facilities only.

== See also ==
- Clayoquot Sound Biosphere Reserve
