= Flores Island Marine Provincial Park =

Provincial park on Flores Island in British Columbia, Canada

Flores Island Provincial Park
- IUCN category II (national park)
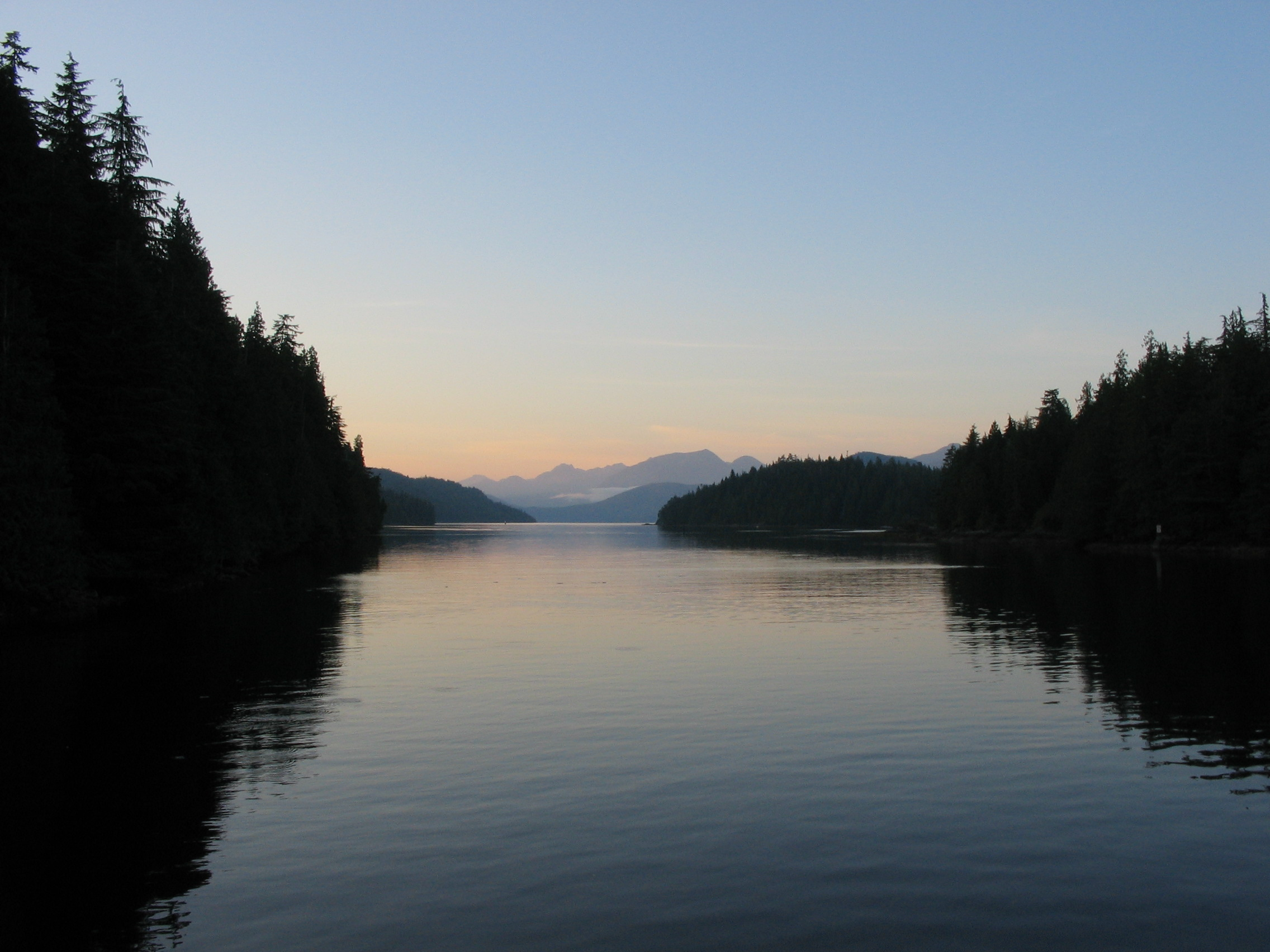
- Flores Island

- Location within British Columbia
- Interactive map of Flores Island Provincial Park
- Location: Alberni-Clayoquot RD, British Columbia
- Nearest city: Tofino
- Coordinates: 49°17′15″N 126°11′30″W
- Area: 7,113 ha (27.46 sq mi)
- Created: 12 July 1995
- Governing body: BC Parks

Flores Island Marine Provincial Park, also known as Flores Island Provincial Park, is a provincial park in British Columbia, Canada, located on the island of the same name in the central Clayoquot Sound region of the West Coast of Vancouver Island, British Columbia, Canada. The park contains 7113 ha. and was created on July 13, 1995, as part of the Clayoqout Land-Use Decision. Gibson Marine Provincial Park, which was created in 1967, adjoins it to the southeast. Sulphur Passage Provincial Park is off the northeast coast of Flores Island, surrounding Obstruction Island.

== See also ==
- Marktosis, British Columbia
- Vargas Island Provincial Park
