= Hesquiat Lake Provincial Park =

Provincial park in British Columbia, Canada

- IUCN category Ia (strict nature reserve)
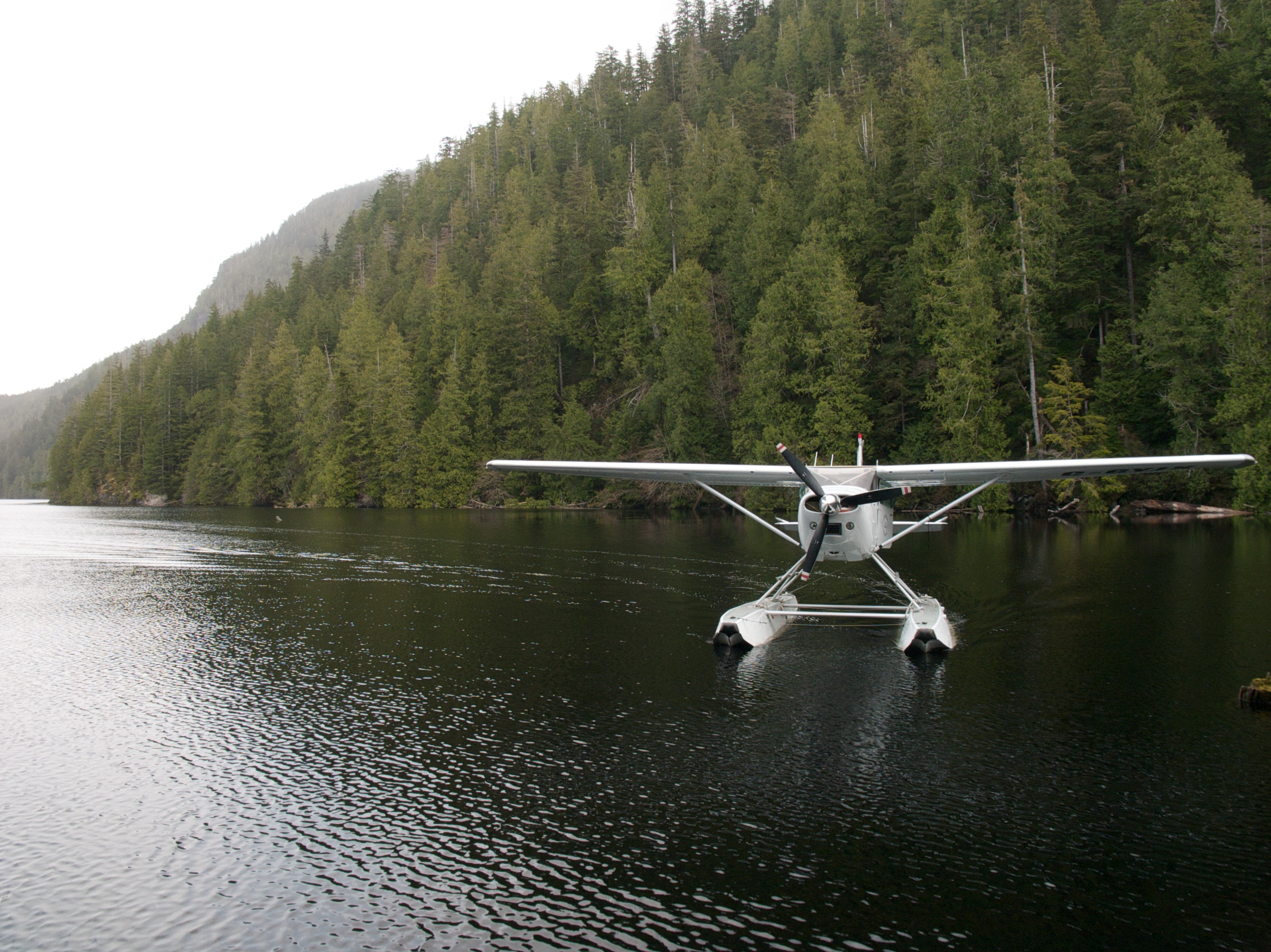
- A floatplane parked at the southern end of Hesquiat Lake. The park itself is located 2.5 km further north.

- Location within British Columbia
- Interactive map of Hesquiat Lake Provincial Park
- Location: Clayoquot Sound, British Columbia, Canada
- Coordinates: 49°30′07″N 126°23′17″W
- Area: 62 ha (150 acres)
- Established: April 5, 2001
- Governing body: BC Parks

Hesquiat Lake Provincial Park is a provincial park located on the west coast of Vancouver Island in British Columbia, Canada. It was established on April 5, 2001, to mature coastal forests of Western hemlock, western red cedar and lodgepole pine along the eastern shores of Hesquiat Lake.

== See also ==
- Clayoquot Sound Biosphere Reserve
- Hesquiat Peninsula Provincial Park
