= Kennedy River Bog Provincial Park =

Provincial park on Vancouver Island in British Columbia, Canada

- IUCN category III (natural monument or feature)
- Location within British Columbia
- Interactive map of Kennedy River Bog Provincial Park
- Location: Clayoquot Sound, British Columbia, Canada
- Nearest town: Tofino
- Coordinates: 49°05′49″N 125°37′19″W
- Area: 11 ha (27 acres)
- Established: July 12, 1995
- Governing body: BC Parks

Kennedy River Bog Provincial Park is a provincial park in British Columbia, Canada, located on the south side of the Kennedy River, downstream from Kennedy Lake.

== See also ==
- Clayoquot Sound Biosphere Reserve
