= Cougar Annie =

Canadian-American pioneer

Coordinates: 49°28′44″N 126°25′22″W

- Born: June 19, 1888; Sacramento, California, U.S.
- Died: April 28, 1985 (aged 96); Port Alberni, British Columbia, Canada

Ada Annie Rae-Arthur, later Ada Annie Lawson but better known as Cougar Annie, (June 19, 1888 – April 28, 1985) was a pioneer who settled near Hesquiat Harbour at Boat Basin in Clayoquot Sound on the west coast of Vancouver Island, Canada.

== Early years ==
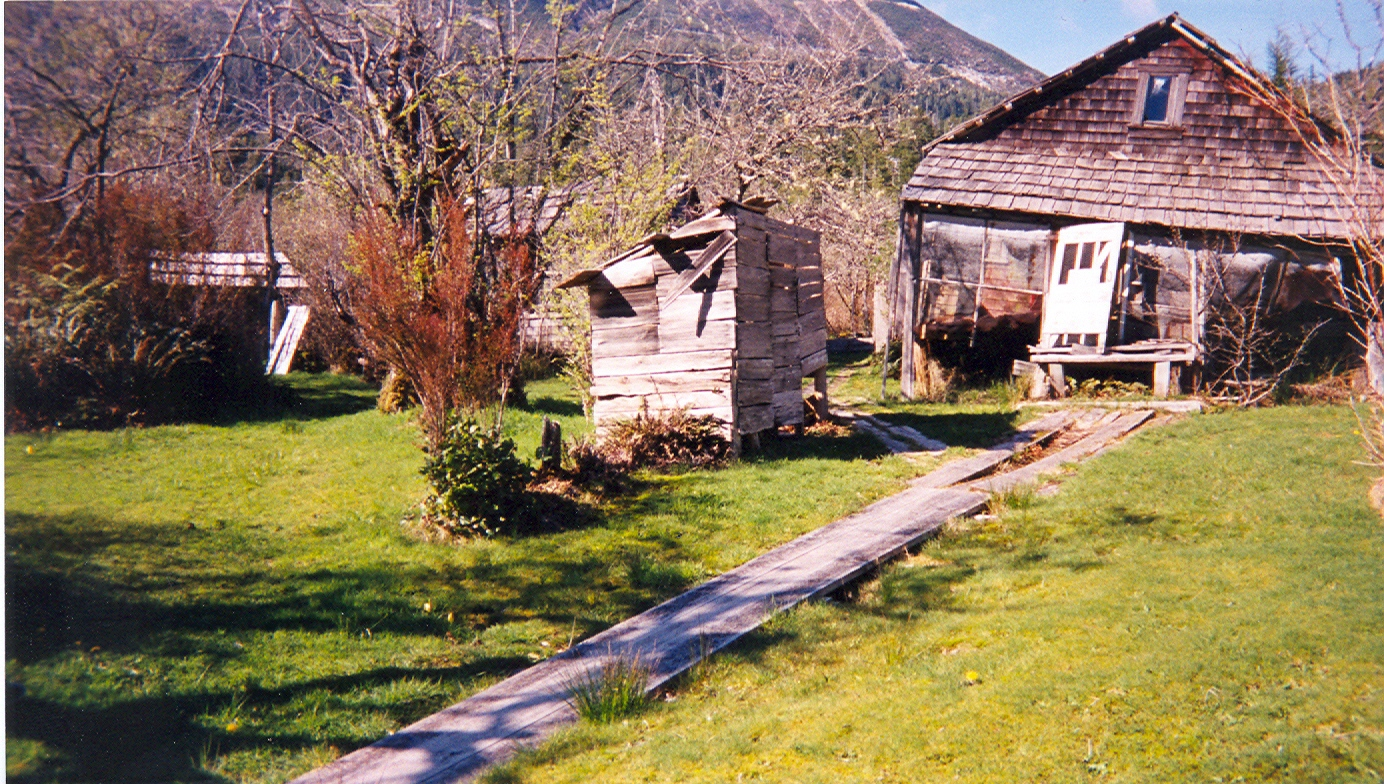
Cougar Annie's House in 1998

Born Ada Annie Jordan in Sacramento, California, she moved to the land where she was to live for more than 65 years from Vancouver, British Columbia in 1915 after having lived in England, South Africa and the Canadian Prairies as a child. She arrived with the first of her four husbands to save him from an opium addiction and ensure that the remittance cheques that came from his family in Scotland would continue to arrive. At the time she and her husband settled on the coast, they had three small children. She gave birth to eight more children in this remote location. She acquired her nickname because of her famed marksmanship. She shot dozens of cougars during her long life.

== Stories ==
After the death of her first husband Willie Rae-Arthur in 1936, she advertised in The Western Producer saying "BC Widow with Nursery and orchard wishes partner. Widower preferred. Object matrimony." The new husband she chose from several candidates died at their home in 1944 of an accidental gunshot wound to the leg. The story goes he was cleaning his gun and didn't realize that there was a cartridge still in the chamber. Her third husband was produced by the same advertisement, and after his death of pneumonia in 1955, she ran another ad, this time seeking a widower. In 1942 the lighthouse at Estevan Point was shelled by a Japanese submarine. Annie claimed to have seen the submarine surface in the harbour before the lighthouse was shelled and to have found a shell on the beach in front of her land.

== The garden ==
With little help, Annie cleared 5 acres (20,000 m^{2}) of her land and planted a sprawling garden. The garden was a source of income throughout her life, as she sold bulbs and plants by mail. She also operated a general store and post office from her plot of land. Another source of income over the years was a bounty offered for Cougars that ranged from $10 to $40. The numbers of cats that she claimed to have killed continued to increase into her old age but in 1955 she received bounties for 10 cats. At that time she claimed to have killed 62 cougars and about 80 bears. She killed the cougars and bears because they preyed on the goats and chickens that she raised.

Her livelihood depended upon the regular visits of the Canadian Pacific Steamships Line Princess Maquinna that arrived every 10 days in Hesquiat Harbour from 1913 to 1952 on her rounds from Victoria to Port Alice.

Annie rarely left the property where she lived until well into her nineties. Ailing and mostly blind, she was removed to Port Alberni, where she died at the age of 97.

== The garden recovered ==
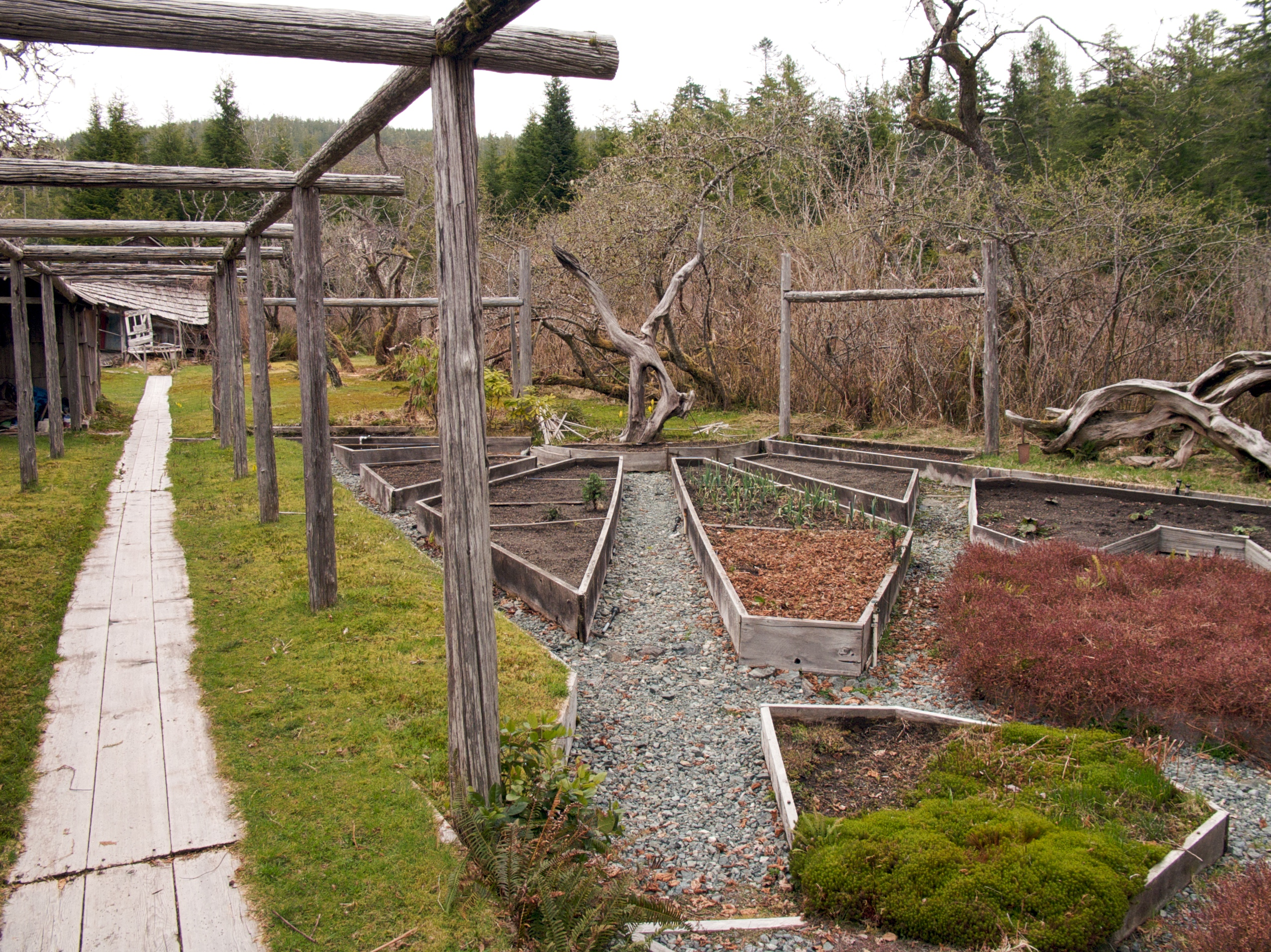
Cougar Annie's Garden, 2008

Her friend Peter Buckland, a retired Vancouver stockbroker, bought the property from her estate in 1985 and spent nearly fifteen years restoring the garden. He established the non-profit Boat Basin Foundation to manage the garden, which built and in 2007 opened the Temperate Rainforest Field Study Centre on a ridge overlooking the garden, in partnership with Ecotrust Canada and the Hesquiaht First Nation. In August 2010, the property was listed for sale, the study centre having been found to be not financially viable. NOTE: The sale of this property has been halted due to the "unmarked" cemetery, including Ada's ashes and her first husband Willie. Family members and Peter Buckland were shown by Ada where most of the graves are, as Ada never put up a marker, she just planted something nice on top.

The garden has re-opened after seven years to small groups of people. It will seasonally open to the public on a limited basis (Fridays and Sundays) and is accessible by float plane from Tofino, or by hikers and kayakers.

== See also ==
- Hesquiat Peninsula Provincial Park
- Hesquiaht First Nation
