= Walk On By (disambiguation) =

"Walk On By" is a song first recorded by Dionne Warwick and then covered by several other artists.

Walk On By may also refer to:

- Walk On By (album), a 1966 album by jazz organist Brother Jack McDuff
- "Walk On By" (Leroy Van Dyke song)
- "Walk On By", a b-side from the Britney Spears single "Stronger"
- "Walk On By", a song by Cake from Prolonging the Magic
- "Walk On By", a song by Fat Joe from Don Cartagena
- "Walk On By", a song by Logic from Young Sinatra: Welcome To Forever
- "Walk On By", a song by Miss Kittin & The Hacker from First Album
- "Walk On By", a song by Thundercat from Drunk
- "Walk On By", a song by Young Deenay from Birth

== See also ==
- Sybil (album), a 1989 album titled Walk On By in the UK
- Walk On By: The Story of Popular Song, a BBC documentary series that was nominated for a 2002 British Academy Television Award
