= Walking on water =

Walking on water is an example of a superhuman task associated with some cultures. It may refer to:

- A Japanese myth about ninja, thought to be associated with Mizugumo.
- Jesus walking on water, in the Christian gospels
- Animal locomotion on the water surface

Walk on the Water, Walk on Water or Walking on Water may also refer to:

== Film and television ==
- Summer's End (film) or Walk on Water, 1999 film
- Walk on Water (film), 2004 Israeli film
- Walking on Water (2002 film), Australian film
- Walking on Water (2018 film), documentary film
- "Walk on Water" (Grey's Anatomy), a 2007 television episode
- "Walking on Water" (Waking the Dead), a 2003 television episode

== Music ==
- Walk on Water (band), a Swedish contemporary Christian music band

=== Albums ===
- Walk on the Water (album), a 1980 album by Gerry Mulligan
- Walk on Water (Jerry Harrison album) (1990)
- Walk on Water (Katrina and the Waves album) (1997)
- Walk on Water (UFO album) (1995)

=== Songs ===
- "Walk on the Water", a 1968 song by Creedence Clearwater Revival on the band's eponymous debut album
- "Walk on the Water" (song), a 2009 song by Britt Nicole
- "Walk on Water" (Aerosmith song) (1994)
- "Walk on Water" (Basshunter song) (2009)
- "Walk on Water" (Eddie Money song) (1988)
- "Walk on Water" (Eminem song) (2017)
- "Walk on Water" (G.E.M. song) (2019)
- "Walk on Water" (Ira Losco song) (2016)
- "Walk on Water" (Thirty Seconds to Mars song) (2017)
- "Walkin on Water", a 2024 song by Stray Kids
- "Walk on the Water", a 1969 song by Blodwyn Pig from Ahead Rings Out
- "Walk on Water", a 1972 song by Neil Diamond from Moods
- "Walk on Water", a 1990 song by Dio from Lock Up the Wolves
- "Walk on Water", a 1995 song by Audio Adrenaline from Bloom
- "Walk on Water", a 1996 song by Ozzy Osbourne from the Beavis and Butt-Head Do America soundtrack
- "Walk on Water", a 2000 song by Milk Inc. from Land of the Living
- "Walk on Water", a 2017 song by ASAP Mob from Cozy Tapes Vol. 2: Too Cozy
- "Walk on Water", a 2015 song by Kat Dahlia from My Garden
- "Walk on Water", a 2015 song by Family Force 5 from Time Stands Still
- "Walking on Water", a 2018 song by Needtobreathe from Hard Love
