= Nism̓aakqin Marine Provincial Park and Protected Area =

Provincial park in British Columbia, Canada

- IUCN category III (natural monument or feature)
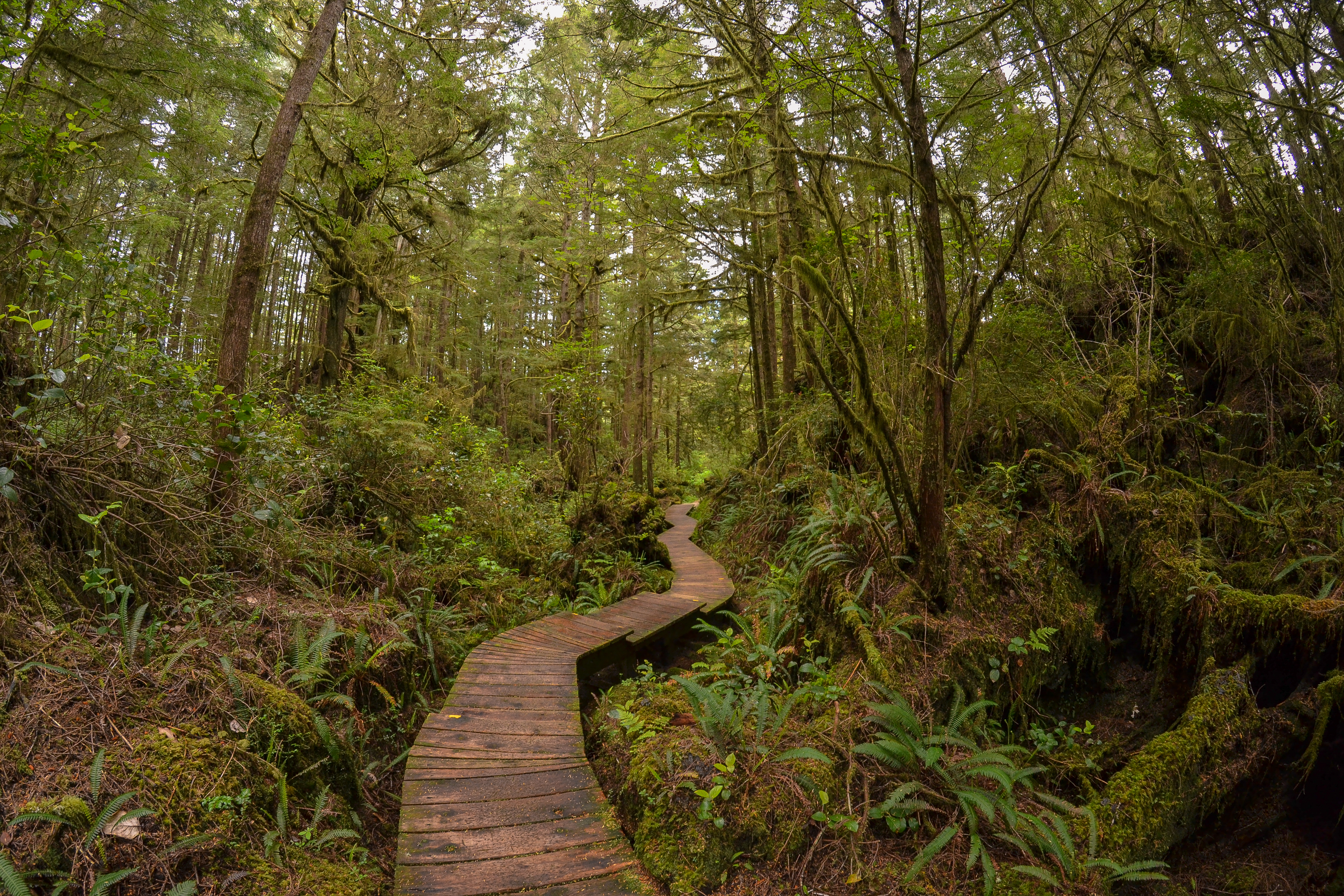
- Nism̓aakqin Marine Provincial Park and Protected Area

- Location within British Columbia
- Interactive map of Nism̓aakqin Marine Provincial Park and Protected Area
- Location: Clayoquot Sound, British Columbia, Canada
- Coordinates: 49°24′00″N 126°20′30″W
- Area: 2,563 ha (9.90 sq mi)
- Established: January 7, 1955
- Governing body: BC Parks

Nism̓aakqin Marine Provincial Park and Protected Area, formerly known as Maquinna Marine Provincial Park and Protected Area, is a provincial park in British Columbia, Canada, located northwest of Tofino in the Clayoquot Sound region of the West Coast of Vancouver Island, protecting Ramsay Hot Springs, which is the name-source of the cove, settlement and former post office of Hot Springs Cove.

The Maquinna Marine Park was renamed Nism̓aakqin Park in March 2025. The name Nism̓aakqin (pronounced nis-mock-kin) means “our land that we care for” in Nuu-chah-nulth.

== See also ==
- Clayoquot Sound Biosphere Reserve
- Maquinna
- Marktosis
