= Kennedy Lake (Vancouver Island) =

Lake on Vancouver Island, British Columbia, Canada

- haʔuukmin (Nuu-chah-nulth)
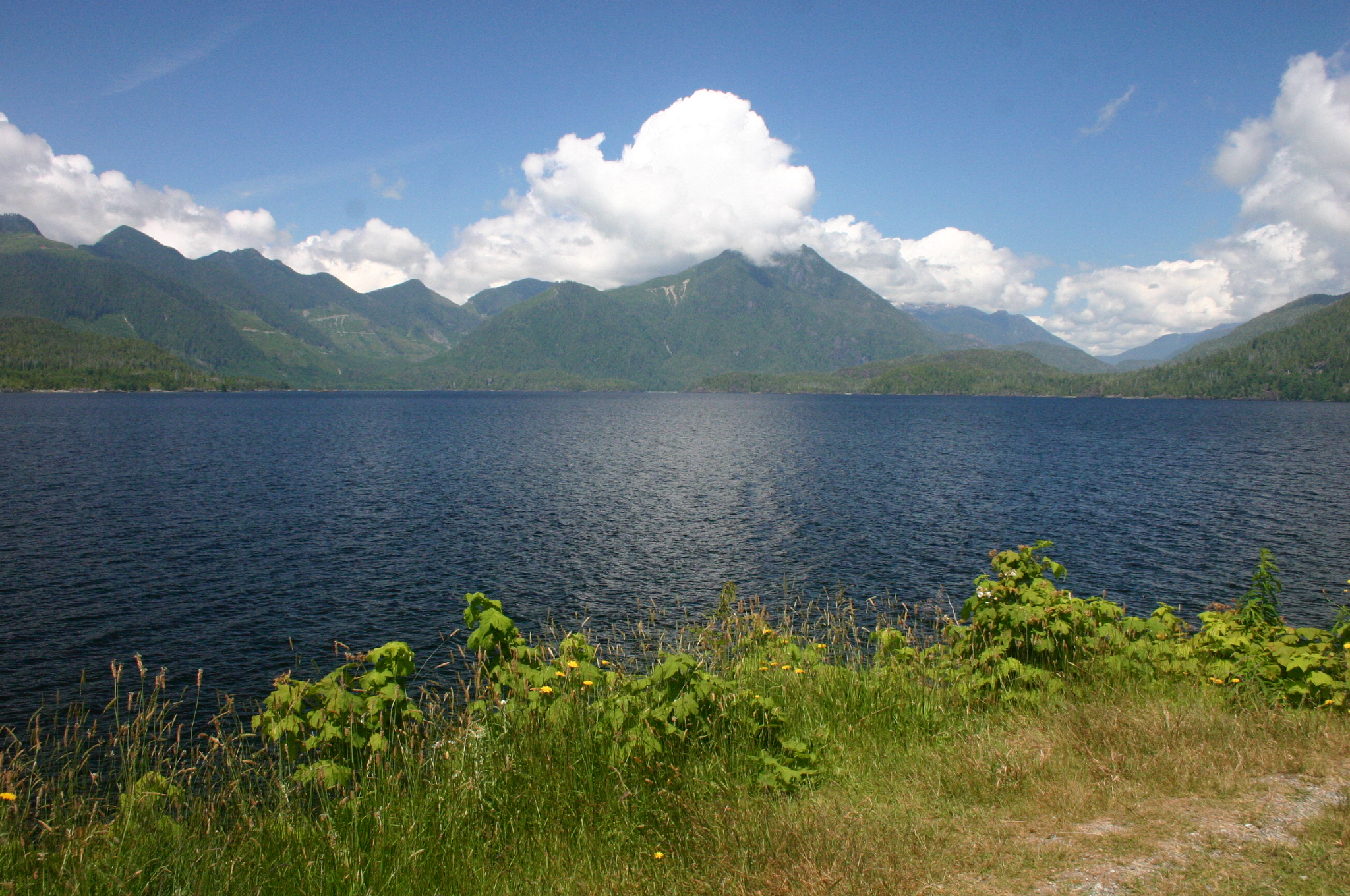

- Location within Vancouver Island
- Location: Vancouver Island, British Columbia
- Coordinates: 49°3′N 125°33′W
- Primary inflows: Clayoquot River, Kennedy River, Sand River
- Basin countries: Canada
- Surface area: 6,475 ha (16,000 acres)
- Average depth: 38 m (125 ft)
- Max. depth: 145 m (476 ft)
- Residence time: 1.1 year
- Shore length^{1}: 111.9 km (69.5 mi)
- Surface elevation: 12 m (39 ft)
- ^{1} Shore length is not a well-defined measure.

Kennedy Lake (Nuu-chah-nulth: haʔuukmin) is the largest lake on Vancouver Island, British Columbia, Canada. Located north of Ucluelet on the island's central west coast, the lake is formed chiefly by the confluence of the Clayoquot and Kennedy Rivers. Outflow is via a short stretch of the Kennedy River into Tofino Inlet. The lake includes an extensive northern arm called Clayoquot Arm.

The lake and the surrounding region's natural beauty have led to portions of it being protected from the logging industry. Parks adjacent to the lake include Clayoquot Plateau Provincial Park, Pacific Rim National Park, Clayoquot Arm Provincial Park, Kennedy Lake Provincial Park, Kennedy River Bog Provincial Park and the Clayoquot Arm Beach recreation site. The lake is a popular recreation destination for camping, boating and fishing. It is an important spawning habitat for sockeye and various species of salmon and trout, and lies within the Coastal Western Hemlock Biogeoclimatic Zone.

The lake is part of the ancestral lands of the Tla-o-qui-aht First Nations, and is named for the last governor of the Colony of Vancouver Island, Sir Arthur Kennedy.

== Geography ==
Kennedy Lake has a surface area of 6,475 hectares (16,000 acres), making it the largest lake on Vancouver Island. It has an irregular shape made up of two basins, referred to as the Main Arm and the Clayoquot Arm, connected by a narrow sill. While the mean depth of the lake is 38 metres (125 ft), the sill dividing the two arms is less than 10 metres (33 ft) in depth, while the deepest part of the lake reaches 145 metres (476 ft). The lake is situated at 12 metres (39 ft) above sea level.

British Columbia Highway 4 winds along the south-east and southern side of the lake, the only highway accessing the communities of Ucluelet and Tofino.

== See also ==
- List of lakes of British Columbia
- Clayoquot Sound
