= Vargas Island Provincial Park =

Provincial park in British Columbia, Canada

- IUCN category II (national park)
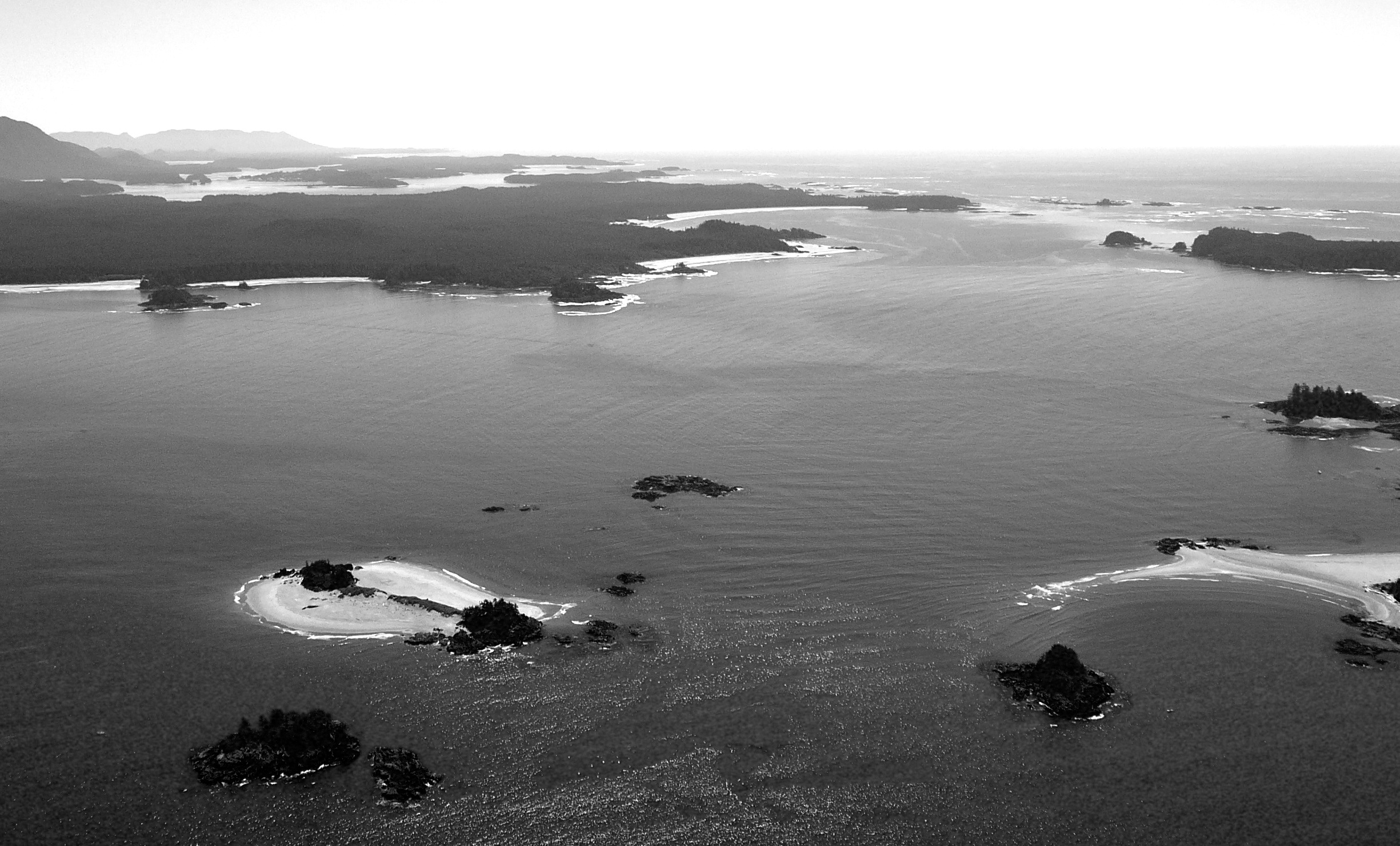
- Aerial view of Vargas Island Provincial Park

- Location within Vancouver Island Location within British Columbia
- Interactive map of Vargas Island Provincial Park
- Location: Clayoquot Sound, British Columbia, Canada
- Nearest city: Tofino
- Coordinates: 49°10′45″N 126°01′40″W
- Area: 5,805 ha (22.41 sq mi)
- Established: July 13, 1995
- Governing body: BC Parks

Vargas Island Provincial Park is a provincial park in British Columbia, Canada, comprising the west side of the island of the same name, which is located west of Meares Island and northwest of the resort community of Tofino in the Clayoquot Sound region of the West Coast of Vancouver Island, British Columbia, Canada.

The park was created as part of the Clayoquot Land-Use Decision on July 13, 1995 and contains 5,805 hectares (14,340 acres), 1,543 hectares (3,810 acres) of it being upland and 4,262 hectares (10,530 acres) being foreshore. Also located on Vargas Island, on its north side, is Epper Passage Provincial Park.

== Fauna ==
This island is home to the mammalian species of black bear, cougar, and wolf. There is some concern about wolves in the parks becoming habituated, after two wolves had to be killed because of their attack on a male sleeping camper on July 2, 2000.

For both human safety and the future of the wolf population in Clayoquot Sound, food must be stored out of reach of wildlife and animals must not be approached or fed by visitors.

== Etymology ==
The island is apparently named for Diego de Vargas, who regained New Mexico for Spain in 1693–94.

== See also ==
- Flores Island Marine Provincial Park
- Hesquiat Peninsula Provincial Park
