= Tranquil Creek Provincial Park =

Provincial park in British Columbia, Canada

- IUCN category II (national park)
- Location within Vancouver Island Location within British Columbia
- Interactive map of Tranquil Creek Provincial Park
- Location: Clayoquot Sound, British Columbia, Canada
- Coordinates: 49°19′00″N 125°37′10″W
- Area: 299 ha (740 acres)
- Established: July 12, 1995
- Governing body: BC Parks

Tranquil Creek Provincial Park is a provincial park in British Columbia, Canada, located at the head of the Kennedy River, east of the head of Bedwell Sound on Vancouver Island.

== See also ==
- Clayoquot Sound Biosphere Reserve
