= Walk on the Wild Side =

Walk on the Wild Side may refer to:

- A Walk on the Wild Side, a 1956 novel by Nelson Algren
  - Walk on the Wild Side (film), a 1962 film adapted from Algren's novel
  - "Walk on the Wild Side" (David and Bernstein song) the title song of the film, written by Mack David and Elmer Bernstein
- "Walk on the Wild Side" (Lou Reed song), 1972
- Walk on the Wild Side: The Best of Lou Reed, a 1977 album
- Walk on the Wild Side (TV series), a 2009–2010 British comedy sketch show
- Walk on the Wild Side, a British TV documentary produced by Daniel Abineri

== See also ==
- Take a Walk on the Wildside, a 2017 Canadian documentary film
