= Flores Island (British Columbia) =

Island in Clayoquot Sound in British Columbia, Canada

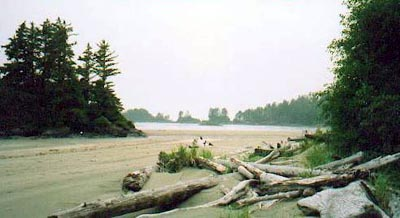
- A wild beach on Flores Island

- Location within British Columbia Location within Canada

Geography
- Location: Clayoquot Sound, off the west coast of Vancouver Island
- Coordinates: 49°12′29″N 126°08′57″W
- Area: 155 km^{2} (60 sq mi)

Administration
- Canada
- Province: British Columbia
- Regional District: Alberni-Clayoquot

Demographics
- Population: 760 (2021)
- Ethnic groups: Nuu-chah-nulth

Additional information
- Time zone: PST (UTC−8)
  - Summer (DST): PDT (UTC−7)

Flores Island is an island (approximately 155 km^{2} (60 sq mi)) in Clayoquot Sound, off the west coast of Vancouver Island, British Columbia, Canada.

The area of Marktosis (population around 900) is the island's only major settlement. Most residents are members of the Ahousaht nation (population around 2000) and form the largest part of the Nuu-chah-nulth or Nootka First Nation. Some of the indigenous language is spoken, though English is predominant.

Residing within the Clayoquot Sound Biosphere Reserve, Flores contains one of the largest tracts of contiguous old-growth forest on Vancouver Island. 41 km^{2} (16 sq mi) of the island has been demarcated as the Flores Island Marine Provincial Park. The island is home to 71 registered culturally modified trees, protection is established under Section 27 of the Clayoquot Sound Interim Measures Extension Agreement. At 1.43 km^{2} (0.55 sq mi) in area is Gibson Marine Provincial Park. There are hot springs at the southern banks of the Matilda Inlet. The Marktosis reservation is 1.2 km^{2} (0.46 sq mi) ; the rest of the island is Crown land.

The island was named in 1791 by Francisco de Eliza, in honor of Manuel Antonio Flórez, 51st viceroy of New Spain.

Fishing is the island's main industry. Tourism is promoted through the 'Walk the Wild Side' hiking trail and accommodations at the Aauuknuck Lodge. Cow Bay on the island's west side has been voted one of Canada's top ten beaches.

The island can be reached by water taxi or seaplane from Tofino.

== See also ==
- List of islands of British Columbia
- British Columbia Coast
