= Hesquiat Peninsula Provincial Park =

Provincial park on Vancouver Island in British Columbia, Canada

- IUCN category Ib (wilderness area)
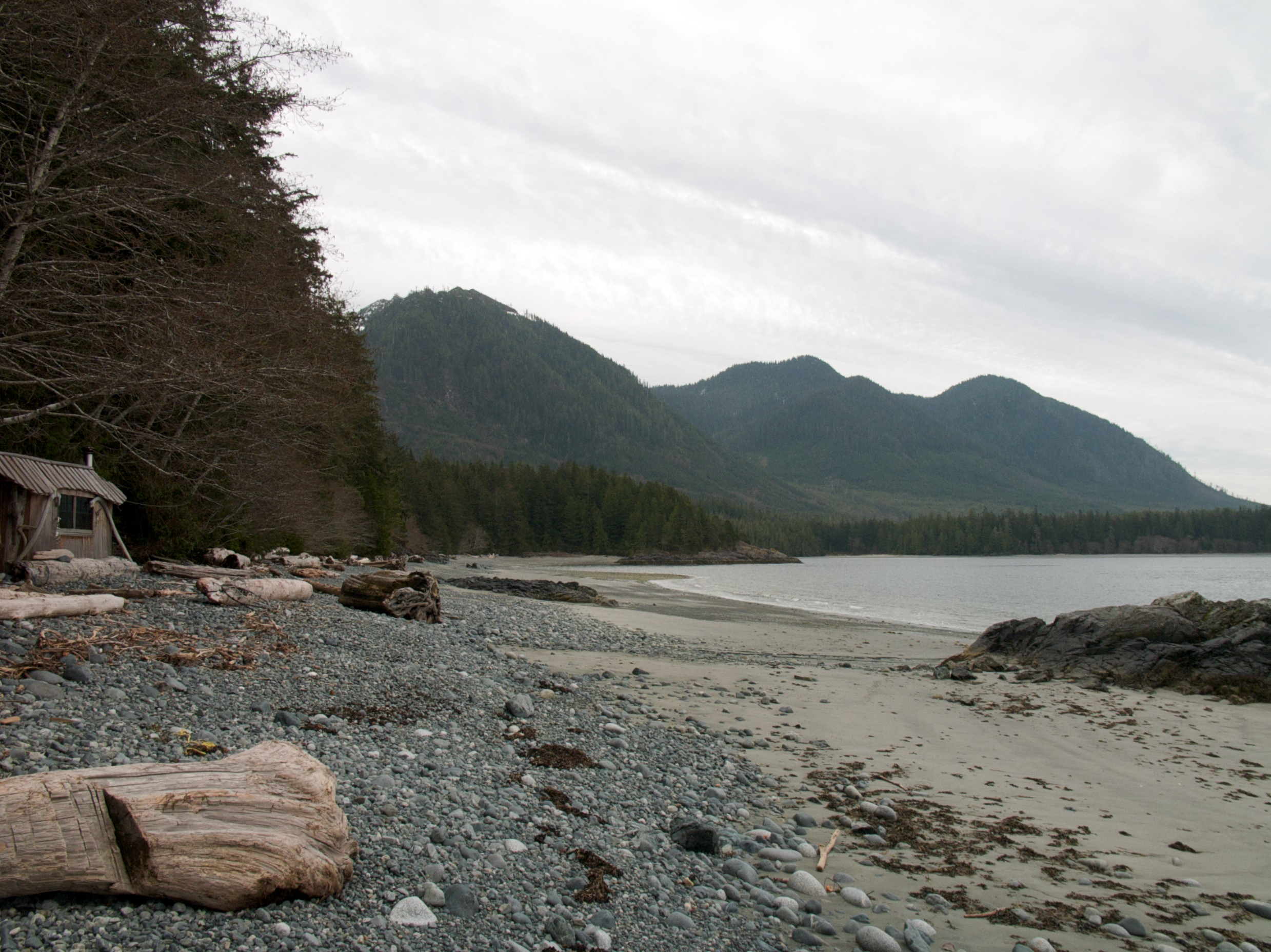
- Hesquiat Harbour, located at the eastern end of Hesquiat Peninsula Provincial Park

- Location within British Columbia
- Interactive map of Hesquiat Peninsula Provincial Park
- Location: Vancouver Island, British Columbia, Canada
- Coordinates: 49°26′30″N 126°31′00″W
- Area: 7,888 ha (30.46 sq mi)
- Established: July 12, 1995
- Governing body: BC Parks

Hesquiat Peninsula Provincial Park is a provincial park at the western extremity of the Clayoquot Sound region of the West Coast of Vancouver Island, British Columbia, Canada. The park was established by order-in-council on July 12, 1995 as part of the Clayoquot Land-Use Decision.

== Geography ==
The Hesquiat Peninsula forms the division between the Clayoquot Sound region, to the south, and the Nootka Sound region to the north. The peninsula is named for the Hesquiaht group of the Nuu-chah-nulth peoples.

Hesquiat Reserve No. 1 and adjoining locality and former steamer landing of Hesquiat are located on its southeastern tip.

== History ==
The Hesquiaht group of the Nuu-chah-nulth peoples have lived in the area since time immemorial.

In 1915, Ada Annie Rae-Arthur, better known by her nickname "Cougar Annie", moved with her husband to Hesquiat Bay.

During World War II, in 1942, the Estevan Point lighthouse was fired upon by the Japanese submarine I-26, marking the first enemy attack on Canadian soil since the Fenian Raids of 1866 and 1871.

== See also ==
- Clayoquot Sound Biosphere Reserve
- Hesquiat Lake Provincial Park
