= Ahousaht First Nation =

Nuu-chah-nulth band government in British Columbia, Canada

Ahousaht
- Band No. 659
- ʕaaḥuusʔatḥ
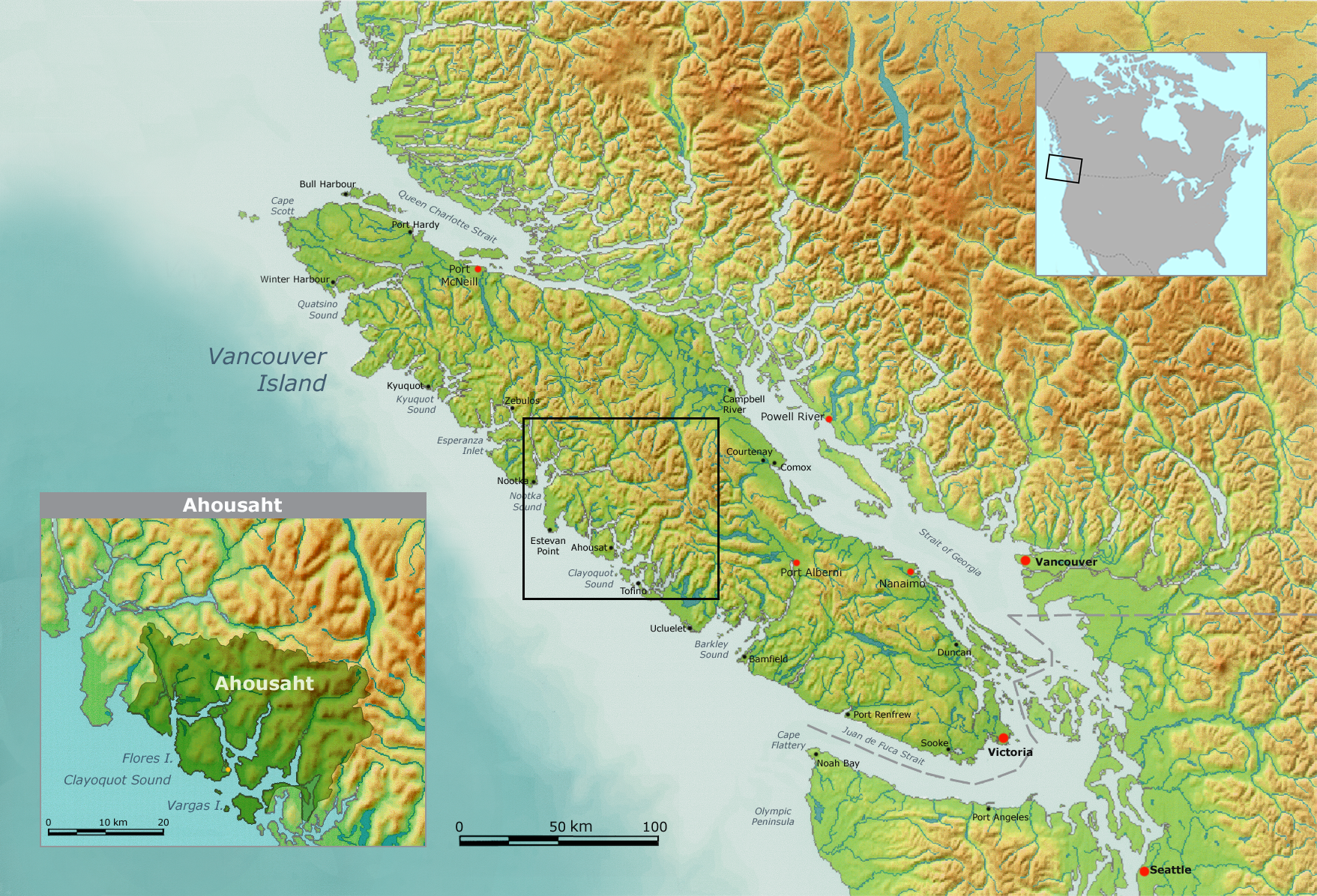
- Territory of Ahousaht First Nation
- People: Nuu-chah-nulth
- Headquarters: Ahousat
- Province: British Columbia

Land
- Main reserve: Marktosis 15
- Land area: 5.7 km^{2} (2.2 sq mi)

Population (2024)
- On reserve: 759
- On other land: 98
- Off reserve: 1377
- Total population: 2234

Government
- Chief: Rebecca Atleo

Website
- www.ahousaht.ca

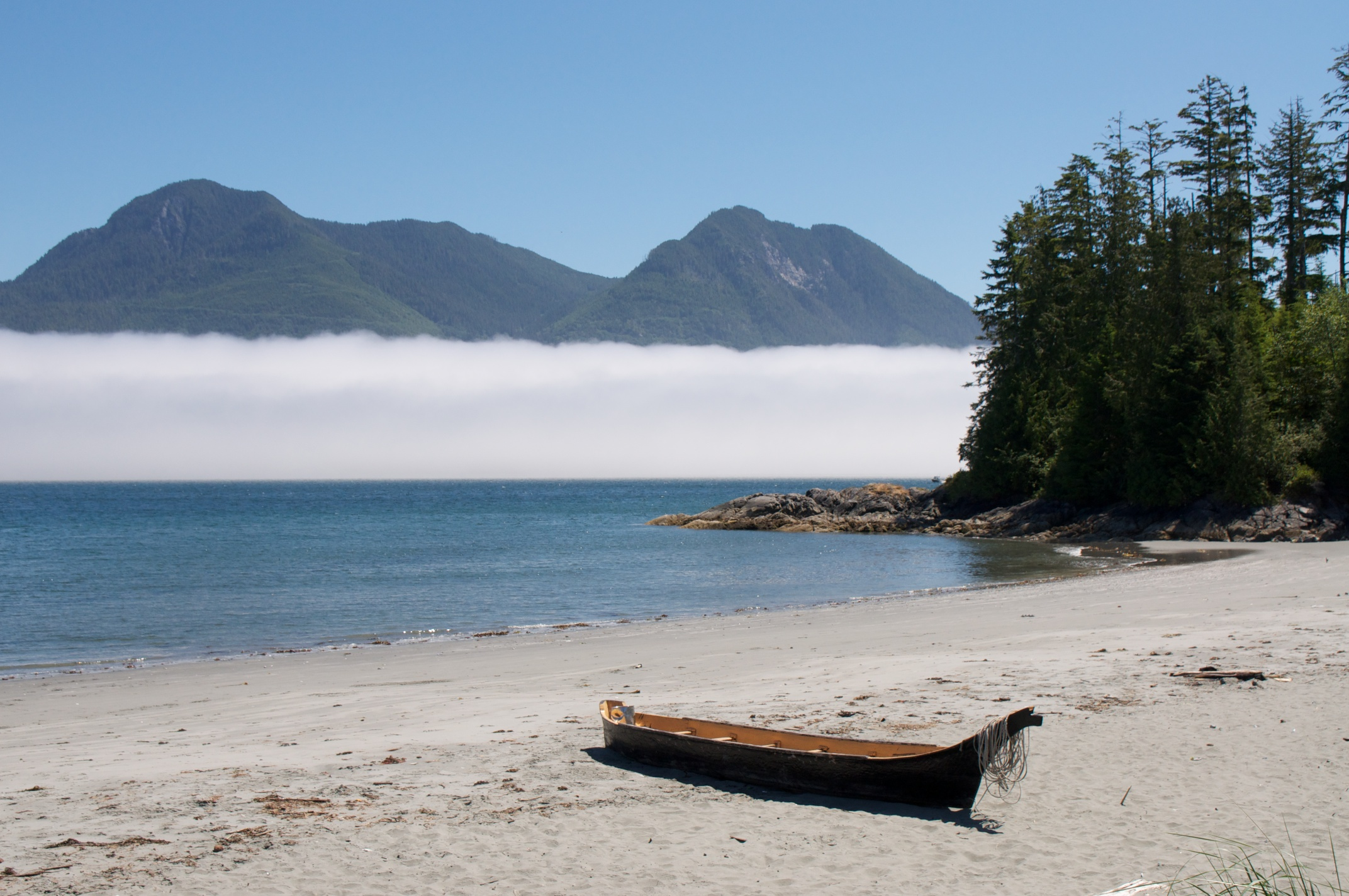
Ahousaht beach and traditional canoe

Ahousaht First Nation is a First Nation government based on the west coast of Vancouver Island in British Columbia, Canada. It administers the community of Ahousaht, British Columbia, which encompasses much of Clayoquot Sound. The Ahousaht are a member of the Nuu-chah-nulth Tribal Council. It is led by the Taayi Haw̓ił - Maquinna (Lewis George).

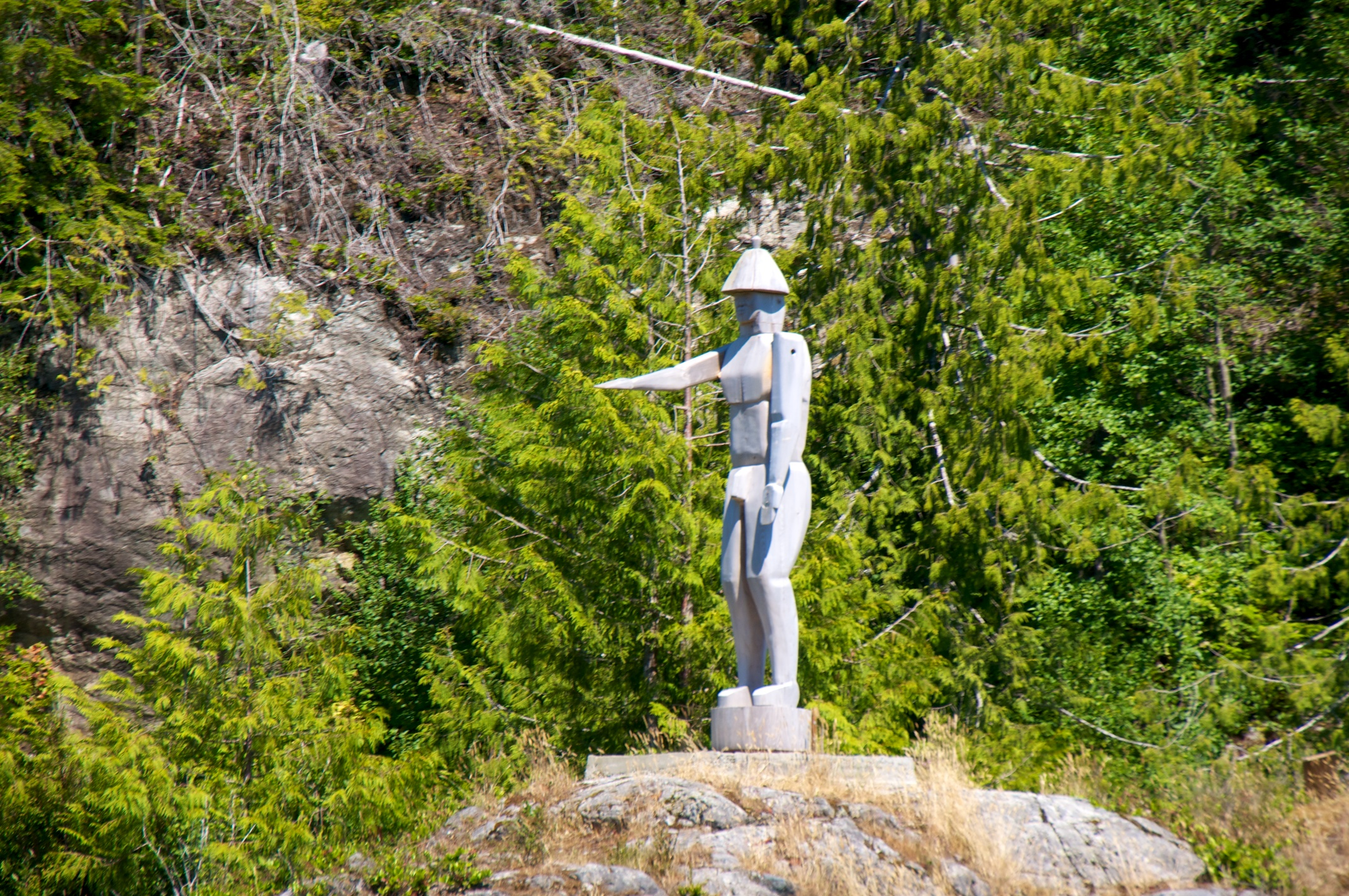
Ahousaht welcome figure, carved by George John

Ahousaht has about 2,214 members, and about 36% live in Marktosis Indian Reserve No. 15 on Flores Island. ("Marktosis" is an English transliteration of Maaqtusiis, the name of the reserve in the Nuu-chah-nulth language). The Ahousaht Nation is the most populous First Nation on the west coast of Vancouver Island.

== Introduction ==
Ahousaht First Nation is the largest among the Nuu-chah-nulth peoples. The Nation is a confederation of multiple former groups: the Ahousaht (ʕaaḥuusʔatḥ), Manhousaht (Maan̓uusʔatḥ), Kelthsmaht (qiłcmaʔatḥ), Paneetl-aht (Paniiƛʔatḥ), Qwatswiaht (Qʷaacwiiʔatḥ), O-inmitisaht (Ḥuuʔinmitisʔatḥ), and Otsosaht (ʕuc̓uusʔahtḥ). These groups began to join as a confederation before the arrival of the Europeans to their respective shores.

Ahousaht is named after the village of Ahous (ʕaaḥuus) on the west side of Vargas Island, with the people of ʕaaḥuusʔatḥ being called the "People with their backs to the mountains and land". The Nation's territory encompasses much of Clayoquot Sound. Some 36 percent of Ahousaht members live at Marktosis Indian Reserve (IR # 15), located on Flores Island north of Tofino. Marktosis has a large community hall, a gym, a youth center, a restaurant, a health center, and a school for children K-12. Work has begun to expand the elementary/high school better to meet the needs of the students and the community.

Ahousaht's population of approximately 1900 people has been growing at an average rate of 2.6% per year; it is projected to increase to 3125 by 2024. Seventy-seven percent of members are under 40 years of age and 41 percent are under 19 years.

Marktosis is the only one of 24 Ahousaht reserves that is occupied year-round. Others, on Vancouver Island, Vargas Island and other locations on Flores Island, are traditional fishing stations and areas of seasonal resource extraction. They are not habitable for year-round settlement. Many of these historic reserves, designated by the government of the day, tended to mark the general areas that were inhabited by the various members of the nation at the time of contact. It was only after contact and other changes that many Ahousaht members came to live on I.R 15 (Marktosis). All Ahousaht reserves are accessible only by boat or floatplane. The Nation reports that many members living "away from home" have a strong interest in returning to their traditional territory if housing and employment were available.

The land reserves of the Ahousaht, and of neighboring coastal nations, are relatively small in size compared to the size of the population. They believe that the reserve designations may have been small because members of the Ahousaht nation, at the time of contact, did not occupy extensive territory on land. They relied strongly on oceanic resources as their main staple of dietary and other needs. The ocean was considered to be "the garden" of the people; hence, colonial authorities may have assumed that the people needed little land-base to supply their long-term needs.

The Ahousaht is known for is its tradition of song and dance. The young men, led by Joseph George Sr., offer a voice for the nation when performing their art. A new group, the Soulshakers, has become known for continuing to share this history of song and also for composing new songs/dances to share with family, friends and outsiders in the audience.

== Hereditary system ==
The role of the Ḥaw̓iiḥ (hereditary chiefs) in the Ahousaht governing system is to look after their Ḥahuułi (territory and resources). The Ahousaht people have maintained their reliance of the Ḥaw̓iiḥ. Under the Ḥaw̓iiḥ system, laws outline chieftainships and governance. The keepers of these laws are the Witwaak.

No Ḥaw̓ił is considered above the law. Every hereditary chief has advisors to ensure the chief does not make an entirely independent decision. His council (not the elected council, per se; rather, the people who are advisors to the chief) is depended upon for reliable advice before he makes any decision for Ahousaht. No Ḥaw̓ił speaks for himself, unless he has good news, or something good to share. All Ḥaw̓iiḥ have speakers or spokesmen, who are trained from an early age for these duties. Speakers must be fluent in Nuu-chah-nultha and have a very strong knowledge of the history of the Ḥaw̓ił seat (including lineage) and his ḥaḥuułi.

Some analysts have described the Ḥaw̓iiḥ system as being similar to fiefdoms, but the Ahousaht describe it as a more inter-connected system of governance, with numerous accountability mechanisms. No Ha’wiith can hold tremendous power without the support of numerous people who are the bearers of customary laws.

Each Ḥaw̓ił holds a Ḥaḥuułi that includes land, sea, resources and people within his territory. This had clearly defined boundaries, and people who watched over the boundaries between indigenous nations. The Ahousaht have stories in history that emphasize the importance of the boundaries are and how they were protected.

Ḥaw̓iiḥ have the power to create t̓iquwił, a seat. (It is a distinction related to historic "nobles" in European history.) The chief may grant a person a smaller portion of the territory, to own and care for, in return for great service to the nation and the chief. History tells of two, which were created by the Ḥaw̓iiḥ to recognize the constant support provided by these two individuals. Their importance was such that, at a potlatch, they were recognized before the Ḥaw̓ił when a Ḥaw̓iiḥ dance was performed.

The Ahousaht have oral history, which goes back 17 or 18 generations, of all of the Ḥaw̓iiḥ. It tells of when one hereditary position became three. Each Ḥaw̓ił heads up a "house" and each "house" has a name. Maquinna is the taayi (the head-ranked Ḥaw̓ił of Ahousaht).

As a collective, the three Ḥaw̓iiḥ comprise the principal Hereditary Chiefs of Ahousaht. Currently these individuals are:

- Mukʷina: Lewis George
- ƛakišwaya: JJ Keitlah
- Ah-in-chut: Shawn Atleo - Shawn was given the secondary name A-aap wa-iik in a formal ceremony to mark his becoming leader of the Assembly of First Nations, a position which he held from 2009 to 2014.

Ḥaw̓iiḥ of the four tribes that amalgamated with Ahousaht: Kelthsmaht – Vargas Island, Manhousaht, Qwaacwiiaht, and Oo-in-mitis, continue to be recognized as principal Ḥaw̓iiḥ. These individuals are:

- For Kelthsmaht: Hanuukʷii (Christian Charlie)
- For Manhousaht: ʔuuʔkʷaʔqum (James Swan)
- For Qwaacwiiaht: Tupmuuł (Ron George)

The Oo-in-mitis seat is currently vacant.

A person is also appointed to the official role of welcoming visitors. Ḥaayuupinuuł (Bill Keitlah Jr.) currently serves that role as a ḥaw̓ił for the Ahousaht. Keitlah Jr. acquired the seat from his father, Bill Keitlah Sr., in 2004.

In the case of Kelthsmaht, the beach keeper (welcoming person) was appointed or had a t̓iquwił. He is Kanupiit (Steven Titian).

The Ahousaht Taayii haw̓ił , Maquinna (Lewis George), inherited the seat from his late father, Earl George. Earl George first passed the seat to his eldest son, Uu-qua-qruum (Corbett George). When Uu-qua-qruum (Corbett George) encountered some difficulty in his life, Earl George took the seat back. Just prior to his passing, he named Maquinna (Lewis George) as his successor at Hupacasath. In November 2007, Maquinna (Lewis George) held a major potlatch to declare his seat.

Ah-in-chut (Shawn Atleo) acquired his seat from his father ʔuumiik (Dr. Richard Atleo). Ah-in-chut (Shawn Atleo) became the British Columbia Regional Chief of the Assembly of First Nations. More recently, he was elected as the overall leader of the Assembly of First Nations.

== Elected system ==
In addition to the governing body through the Ha’wiih, Ahousaht has a mandated body of elected officials. This is the Ahousaht chief and council. The number of councillors is determined by the overall size of the population. For every 100 members of a nation, there is to be elected one council member, to a maximum of 12 members (as per the Canadian Indian Act). The elected Council's role is to fulfill requirements of the Indian Act. Overall, both Ha’wiih and chief and council represent the Ahousaht membership and honour their history.

As changes were made in governing in the early 1950s, Ahousaht's first council was appointed by the Ha’wiih rather than elected by the membership. The late Paul Sam (Stanley Sam's father), was the first chief councillor. The Ahousaht adopted the elected representative system, as required by the Canadian Indian Act.

The councillors and chief councillor were usually elected on two-year terms; however, due to a court decision (Courbier decision) this has caused changes to be made, and Ahousaht are adopting a new process for holding elections. One significant change will be the change from two to four-year terms for councillors. Another important change is the expansion of the franchise to include all members of the nation. Previously, only those members living 'on-reserve' (I.R15 - Marktosis reserve) were allowed to participate as voters.

The council is responsible for appointments to other boards on behalf of the Ha’wiih.

== Business and economic development ==
The main economic activities in the Ahousaht community are tourism, finfish aquaculture, forestry and fishing (including shellfish). The latter two have declined in recent years. Members are employed seasonally in silviculture, water taxi transport, construction, tourism, forestry and aquaculture. There are five enterprises operated by Ahousaht Administration, including natural resources, tourism, grocery and transport ventures, as well as a minimum of 13 to 15 Ahousaht member-owned businesses in the region. These include restaurants, a gallery, tour companies, water taxis, contractors and professional services.

A protocol agreement signed in 2002 with Pacific National Aquaculture (now Mainstream Canada) provides access to Ahousaht traditional marine territory for the siting of salmon farms in exchange for employment opportunities, tenure fees and environmental monitoring and management improvements. Opportunities for farming indigenous species (e.g., Chinook) are being examined. The aquaculture industry provides 60 to 70 jobs annually for the Nation. A very important note of merit goes to Albert Frank Sr. of Ahousaht. In 2009, he became the top performer for all of Mainstream's operations (in fish husbandry) worldwide, raising the bar and proving the worth of local knowledge in finfish aquaculture operations.

One contracting company, Cover Creek Enterprises, is privately owned by members of Ahousaht and currently employs approximately ten Ahousaht members through contracts with Iisaak Forest Resources. Iisaak Forest Resources (IFR) is a forestry company purchased in recent years by a group of nations in the Clayoquot Sound area. Formerly, they were known as the 'Central Region Group' of first nations; however, the structure of the Nuu-chah-nulth has changed from the three regional groups into one large group again. Government transfers make up 24 percent of total income for persons 15 years and over (contrasted against 13 percent in Ucluelet and eight percent in Tofino).

In 2003-04 Weyerhauser transferred two parcels of land adjacent to the existing reserve for community expansion. Plans are underway for a five-year development on District Lot 363 and 363A. The new development is designed to include approximately 200 new homes, an artist's village, cultural centre, new high school and economic development facilities.

== Community opportunities ==
Despite census figures of 13 to 14 percent unemployment, locals report much higher rates. Chronically high unemployment and the large young population about to or recently entered into the workforce create significant pressure for job creation, education and training. Of residents 15 years and over 19 percent have less than a Grade 9 education, 56 percent Grade 9–13, 19 percent trade or other non-university and 6 percent university. Social and health issues continue to provide significant challenges for this remote community and impact work-readiness.

There are also several problems with community infrastructure. Housing shortage is a significant issue and a recent study indicated there are 136 dwellings in moderate to poor condition. Further, almost half of the existing reserve (I.R15) is inaccessible to housing or other social development due to poor initial planning of the infrastructure layout. The community's dumpsite is just above the middle marker of the reserve, and makes expansion of housing into the northern portion of the reserve impossible (due to health and safety regulations). Solid and sewage waste management is insufficient and the power supply via underwater lines is projected to last for another five to ten years.

Recently, Ahousaht challenged the ownership of land by the Catholic Church to the land that had housed Kakawis Family Development Centre. This land had served as a treatment centre for many people, including members of Ahousaht; now, however, it is no longer used for such work. As such, the Ahousaht do not wish to see this land transferred into other private hands, as this land was never seceded to the church, or to the government.

== See also ==
- Ahousat, British Columbia
- Nuu-chah-nulth
- Nuu-chah-nulth language
