= Sulphur Passage Provincial Park =

Provincial park in British Columbia, Canada

- IUCN category II (national park)
- Location within Vancouver Island Location within British Columbia
- Interactive map of Sulphur Passage Provincial Park
- Location: Clayoquot Sound, British Columbia, Canada
- Coordinates: 49°24′44″N 126°05′50″W
- Area: 2,232 ha (8.62 sq mi)
- Established: July 12, 1995
- Governing body: BC Parks

Sulphur Passage Provincial Park is a provincial park in British Columbia, Canada, located in the central part of the Clayoquot Sound region of the West Coast of Vancouver Island, British Columbia, Canada. It is located around Obstruction Island to the northeast of Flores Island. The eponymous Sulphur Passage is located on the east side Obstruction Island.

== See also ==
- Clayoquot Sound Biosphere Reserve
