= Ahousat =

Nuu-chah-nulth settlement on Flores Island

Coordinates: 49°17′00″N 126°4′00″W

Ahousaht, also spelled Ahousat (/əˈhaʊsɑːt/ or /əˈhuːzæt/), is the principal settlement on Flores Island, in British Columbia, Canada. Accessible only by water or air, Ahousaht is a small community predominantly composed of Nuu-chah-nulth First Nation people.

The settlement is named for the subgroup of the Nuu-chah-nulth people known as Ahousaht First Nation. Ahousaht First Nation combines the Ahousaht, Manhousaht and Keltsmaht under one administration. The other main settlement of Ahousaht First Nation is at Marktosis.
