= Marktosis =

Human settlement in British Columbia, Canada

Coordinates: 49°17′00″N 126°03′00″W

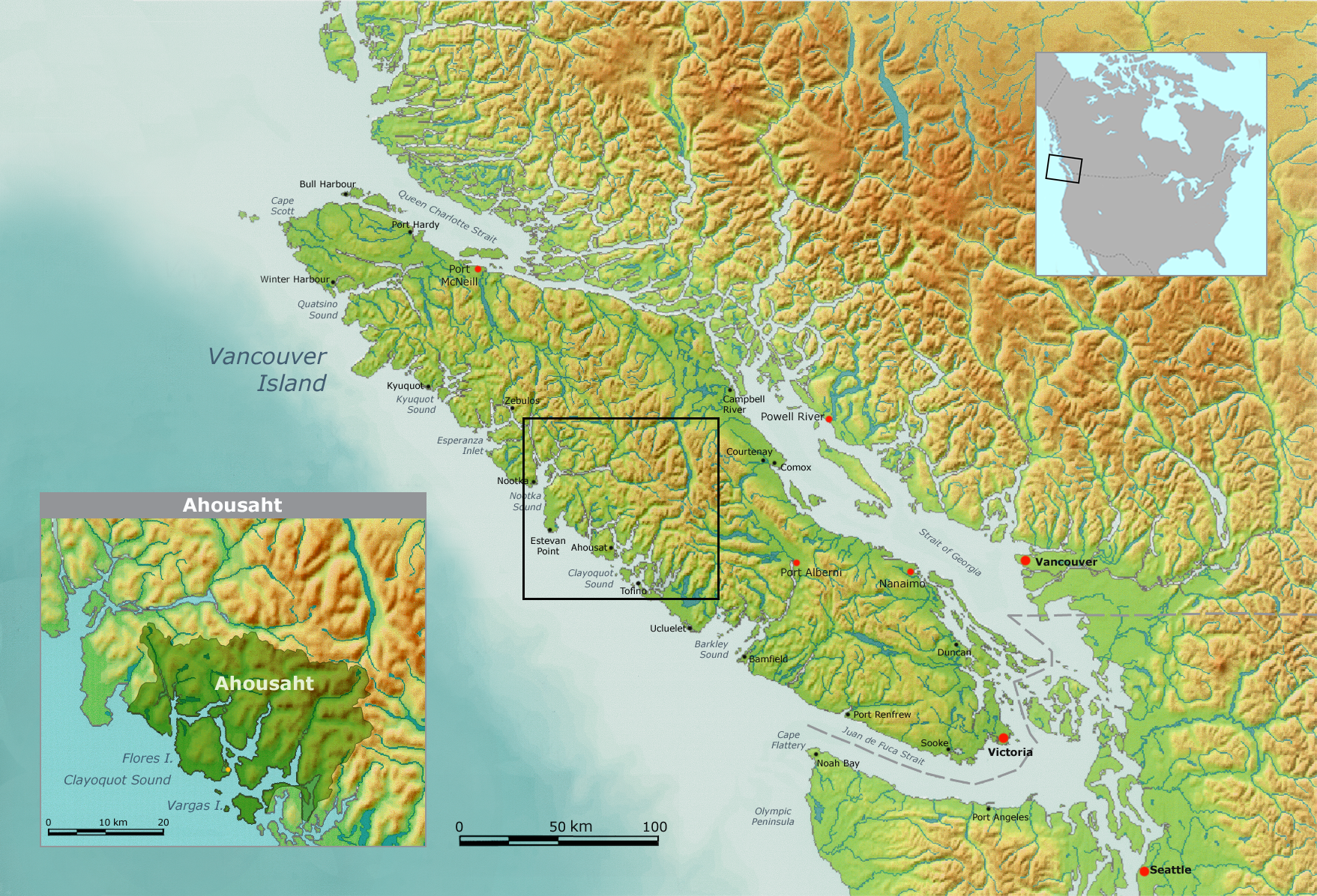

Marktosis, also spelled Maaqtusiis in the Nuu-chah-nulth language, is one of the principal settlements of Ahousaht First Nation, located off the west coast of Vancouver Island in British Columbia, Canada, just southeast of the Hesquiat Peninsula on Flores Island. Accessible only by water or air, Marktosis is a small community predominantly composed of First Nations people from the Nuu-chah-nulth nation. Marktosis has approximately 900 residents.

Marktosis Indian Reserve No. 15 was established around the site of the community and has 622 individuals living on the reserve in 2016.

== Geography ==
In the neighbourhood is the Clayoquot Sound Biosphere Reserve.

The nearby communities include:

- Ahousat
- Opitsaht
- Tofino
- Ucluelet
- Yuquot

== See also ==
- Kingfisher
