= Sydney Inlet Provincial Park =

Provincial park in British Columbia, Canada

- IUCN category II (national park)
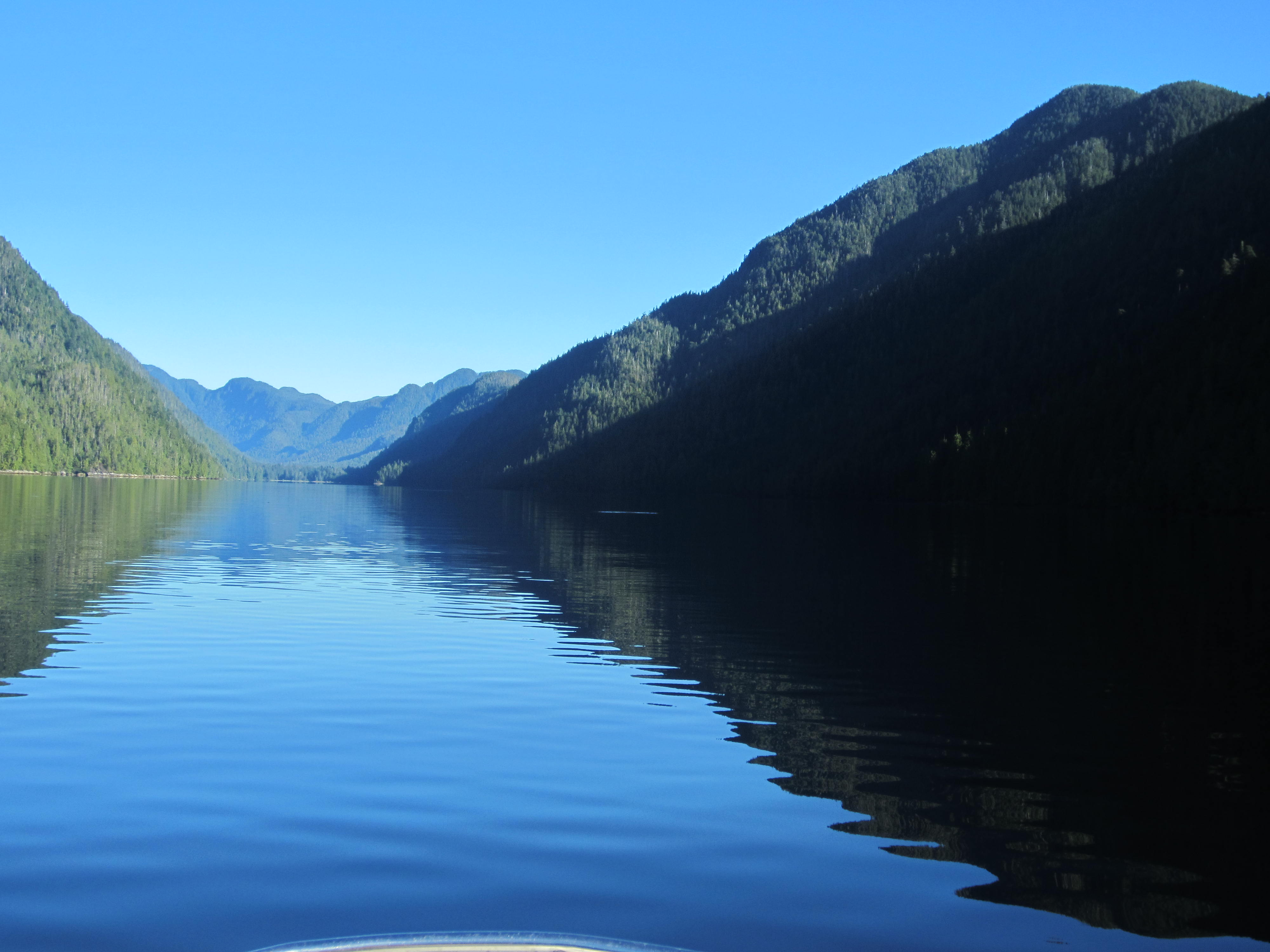
- Sydney Inlet

- Location within Vancouver Island Location within British Columbia
- Location: Clayoquot Sound, British Columbia, Canada
- Coordinates: 49°28′50″N 126°16′45″W
- Area: 2,774 ha (10.71 sq mi)
- Established: July 12, 1995
- Governing body: BC Parks

Sydney Inlet Provincial Park is a provincial park in the Clayoquot Sound region of the west coast of Vancouver Island, British Columbia, Canada, located north of the settlement of Hot Springs Cove and northwest of the resort town of Tofino. Originally named Sydney Inlet, the post office served the area from 1947 to 1948 before being renamed Hot Springs Cove. It closed in 1974.

The park contains heritage and cultural sites of the Nuu-chah-nulth peoples. Covering 2,774 hectares (6,850 acres), the park was designated for protection under the Clayoquot Land-Use Decision in 1995 and officially established through legislative amendments on July 13 of that year. Physiographically, Sydney Inlet is considered one of the best examples of a fjord on Vancouver Island. The inlet is fed by the Sydney River, which has a large population of Chinook salmon.

== See also ==
- Clayoquot Sound Biosphere Reserve
