= Alberni–Clayoquot Regional District =

Regional district in British Columbia, Canada

Coordinates: 49°15′00″N 125°20′00″W

Alberni–Clayoquot
- Regional district
- Alberni–Clayoquot Regional District
- Logo

- Location in British Columbia
- Country: Canada
- Province: British Columbia
- Administrative office location: Port Alberni

Government
  - Body: Board of directors
  - Chair: John Jack (Huu-ay-aht)
  - Vice chair: Debbie Haggard (Port Alberni)
  - Electoral areas: A; B; C; D; E; F

Area
  - Land: 6,577.08 km^{2} (2,539.42 sq mi)

Population (2021)
  - Total: 33,521
  - Density: 5.1/km^{2} (13/sq mi)
- Website: www.acrd.bc.ca

The Alberni–Clayoquot Regional District of British Columbia is located on west central Vancouver Island. Adjacent regional districts it shares borders with are the Strathcona and Comox Valley Regional Districts to the north, and the Nanaimo and Cowichan Valley Regional Districts to the east. The regional district offices are located in Port Alberni.

== Communities ==
=== Cities ===
- Port Alberni – pop. 17,678

=== Regional district electoral areas ===
- Area A (Bamfield)
  - Bamfield – pop. 179
  - Kildonan
  - Sarita
- Area B (Beaufort)
- Area C (Long Beach)
  - Estevan Point
  - Port Alberni
- Area D (Sproat Lake)
  - Great Central
  - Kleecoot
  - Sproat Lake
- Area E (Beaver Creek)
- Area F (Cherry Creek)

=== District municipalities ===
- Tofino – pop. 1,932
- Ucluelet – pop. 1,717

=== Indian Reserves ===
NB Indian Reserves are not part of municipal or regional district governance and are outside the regional district's jurisdiction, and also counted separately in the census figures. Population figures here are from the 2006 census:

- Ahahswinis IR No. 1 pop. 148
- Alberni IR No. 2 pop. 5
- Anacla IR No. 12 pop. 95
- Clakamucus IR No. 2 pop. 5
- Elhlateese IR No. 2 pop. 27
- Esowista IR No. 3 pop. 160
- Hesquiat IR No. 1 pop. 10
- Ittatsoo IR No. 1 pop. 200
- Keeshan IR No. 9 pop. 0
- Klehkoot IR No. 2 pop. 10
- Macoah IR No. 1 pop. 19
- Marktosis IR No. 15 pop. 661
- Numukamis IR No. 1 pop. 5
- Openit IR No. 27 pop. 0
- Opitsat IR No. 1 pop. 174
- Refuge Cove IR No. 6 pop. 103
- Sachsa IR No. 4 pop. 0
- Stuart Bay IR No. 6 pop. 0
- Tsahaheh IR No. 1 pop. 425

== Highways ==
Highways that run through the Alberni–Clayoquot Regional District:

- Highway 4

== Demographics ==
As a census division in the 2021 Census of Population conducted by Statistics Canada, the Alberni–Clayoquot Regional District had a population of 33,521 living in 14,615 of its 16,704 total private dwellings, a change of 8.2% from its 2016 population of 30,981. With a land area of 6,577.08 km^{2} (2,539.42 sq mi), it had a population density of 5.1/km^{2} (13.2/sq mi) in 2021.

Panethnic groups in the Alberni–Clayoquot Regional District (1991−2021)
Panethnic group	2021		2016		2011		2006		2001		1996		1991	
Panethnic group	Pop.	%	Pop.	%	Pop.	%	Pop.	%	Pop.	%	Pop.	%	Pop.	%
European (Note: Statistic includes all persons that did not make up part of a visible minority or an indigenous identity.)	24,675	75.5%	22,740	75.14%	24,145	79.46%	24,235	79.63%	24,140	80.11%	25,870	82.3%	25,140	80.89%
Indigenous	6,420	19.65%	6,035	19.94%	5,120	16.85%	4,940	16.23%	4,900	16.26%	3,690	11.74%	4,295	13.82%
South Asian	530	1.62%	570	1.88%	415	1.37%	740	2.43%	635	2.11%	1,215	3.87%	1,045	3.36%
East Asian (Note: Statistic includes total responses of "Chinese", "Korean", and "Japanese" under visible minority section on census.)	370	1.13%	445	1.47%	410	1.35%	205	0.67%	270	0.9%	395	1.26%	405	1.3%
Southeast Asian (Note: Statistic includes total responses of "Filipino" and "Southeast Asian" under visible minority section on census.)	245	0.75%	215	0.71%	100	0.33%	100	0.33%	70	0.23%	130	0.41%	70	0.23%
African	165	0.5%	90	0.3%	85	0.28%	80	0.26%	65	0.22%	75	0.24%	70	0.23%
Latin American	95	0.29%	40	0.13%	40	0.13%	65	0.21%	45	0.15%	30	0.1%	40	0.13%
Middle Eastern (Note: Statistic includes total responses of "West Asian" and "Arab" under visible minority section on census.)	50	0.15%	30	0.1%	0	0%	10	0.03%	0	0%	0	0%	15	0.05%
Other (Note: Statistic includes total responses of "Visible minority, n.i.e." and "Multiple visible minorities" under visible minority section on census.)	130	0.4%	95	0.31%	50	0.16%	60	0.2%	20	0.07%	25	0.08%	—N/a	—N/a
Total responses	32,680	97.49%	30,265	97.69%	30,385	97.82%	30,435	99.25%	30,135	99.31%	31,435	99.31%	31,080	99.54%
Total population	33,521	100%	30,981	100%	31,061	100%	30,664	100%	30,345	100%	31,652	100%	31,224	100%

- Note: Totals greater than 100% due to multiple origin responses.

== See also ==
- List of historic places in the Alberni-Clayoquot Regional District
