= Tsawwassen First Nation =

First Nation in British Columbia, Canada

Coordinates: 49°02′05″N 123°05′45″W

- Band No. 577
- sc̓əwaθən məsteyəxʷ
- Logo of the Tsawwassen First Nation

- Location of the Tsawwassen First Nation in Metro Vancouver
- People: Coast Salish
- Treaty: Tsawwassen First Nation Final Agreement
- Headquarters: Tsawwassen Lands
- Province: British Columbia

Land
- Main reserve: Tsawwassen Lands
- Land area: 7.24 km^{2} (2.80 sq mi)

Population (2024)
- On reserve: 189
- On other land: 10
- Off reserve: 214
- Total population: 413

Government
- Chief: Laura Cassidy

Tribal Council
- Naut'sa mawt Tribal Council

Website
- Tsawwassen First Nation

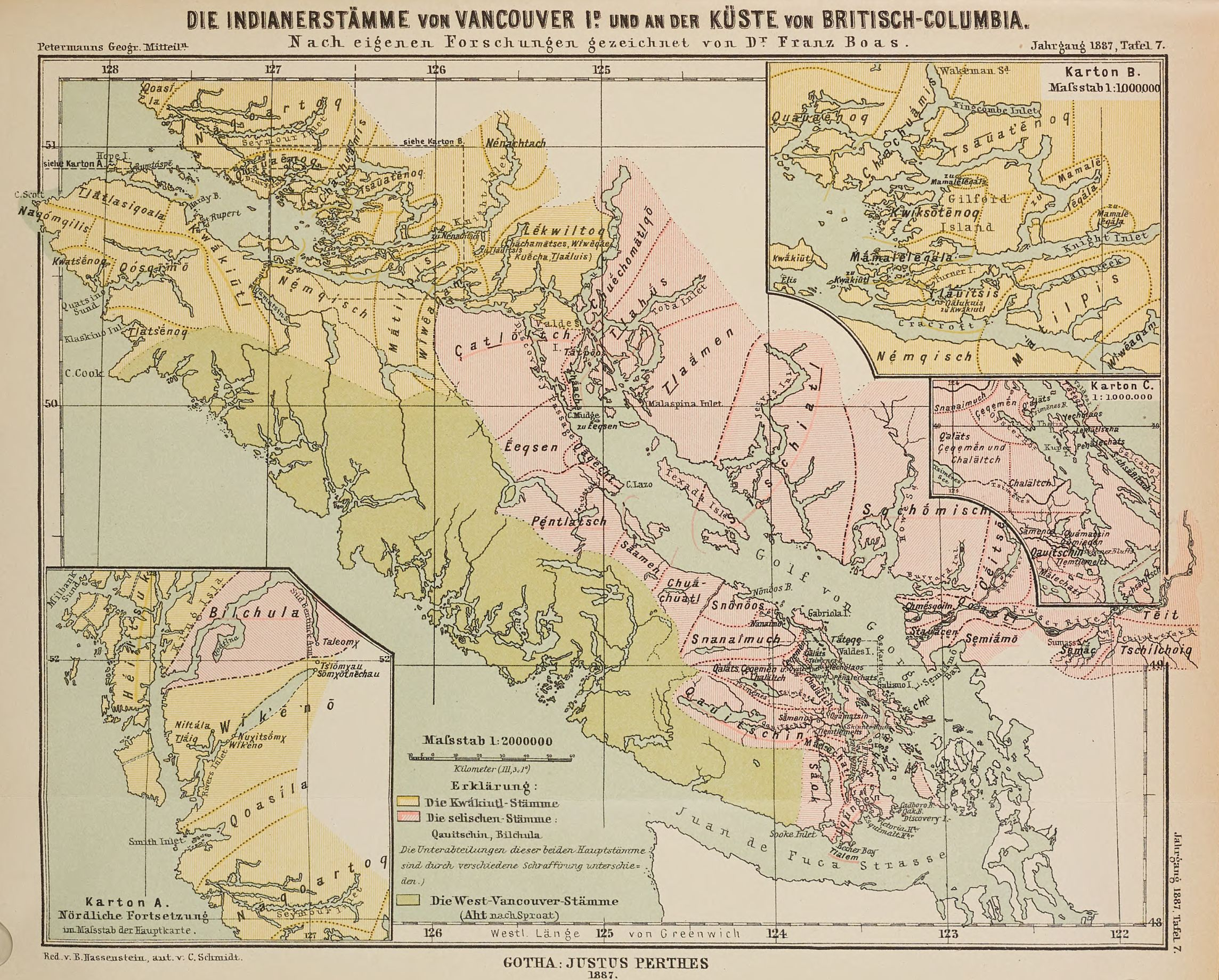
Dr. Franz Boas 1887 map showing Tsawwassen territories

Tsawwassen First Nation (Halkomelem: sc̓əwaθən məsteyəxʷ, pronounced [st͡sʼəwaθən məstejəxʷ]) is a First Nations government whose reserve lands are located in the Greater Vancouver area of the Lower Mainland of British Columbia, Canada, close to the South Arm of the Fraser River and just north of the international boundary with the United States at Point Roberts, Washington. Tsawwassen First Nation lists its membership at 413 people, nearly half of whom live on the reserve lands.

== Overview ==
Like most First Nations people of the West Coast, the Tsawwassen traditionally lived in family groups and inhabited longhouses. House posts, masks, and tools are among the ornate wooden carvings of the Tsawwassen. Traditionally, they processed cedar fibers and goat hair into dresses and headgear. Wood was also used for building material, firewood and canoes. Using tidal traps, fishing, nets and harpoons, the Tsawwassen hunt fish, especially salmon. They also harvest oysters, crabs and other sea creatures. Salmon is considered supernatural and sacred, and therefore have to be hunted and eaten in a very particular way. The remains are returned to the sea in a private ceremony. Numerous species of birds are eaten, such as ducks and loon. Land mammals such as moose, deer, black bear and beaver were traditionally hunted along with marine mammals such as seals and sea lions. Edible plants such as camas and cranberries, along with medicinal plants, were harvested, traded, and exchanged.

The traditional Tsawwassen area ranged in the north east to the area around Pitt Lake, Pitt River to Pitt Meadows down to where the water in the Fraser River flows. It included Burns Bog and parts of New Westminster. From Sea Island to Galiano Island and joined Salt Spring, Pender and Saturna Island. North Eastwards came the Point Roberts peninsula added, then the area around the Serpentine and Nicomekl River.

Today, their territory has been reduced to a relatively small semi-enclave of Delta by the shore, between the Tsawwassen ferry terminal and the Roberts Bank Superport. They also own some lands by Boundary Bay and the Fraser River, but jurisdiction remains with the city of Delta. To the south is the Canada–United States border and on the north is Canoe Pass, an arm of the Fraser River. The First Nation operates a park-and-ride for ferry customers, and also has a residential development housing non-natives called Tsatsu Shores just south of the causeway. The Tsawwassen Lands, which were extinguished as an Indian Reserve and are now fee-simple land holdings since the Tsawwassen Treaty, effective April 3, 2009, are 662 hectares (1,640 acres) in area.

Tsawwassen (Halkomelem: sc̓əwaθən) means "land facing the sea". The nearby neighbourhood of Tsawwassen and the Tsawwassen ferry terminal take their names from the First Nation.

== History ==
The oldest finds in the area of Tsawwassen First Nation settled by means of radiocarbon dated to about 2260 BC. Other sites such as Whalen Farm and Beach Grove dating back to the presence of Tsawwassen at least until the time of 400–200 BC.

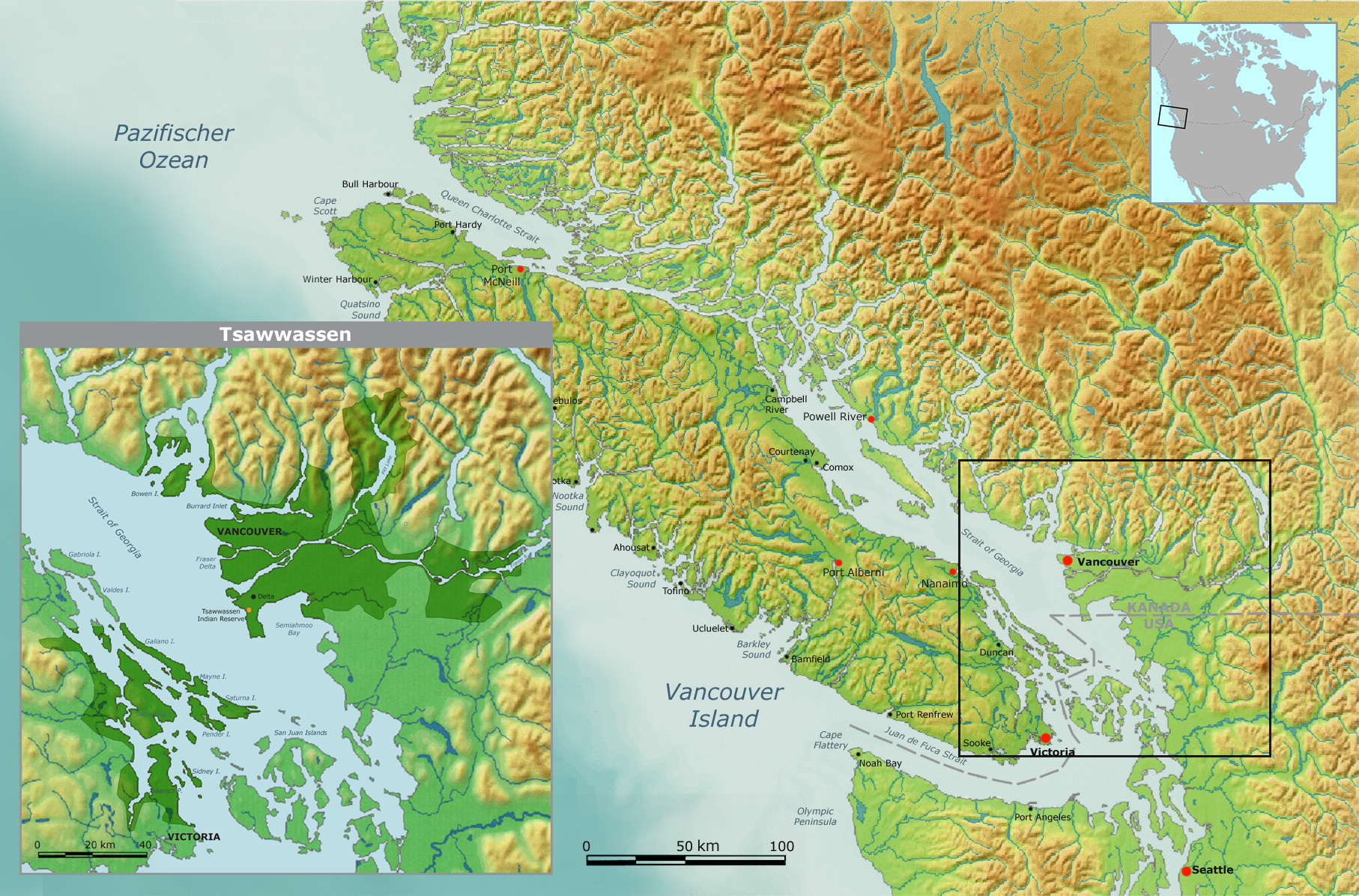
Approximation of the ancestral territory of the Tsawwassen

=== Loss of land and initial reserve ===
In 1851, the last frontier settlements in the wake of the border treaty of 1846 between the United States and Great Britain took place. A portion of the Tsawwassen Territory was now in Point Roberts in the U.S. state of Washington. In 1858 the first cross-country road was built in British Columbia from Tsawwassen Beach to Fort Langley. In 1859, it was followed by the first inner-city street the "North Road" between Burnaby and Coquitlam. In 1871, a tiny reserve was assigned to the Tsawwassen peoples, which was enlarged in 1874 to 200 hectares (490 acres). Today, it covers 290 hectares (717 acres). In 1914, chief Harry Joe sent a petition to the McKenna McBride Commission, with a request for review of reservations. The petition was dismissed. Nevertheless, young Tsawwassen First Nation people joined the Canadian Military in the First and Second World Wars.

In 1958, the provincial government built the BC Ferries terminal in Tsawwassen for their ferries. For this purpose, a Tsawwassen First Nation long house was demolished. When the terminal was enlarged in 1973, 1976, and 1991, there were no consultations with the Tsawwassen peoples.

The Tsawwassen First Nation is a member government of the Naut'sa mawt Tribal Council.

=== Treaty and land claims negotiations ===
The Tsawwassen, a Coast Salish people, are one of the few British Columbia First Nations to come to the end of the British Columbia Treaty Process, the others being the Tla'amin Nation, the member nations of the Maa-nulth First Nations (consisting of the Huu-ay-aht First Nations, Kyuquot/Cheklesahht First Nation, Toquaht First Nation, Uchucklesaht First Nation, and Ucluelet First Nation). The Nisga'a also have self-government, but completed prior to the establishment of the formal BC Treaty Process. The Yale First Nation's final agreement is ratified, but has not come into effect yet. The treaty deal would have allowed for the expansion of the Roberts Bank Superport and the employment of band members in the expanded facility, but was criticized by some as a sell-out, as the negotiated settlement modified and defined TFN's Aboriginal rights. The Treaty was ratified by Tsawwassen members in July 2007 and expanded the size of the Tsawwassen reserve by 400 hectares, offered a cash settlement of $16 million and $36 million in program funding, re-established TFN's right to self-govern, and reserved a portion of the Fraser River salmon catch to the Tsawwassen. In return, the Tsawwassen would abandon other land claims and would eventually pay taxes. On April 3, 2009, after 14 years of negotiations, the Tsawwassen First Nation implemented the Final Agreement and became self-governing. In 2009, the first election of the new Legislature was called as the existing Indian Act was replaced. Tsawwassen First Nation then also became the first First Nation to become a full member of the Metro Vancouver Regional District.

In January 2012, a "mega-mall" project was approved by the Tsawwassen First Nation, with 43 percent of the eligible voters taking part. Of that 43 percent who voted, 97 percent were in favor of the project. The mall is expected to create jobs and stimulate tourism for the community. The resulting Tsawwassen Mills mall, built by Ivanhoé Cambridge, opened on October 5, 2016.

The Tsawwassen First Nation was a defendant in the Cowichan Tribes v. Canada case where the Supreme Court of British Columbia ruled (in 2025) that the Cowichan Tribes had established Aboriginal title to approximately 750 acres in the city of Richmond, an area where the Tsawwassen also claimed title.

== See also ==
- Indigenous peoples of the Pacific Northwest Coast
- Musqueam First Nation
- Kwantlen First Nation
- Lummi
- Semiahmoo First Nation
- Halkomelem (language)
- North Straits Salish
- Sto:lo
- Cowichan Tribes v. Canada
