= Nuu-chah-nulth (disambiguation) =

The Nuu-chah-nulth people are a group of First Nations peoples living on the west coast of Vancouver Island, British Columbia, Canada.

Nuu-chah-nulth may also refer to:

- Nuu-chah-nulth language
- Nuu-chah-nulth Tribal Council

== See also ==
- Ditidaht, Nitinat people
- Makah people
