= Nuu-chah-nulth Hahoulthee =

National territory of the Nuu-chah-nulth

Nuu-chah-nulth Hahoulthee nuučaan̓uuɫ ḥaḥuułi
- Pre-contact–1867
- Status: Unrecognized country
- Common languages: nuučaan̓uɫ
- Demonym: Nuu-chah-nulth-aht (nuučaan̓uuɫɁatḥ)
- History
  - Established: Pre-contact
  - Indian Act, 1876: 1867

Population
  - 1778: 30,000
  - 1911: 3,500
  - 1930: 2,000
  - 2014: 4,606
  - 2016: 4,310
- Today part of: Canada

nuučaan̓uuɫ "all along the mountains and sea"
- People: nuučaan̓ułʔatḥ (Nuu-chah-nulth-aht)
- Language: nuučaan̓uɫ (Nuu-chah-nulth)
- Country: nuučaan̓uuɫ ḥaḥuułi (Nuu-chah-nulth Hahoulthee)

Nuu-chah-nulth Hahoulthee (Nuu-chah-nulth: nuučaan̓uł ḥaḥuułi) is the homeland and collective territories (or country) of Nuu-chah-nulth nations. Located on the west coast of Vancouver Island in British Columbia, Canada, the Nuu-chah-nulth-aht (nuučaan̓uuɫɁatḥ; or Nuu-chah-nulth peoples) have continuously lived in their lands for more than 4,000 years. Prior to 2011, every Nuu-chah-nulth territory was unceded; it was only after the BC Treaty Process, which began in 1994, did five Nuu-chah-nulth nations successfully enter into treaty relationship with Canada upon the signing of the Maa-nulth Treaty, its name meaning "villages along the coast." The remaining hahoulthees remain unceded to this day.

Aside from the Pacheedaht First Nation (P̓aačiinaʔatḥ), Nuu-chah-nulth Hahoulthee(s) are governed by the Nuu-chah-nulth Tribal Council, uniting the fourteen of seventeen Nuu-chah-nulth nations. To the south are the territories of two, remaining Nuu-chah-nulth nations: ditidaqiic̓aq disib̓aʔk (Ditidaht) and qʷidiččaʔa·tx̌ (Makah) whose languages share many similarities. To the north and east are the territories of the Kwakwa̱ka̱'wakw, Kʼómoks, and the Quwʼutsun, including relatives of the Nuu-chah-nulth-aht: the Ts'uubaa-asatx.

== Etymology ==
"Nuu-chah-nulth," written as nuučaan̓uł in the language, means "all along the mountains and sea." When referring to Nuu-chah-nulth people, the -aht (-(ʔ)atḥ) ending is applied, as in Nuu-chah-nulth-aht (nuučaan̓ułʔatḥ). At its most basic, "hahoulthee" (ḥaḥuułi) means "territory" or "resources." However, the word encapsulates more than just those concepts. Indeed, "haḥuułi is a way of understanding the territory of the nuučaanuł ḥaw̓iiḥ (hereditary leaders). More than just lands and resources, haḥuułi involves a series of responsibilities and protocols for living together respectfully and abundantly."

While the word nuučaan̓uł has one accepted anglicization, that being "Nuu-chah-nulth," there seem to be a number of ways ḥaḥuułi and Nuu-chah-nulth Hahoulthee can be written and transliterated. This ranges from "Nuu-chah-nulth Ḥahuułi," to "Nuu-chah-nulth Hahuulhi," and "nuučaanuł haḥuułi."

== History ==
Like most other coastal First Nations, the Nuu-chah-nulth have strict intellectual property laws around the stewardship and sharing of cultural stories and histories. The famous anthropologist–linguist Edward Sapir stated that the Nuu-chah-nulth-aht:

...distinguish very strictly between myths proper and legends. Both are believed to be true, but the myths go back to a misty past in which the world wore a very different aspect from its familiar appearance of today. They go back to a time when animals were human beings, to be later transformed into the creatures we know, and the tribes of men had not yet settled in their historic places nor started upon their appointed tasks. The legends, on the other hand, deal with supposedly historical characters of human kind, are definitely localized, and connect directly with the tribes of today and what is of ceremonial or social importance to them. A myth, among the Nootka Indians [sic], is no one's special property. It may be told by anyone and is generally known to a large number. A legend, however, is family propery [sic]. Only those may tell it who have an inherited right to it, who trace descent, in other words, from the hero of the legend, the ancestor who has met one or more supernatural beings, has gained "power" from them, and has bequeathed to his descendants not only his "power" but a number of privileges, such as names, songs, and dances, which derive from the ancestral experiences. Thus, the legend becomes itself a formal "privilege," inheritable like all other types of privilege...

=== Ancient history ===
Nuu-chah-nulth oral history consists of stories stretching back to a time before time, or Iikhmuut, that explain the origin of the world and convey cultural lessons across generations. They include accounts of a dark era before sunlight existed, the subsequent creation of the sun, and the actions of animal relatives who helped to demonstrate to humanity how to live in balance, with these oral accounts serving as historical records that connect families to their traditional territories.

These oral accounts correspond with the archaeological record, which demonstrates continuous human occupation on the west coast of Vancouver Island for over 4,000 years. The oldest continuously occupied site is the village of Yuquot, where early deposits dating back approximately 4,300 years contain bone points, needles, sandstone abraders, and ground stone adzes. Between 2,000 and 1,500 years ago, settlement patterns shifted as populations moved from protected inner inlets to exposed outside coasts. This transition seems to have been driven by the development of specialized whale-hunting technology, with large toggling harpoons appearing in the archaeological record at Yuquot around 1,200 years ago. This maritime economy appears to have resulted in Nuu-chah-nulth-aht expanding laterally along the windward coast, establishing permanent outside coastal settlements southward into Barkley Sound and northwest Washington.

=== Pre-contact ===
Prior to European invasion, diverse political systems co-existed across Nuu-chah-nulth Hahoulthee, ranging from small sovereign local groups to regional confederacies and family oligarchies. In regions like the inlets of Mowachaht Sound, many of these autonomous local groups typically resided in year-round villages situated at the mouths of salmon-spawning streams, which they exclusively controlled. These localized polities were led by hereditary chiefs (ḥaw̓iiḥ; singular: ḥaw̓ił) who held ancestral responsibilities for the care and security of their citizens (musčim) and their traditional territories.

In other parts of the Hahoulthee, more aggregated political alliances emerged in the late pre-contact era. Ranked regional confederacies developed in Kyuquot Sound and western Mowachaht Sound, where formerly independent groups shared hierarchies of chiefs. Conversely, a highly centralized family oligarchy developed in southern Clayoquot Sound, where a dominant lineage seized control of outer coast whaling stations. In Barkley Sound, oral histories and archaeological evidence record a volatile pre-contact period of warfare and defensive consolidation. Traditional accounts identify the "Long Wars" as a catalyst for political amalgamation, such as the reluctant integration of the whaling čaačaaci̓iʕasʔatḥ family into the Huu-ay-aht (huuʕiiʔat) nation. Archaeological evidence indicates that these late pre-contact shifts in settlement and territory were accompanied by such conflict, as shown by the appearance of defensive ditch and fort sites constructed on the outer coasts around 700 years ago.

== Economy ==
Historically, Nuu-chah-nulth nations were whaling peoples. Like other coastal nations, the wealth accumulated in harvests would be distributed during potlatches (Nuu-chah-nulth: paɬaˑč; the root of the English word "potlatch"). As such, the potlatch ban had disastrous effects of the Nuu-chah-nulth economy. Prior to the ban, and according to early European observations, the Nuu-chah-nulth-aht were one of the wealthiest people in the world.

== Geography ==
The various Nuu-chah-nulth hahoulthees all lie along western Vancouver Island in British Columbia, Canada. Separated from the British Columbian mainland by a number of straits, the southern two forming the Salish Sea, named for the neighbouring Coast Salish peoples. On land, most of the hahoulthees are bounded by the Vancouver Island Ranges which runs the length of the island, resulting in the more wet and rugged conditions of these coastal territories.

=== Climate ===
The climate of Nuu-chah-nulth Hahoulthee remains quite temperate, with temperatures in January being usually above 0 °C (32 °F), and the warmest summer days having a usual maximum of 28–33 °C (82–91 °F). Due to the vast amount of precipitation from the Pacific Ocean, Nuu-chah-nulth Hahoulthee is one of the wettest places on Turtle Island (in North America) with an average annual precipitation reaching 6,650 millimetres (262 inches) at Hucuktlis Lake.

== See also ==
- Nuu-chah-nulth people
- Nuu-chah-nulth Tribal Council
- Nuu-chah-nulth language
  - Nuu-chah-nulth alphabet
  - Nootka Jargon, a Nuu-chah-nulth-based predecessor of Chinook Jargon
