= Yuułuʔiłʔatḥ First Nation =

First Nation in British Columbia

Yuułuʔiłʔatḥ Ucluelet First Nation
- Modern Treaty Government
- Flag Seal

- Treaty Settlement Lands in the Ucluelet Area

- Treaty Settlement Lands in the Effingham and Nahmint Areas
- Constitution: April 1, 2011; 15 years ago
- Capital: Hitacu

Government
  - President: Charles McCarthy
  - Legislature: Yuułuʔiłʔatḥ Legislature

Population (2019)
  - Total: 700
- Demonym: Yuułuʔiłʔatḥ
- Time zone: UTC−08:00 (PST)
- Website: ufn.ca

- People: Yuułuʔiłʔatḥ
- Language: Nuučaan̓uɫ
- Country: Yuułuʔiłʔatḥ Ḥahuułi

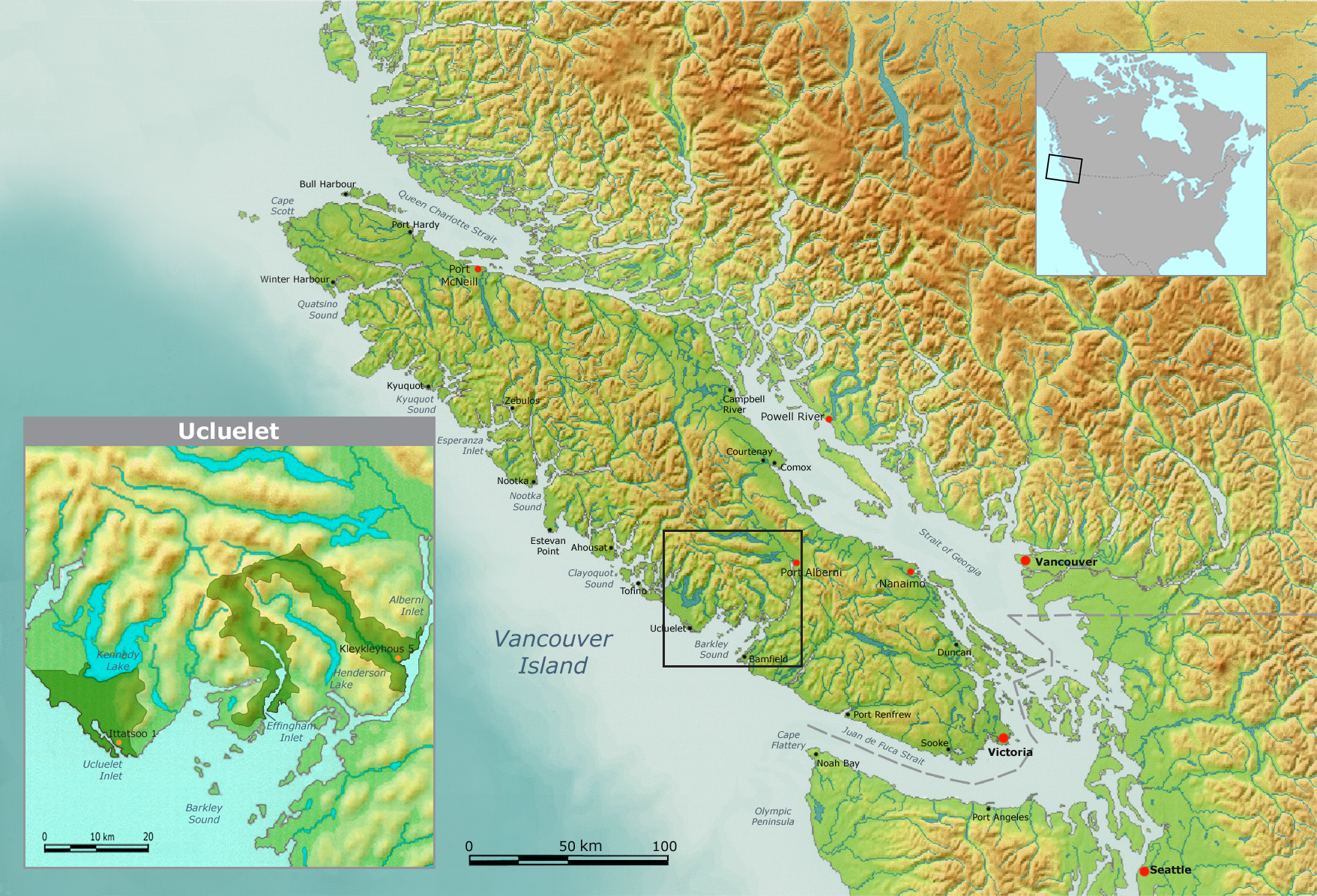
Yuułuʔiłʔatḥ Maa-nulth Area (Traditional Territory)

The Yuułuʔiłʔatḥ First Nation (Nuu-chah-nulth pronunciation: [juːɬuʔiɬʔatħ]) or Ucluelet First Nation is the modern treaty government of the Yuułuʔiłʔatḥ in the Canadian province of British Columbia (located on the west coast of Vancouver Island on the northwest side of Barkley Sound).

== History ==
Yuułuʔiłʔatḥ have lived on the west coast of Vancouver Island for thousands of years. Today’s nation comprises the descendants from the families that in the past occupied 9 different villages in the Barkley Sound area: hitaču, ƛakmaqis, ʔuuc, k̓ʷinaqułtḥ, namint, yuułuʔił, w̓aayi, huʔuł, and kʷisitis. Each of the villages historically had one longhouse for summer and winter usage.

Resource harvesting across Yuułuʔiłʔatḥ territory followed a seasonal round. Yuułuʔiłʔatḥ were fishers and whalers, with salmon being the most sustainable resource. Large quantities would be harvested in the fall and then stored throughout the winter months. The food resources spread across Yuułuʔiłʔatḥ territory were diverse, including salmon and salmon roe, herring and herring roe, cod, halibut, sardines, seals, sea lions, whales, sea urchin, crab, clams, mussels, oysters, deer, bear, elk, wild plants and roots. As with salmon, many of these foods were preserved by way of drying and smoking.

The earliest contact Yuułuʔiłʔatḥ had with Europeans was in the 1770s, as fur traders entered the region. The changing political and economic dynamics in the region dramatically shifted the composition of Yuułuʔiłʔatḥ, with the nation becoming more consolidated through the amalgamation of the various independent villages that comprised the nation. In the mid to late 1800s, Yuułuʔiłʔatḥ territory expanded through warfare in north eastern Barkley Sound, bringing the Nahmint and Effingham river valleys under its jurisdiction (where much of these territories remain today). The Nahmint River in particular became valuable as Yuułuʔiłʔatḥ's major salmon source.

With the imposition of the Indian Act, Yuułuʔiłʔatḥ experienced displacement into reserves and the dispossession of their territory and resources. Yuułuʔiłʔatḥ also experienced the residential school system, along with individuals from the other Nuu-Chah-Nulth nations. In 1958 the Nuu-chah-nulth Tribal Council was formed, which provided a variety of services to the Nuu-Chah-Nulth nations, including Yuułuʔiłʔatḥ. Yuułuʔiłʔatḥ remained under the Indian Act until 2011, when the Maa-nulth Treaty came into effect.

Yuułuʔiłʔatḥ, along with the Toquaht Nation, Ka:'yu:'k't'h'/Che:k'tles7et'h' First Nations, Huu-ay-aht First Nation and the Uchucklesaht Tribe Government, is party to the Maa-nulth Treaty with the crown in right of Canada and British Columbia. The Treaty recognizes Yuułuʔiłʔatḥ ownership of over 5,000 hectares of land within its traditional territory and provides for extensive law-making authority for the Yuułuʔiłʔatḥ Government in a wide range of areas, including land management, citizenship, resource harvesting, taxation and culture and heritage.

== Demographics ==
There are approximately 700 Yuułuʔiłʔatḥ citizens, with approximately 275 people residing on Yuułuʔiłʔatḥ treaty settlement lands in the community of Hitacu. Major population centres for Yuułuʔiłʔatḥ citizens include Hitacu, Ucluelet, Port Alberni, Nanaimo, Campbell River, Victoria and Vancouver. Citizens also reside elsewhere across Canada and the United States.

Yuułuʔiłʔatḥ citizenship and enrolment are both regulated by the Yuułuʔiłʔatḥ Citizenship Act and the Maa-nulth Treaty, and are distinct and separate from Indian Status. In both cases, entitlement operates on the basis of lineal descent from a Yuułuʔiłʔatḥ citizen or enrollee, either biologically or through adoption, and naturalization, under limited circumstances.

== Government ==
Structure

The Yuułuʔiłʔatḥ Government has three branches of government, comprising the Legislative Branch, Executive Branch and the Hitacu Assembly.

The Legislative Branch is made up of the Legislature, which consists of 8 members; 6 who are elected as legislators, 1 elected president and 1 Ha'wilth chosen by the Ha'wiih (hereditary position). Each term of the Legislature runs for four years and legislators must be at least 16 years old in order to hold office. In addition to the individuals who sit on the Legislature, a Chairperson who is not a legislator is selected by the Legislature at the start of each term to chair meetings and the Ha'wiih Advisory Council exists in order to determine the Ha'wilth. The Legislature's primary responsibility is to enact legislation, which is achieved by a majority vote of a quorum of the Legislature.

The Executive Branch is made up of the President and those members of the Legislature who are designated by a majority of a quorum of the Legislature to hold a specific portfolio. The President serves as the primary representative of the Yuułuʔiłʔatḥ Government and serves as its chief executive.

The Hitacu Assembly serves as an advisory body and consists of any citizens at least 16 years old who may vote on resolutions at the Assembly.

Legislature History

2023-2027
Elected Office	Name	Executive Portfolio	Notes
President	Charles McCarthy	Lands and Resources	
Member of the Executive	Levana Mastrangelo	Assets Management	
Member of the Executive	Asya Touchie	Culture Language & Heritage	
Member of the Executive	Gert Touchie	Community Services	
Member of the Executive	Lorri Touchie	Finance	
Member of Legislature	Kirk McCarthy		
Member of Legislature	Geraldine Touchie		

2019-2023
Elected Office	Name	Executive Portfolio	Notes
President	Charles McCarthy		
Member of the Executive	Alan McCarthy	Lands and Resources	
Member of the Executive	Richard Mundy Jr.	Finance	
Member of the Executive	Jeneva Touchie	Culture & Heritage	
Member of the Executive	Jenny Touchie	Assets Management	
Member of the Legislature	Lorri Touchie	Community Services	
Member of the Legislature	Joyce Patrick		Died Spring 2020
Member of the Legislature	Kimberly Touchie		Elected in By-Election Fall 2020 Resigned in Spring 2022
Member of the Legislature	Asya Touchie		Elected in By-Election Summer 2022

2015-2019
Elected Office	Name	Executive Portfolio	Notes
President	Les Doiron		
Member of the Executive	Alan McCarthy	Lands and Resources	
Member of the Executive	Richard Mundy Jr.	Finance	
Member of the Executive	Gordon Taylor Jr.	Assets Management	
Member of the Executive	Jeneva Touchie	Community Services	
Member of the Legislature	Larry Baird		Elected in By-Election Fall 2018
Member of the Legislature	Melody Charlie		
Member of the Legislature	Jordan Touchie		Resigned Fall 2018

2011-2015
Elected Office	Name	Executive Portfolio	Notes
President	Charles McCarthy		
Member of the Executive	Larry Baird	Assets Management	
Member of the Executive	Alan McCarthy	Lands and Resources	
Member of the Executive	Geraldine Touchie	Community Services	
Member of the Executive	Rose Touchie	Finance	
Member of the Legislature	Art Cootes		Died Fall 2013
Member of the Legislature	Spencer Touchie		Elected in By-Election Spring 2014
Member of the Legislature	Tad Williams		

== Sources ==
- "Nuu-chah-nulth Central Region Governance Structures". Ecotrust Canada. September 2008. Archived from the original on 2008-09-18.
