= Pachena Bay =

Small bay on Vancouver island

- Vancouver Island
- Location: British Columbia, Canada
- Coordinates: 48.7770°N 125.1295°W
- Ocean/sea sources: Pacific Ocean
- Basin countries: Canada
- Max. length: 3.29 km (2.04 mi)
- Max. width: 1.27 km (0.79 mi)
- Surface area: 4.9 km^{2} (1.9 mi^{2})
- Average depth: 7 m (23 ft)
- Max. depth: 16.6 m (54 ft)
- Settlements: Huu-ay-aht First Nations

Pachena Bay is located 13 km (8.1 mi) south of Bamfield in Pacific Rim National Park at the southern end of Vancouver Island, British Columbia, Canada. It was the location of a First Nation's village that was destroyed by a tsunami in 1700.

== Origin of name ==
"This word is derived from the Nitinaht Indian name for the site of Port Renfrew, but by mistake, the anglicized name Pachena was applied to a point further up the coast that had a nearly identical configuration. Pachena in its original form means either 'seafoam' or 'foam on the rocks.'

Pachena Bay adopted in the 5th Report of the Geographic Board of Canada, 30 June 1904, as labelled on British Admiralty Chart 592, 1861 et seq, and on John Buttle's "Map of the Country between Barclay Sound & Nanaimo" by the Vancouver Island Exploring Expedition, 1864 (plan 2T67).

The Huu-ay-aht (Ohiaht) First Nation live here; they call this bay "Anacla."

== Huu-ay-aht First Nations ==
Pachena Bay is home to the Huu-ay-aht First Nations village of Anacla, "which aboriginal oral history says was devastated when an ancient earthquake convulsed the West Coast of North America."

The Huu-ay-aht First Nations is a First Nations band government based on Pachena Bay about 300 km (190 mi) northwest of Victoria, British Columbia on the west coast of Vancouver Island in British Columbia, Canada. The HFN is a member of the Nuu-chah-nulth Tribal Council and is a member of the Maa-nulth Treaty Society.

== Cascadia earthquake ==
On 26 January 1700, an earthquake, one of the largest earthquakes on record, ruptured the Cascadia subduction zone offshore from Vancouver Island to northern California, creating a tsunami that wiped out the village of Pachena Bay leaving no survivors.

"First Nations from Vancouver Island to Northern California describe the earthquake and tsunami in similar legends and artwork involving a life-and-death struggle between a thunderbird and a whale that caused the earth to shake violently and the seas to wash away their people and homes...[T]he ancient quake and tsunami devastated the western shores of Vancouver Island and the eastern coast of Japan.

— Meissner 2015

An estimate of how many generations had passed since the event — which can be traced back to a date range in the late 1600s or early 1700s, or which concur with the event's timing in other ways help pinpoint the timing. The Huu-ay-aht legend of a large earthquake and ocean wave devastating their settlements at Pachena Bay, for instance, speaks of the event taking place on a winter evening shortly after the village's residents had gone to sleep. Masit was the only community on Pachina Bay not to have been wiped out, as it sat on a mountainside approximately 75 feet (23 m) above sea level. Nobody else from Pachina Bay survived the event — Anacla aq sop, a young woman who happened to be staying at Kiix?in on the more tsunami-sheltered Barkley Sound at the time of the event, came to be known as the last living member of her community.

Although residents still live primarily in lower-lying areas, they are evacuated to the administration building when a tsunami warning is issued; this is an interim step toward a longer-term plan which will eventually see the residents relocated to higher ground as well.

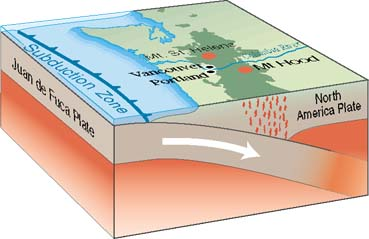
Cascadia subduction zone, Vancouver Island

In 1996, a team of researchers linked the orphaned 1700 tsunami in Japan with a magnitude 9 earthquake and tsunami in North America in a Trans-Pacific reunion. Scientists "dated the earthquake to the evening of January 26, 1700" and approximated its size as magnitude 9.

Tree-ring dating had securely linked the giant 1700 North American earthquake.

According to a 2005 United States Geological Survey (USGS) report,

"The 1700 Cascadia earthquake probably was such a giant. It likely broke at least 1,000 kilometres of the boundary between the subducting Juan de Fuca Plate and the overriding North America Plate—a rupture about as long as California, or about Japan's length’s main island, Honshu. On the seaward half of the rupture, the plates probably lurched past one another by about 20 meters. The magnitude was probably in the range M 8.7-9.2."

— USG nd

Before the mid-1980s, scientists were not certain that British Columbia had ever seen the kind of massive subduction earthquake that wreaks maximum havoc on land and causes tsunamis.

Fragments of wood preserved in the soil tell of coastal marshes destroyed by a tsunami. The excavation of a marsh reveals another layer of the same plant material, separated by a layer of sand. Tsunamis wash massive amounts of sand ashore, covering a marsh, which slowly builds up again. The deeper they dig, the more layers scientists find.

Thanks in part to oral and written accounts, we now know that such an earthquake took place off the coast of Vancouver Island, rupturing a subduction fault all the way to northern California. What's more, we can actually pinpoint the date, year and time: 26 January 1700, 9 p.m. Pacific Time.

These sources were key to understanding that massive subduction earthquakes have struck this coast every 250 to 850 years.

“A tsunami struck Kuwagasaki around midnight….water destroyed 13 houses outright and set off fires that destroyed 20 more,” according to one document. The tsunami also caused a shipwreck and damaged rice stores.

Using wave heights and arrival times recorded by the Japanese, tsunami scientists and seismologists worked backward, concluding that the tsunami originated with a magnitude 8.7–9.2 earthquake off the coast of Vancouver Island.

Japanese history aligns with what we now know about subduction earthquakes and stories that generations of Indigenous people on Vancouver Island have passed on through generations.

“They had practically no way or time to try to save themselves,” said one storyteller. “I think it was at nighttime that the land shook. I think a big wave smashed into the beach. The Pachena Bay people were lost.”

“It began in the middle of the night, and shaking was so severe that it made people sick,” said another storyteller. “It threw down their houses and brought great masses of rock down from the mountains.”
