= Keeshan =

Keeshan may refer to:

- Bob Keeshan (1927–2004), American television producer and actor
- Kiix-in, earlier romanized as Keeshan, the principal residence of the Huu-ay-aht (Ohiaht) group of the Nuu-chah-nulth people in Canada
