= Nuu-chah-nulth Employment and Training Program =

Training program dedicated to aboriginal peoples

The Nuu-Chah-Nulth Employment and Training Program (NETP) is a program that seeks to help all aboriginal people with education and training. The overall mission of the NETP is to increase the quality of life, self-reliance and economic prosperity of aboriginal people and organizations within the Nuu-chah-nulth Tribal Council region by supporting and empowering career and employment aspirations (NETP 2008b).

The NETP is associated with the Aboriginal Human Resources Development Strategy (AHRDS) through the British Columbia Aboriginal Human Resource Society (BCAHRS), a provincial organization that aims to develop strategies to help all First Nations people achieve their employment and career goals (BCAHRDS, 2008a). The NETP covers the West Coast area from Ditidaht First Nation in the south and First Nation communities in Port Alberni in the east to the Ka:’yu:’k’t’h’/ Che:k’tles7et’h’ First Nation in the north.

== Administration ==
NETP’s connections with larger organizations and their resources, such as North Island/ Nuu-chah-nulth Tribal Council Aboriginal Management Society (NINTCAMS) and the BCAHRDS, provide it with a much larger field of expertise and administrative capacity. NINTCAMS funds the NETP as one of ten Aboriginal Human Resources Development Societies in British Columbia and one of seven represented by the BCAHRDS (BCAHRDS, 2008b). These societies are organized and funded through federal programs administered as Human Resources Development Agreements (AHRDAs). AHRDAs are created to deliver labour market programming across Canada that is consistent with the Aboriginal Human Resources Development Strategy (AHRDS) (Service Canada, 2008). NETP programs and services include the following:

- Adult Basic Education

- Employment Counselling

- A-‘m’aa-sip (Structure of Intellect or SOI profiling and remedial solutions)

- Kuutiis (employability and skills training)

- BladeRunners (entry-level construction training and job-placement)

- Financial Assistance for Trades Training

Staff include an employment counsellor, coordinator, job coach, SOI education specialist, SOI facilitator and program advisor.

== Sources ==
Ecotrust Canada. Sharmalene Mendis-Millard, "Central Region Governance" in Daniel Arbour, Brenda Kuecks & Danielle Edwards (editors). Nuu-chah-nulth Central Region First Nations Governance Structures 2007/2008, Vancouver, September 2008.
