= Esowista Indian Reserve No. 3 =

Coordinates: 49°04′00″N 125°47′00″W

Esowista Indian Reserve No. 3, also known as Esowista 3, is an Indian reserve located on the Esowista Peninsula (which was named for it) in the Clayoquot Sound region of the west coast of Vancouver Island, British Columbia, Canada. Located at the head of Wickaninnish Bay, just east of Schooner Cove, it is part of the group of reserves under the governance of the Tla-o-qui-aht First Nations of the Nuu-chah-nulth peoples. Its population in 2006 was 160.

== Meaning of name ==
"Esowista" is a transliteration of the original Nuu-chah-nulth language word, hisaawista – "Captured by clubbing the people who lived there to death".

== See also ==
- List of Indian reserves in British Columbia
