= Tsawwassen (disambiguation) =

Tsawwassen (English: /təˈwɑːsən/; Halkomelem: sc̓əwaθən) may refer to:

- Tsawwassen, British Columbia, a neighbourhood in the city of Delta, British Columbia
- Tsawwassen First Nation, a First Nations government near the Tsawwassen neighbourhood
- Tsawwassen Lands, the First Nations reserve of the Tsawwassen First Nation
- Tsawwassen ferry terminal, the main ferry terminal for transport between Metro Vancouver and Vancouver Island
