= Deer Group Islands =

Island group in British Columbia, Canada

- Location within British Columbia Location within Canada

Geography
- Location: Pacific Ocean
- Coordinates: 48.883°N 125.140°W
- Total islands: 14

Administration
- Canada
- Province: British Columbia

The Deer Group Islands are a group of islands in Barkley Sound, British Columbia. Mostly consisting of crown land, they were occupied by the Huu-ay-aht, who moved there after abandoning Kiix-in in the 1880s or 1890s.
