= 1700 Cascadia earthquake =

Megathrust earthquake in the Pacific Northwest region

- Location within North America
- USGS-ANSS: ComCat
- Local date: January 26, 1700; 326 years ago
- Local time: circa 21:00 PST
- Magnitude: 8.7–9.2 M_{w}
- Epicenter: 45°N 125°W
- Fault: Cascadia subduction zone
- Type: Megathrust
- Tsunami: Yes
- Casualties: Many Native Americans killed or displaced by shaking or subsequent tsunami

The 1700 Cascadia earthquake occurred along the Cascadia subduction zone on January 26, 1700, with an estimated moment magnitude of 8.7–9.2. The megathrust earthquake involved the Juan de Fuca plate from mid-Vancouver Island, south along the Pacific Northwest coast as far as northern California. The plate slipped an average of 20 meters (66 feet) along a fault rupture about 1,000 kilometers (600 miles) long.

The earthquake caused a tsunami which struck the west coast of North America and the coast of Japan. Japanese tsunami records, along with reconstructions of the wave moving across the ocean, put the earthquake at about 9:00 PM Pacific Time on the evening of 26 January 1700.

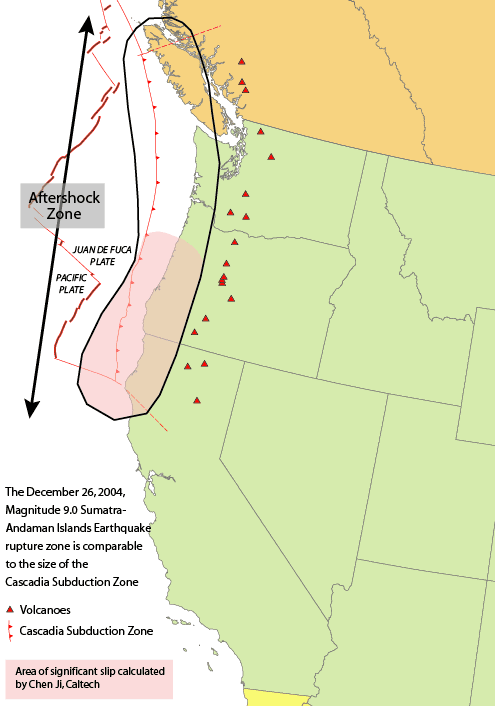
Cascadia subduction zone

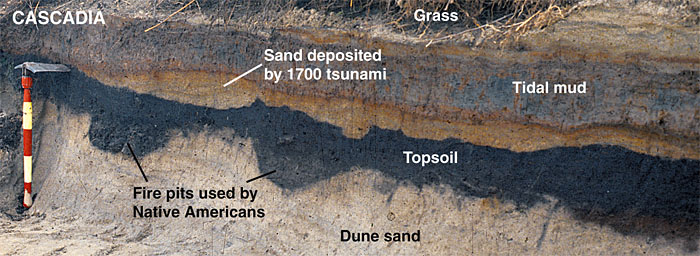
Sandsheet thought to have resulted from the tsunami caused by the 1700 earthquake, exposed on the bank of the Salmon River, Oregon

== Japanese records ==
The earthquake took place at about 21:00 PT on January 26, 1700 (NS). Although there are no written records for the region from the time, the timing of the earthquake has been inferred from Japanese records of a tsunami that does not correlate with any other Pacific Rim quake. The Japanese records exist primarily in the modern-day Iwate Prefecture, in communities such as Tsugaruishi, Miyako (Kuwagasaki) and Ōtsuchi. The fact that the waves were recorded as striking Ōtsuchi and Kuwagasaki on the same day and hour helped researchers pinpoint the estimated date, time, and place of origin of the earthquake.

According to Japanese records, destructive waves hit towns along the Pacific Coast of Japan on the 8th and 9th days of the 12th month of Genroku 12, which would be equivalent to January 27 and 28, 1700. Based on the damage reports in Japanese records, the maximum wave heights were estimated to be in the range of 2–5 meters. At Kuwagasaki, 13 houses were destroyed by flooding and 20 in a subsequent fire, representing about 10% of all buildings in the town. At Ōtsuchi, two buildings and two kilns were damaged and some fields and paddies were also flooded. At Miho, the village headman observed the waves and warned the villagers to flee to higher ground. No damage was reported there. At Nakaminato, where oceangoing ships unloaded their cargoes to smaller vessels to travel by river to Edo (now Tokyo), a ship carrying 28 metric tons of rice was unable to enter the port due to high waves. Later that evening, a storm drove it onto a rocky shore, killing two sailors and destroying the cargo. In the Tanabe area, the waves flooded wheat fields, rice paddies, and a storehouse, and ascended the moat of Tanabe Castle.

As no one in Japan had felt an earthquake before the waves struck, many writers were reluctant to call them a tsunami, with some referring to them as merely high tide or high waves. An observer at Kuwagasaki called it a tsunami while the village headman of Miho was puzzled after observing that the waves behaved like a tsunami but no earthquake had been felt in the area.

== Scientific research ==
The most important clue linking the tsunami in Japan and the earthquake in the Pacific Northwest comes from studies of tree rings (dendrochronology). These rings show that several "ghost forests" of red cedar trees in Oregon and Washington, killed by lowering of coastal forests into the tidal zone by the earthquake, have outermost growth rings that formed in 1699, the last growing season before the tsunami. This includes both inland stands of trees, such as one on the Copalis River in Washington, and pockets of tree stumps that are now under the ocean surface and become exposed only at low tide, such as the Neskowin Ghost Forest.

Sediment layers in these locations demonstrate a pattern consistent with seismic and tsunami events around this time. Core samples from the ocean floor, as well as debris samples from some earthquake-induced landslides in the Pacific Northwest, also support this timing of the event. Archaeological research in the region has uncovered evidence of several coastal villages having been flooded and abandoned around 1700.

It was once conjectured that the Cascadia earthquake may also have been linked to the Bridge of the Gods – Bonneville Slide and the Tseax Cone eruption in British Columbia, Canada. However, 21st-century investigations using radiocarbon dating and dendrochronology date the Bonneville landslide to around 1450.

== Cultural research ==
The contemporary indigenous groups of Cascadia had no known written documentation like that of the Japanese tsunami, but numerous oral traditions describing a great earthquake and inundation exist among indigenous coastal peoples from British Columbia to Northern California. These do not specify a date, and not all earthquake stories in the region can be ascribed to the 1700 quake; however, virtually all of the native peoples in the region have at least one traditional story of an event of unmatched destructive power.

Some of the stories contain temporal clues—such as a time estimate in generations since the event—which suggest a date range in the late 1600s or early 1700s, or which concur with the event's timing in other ways. For instance, the Huu-ay-aht legend of a large earthquake and ocean wave devastating their settlements at Pachena Bay places the event on a winter evening shortly after the village's residents had gone to sleep (consistent with the 9:00 PM reconstructed time). Every community on Pachena Bay was wiped out except for Masit on a mountainside 23 metres (75 ft) above sea level. The only other Panchena Bay survivor was a young woman named Anacla aq sop, who happened to be staying that day at Kiix-in, located on the less-tsunami-impacted Barkley Sound.

Kwakwakaʼwakw (Kwakiutl) stories from the north end of Vancouver Island report a nighttime earthquake that caused virtually all houses in their community to collapse; Cowichan stories from Vancouver Island's inner coast speak of a nighttime earthquake, causing a landslide that buried an entire village. Makah stories from Washington speak of a great night-time earthquake, of which the only survivors were those who immediately fled inland before the tsunami hit. The Quileute people in Washington have a story about a flood so powerful that villagers in their canoes were swept inland all the way to Hood Canal. Oral history from southern Oregon describes a large tidal wave that uprooted trees and swept away villages, with people tying their canoes to treetops and some canoes being torn loose and swept away.

Ethnographic research has focused on a common regional pattern of art and mythology depicting a great battle between a thunderbird and a whale, as well as cultural signifiers such as earthquake-inspired ritual masks and dances.

== Future threats ==
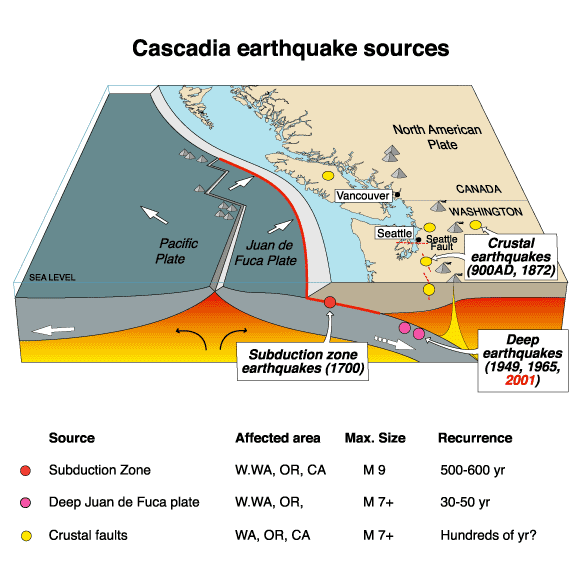
Cascadia earthquake sources

A scenario of a magnitude 9.0 earthquake on the Cascadia subduction zone by the United States Geological Survey.

The geological record reveals that great earthquakes with moment magnitude 8 or higher occur in the Cascadia subduction zone about every 500 years on average, often accompanied by tsunamis. There is evidence of at least 13 events at intervals from about 300 to 900 years with an average of 570–590 years.

As seen in the 1700 quake, the 2004 Indian Ocean earthquake, and the 2011 Tōhoku earthquake and tsunami, subduction zone earthquakes can cause large tsunamis, and many coastal areas in the region have prepared tsunami evacuation plans in anticipation of a possible future Cascadia earthquake. However, the major nearby cities, notably Seattle, Portland, Vancouver, Victoria, and Tacoma might be sheltered from the full brunt of a tsunami. These cities do have many vulnerable structures, especially bridges and unreinforced brick buildings; consequently, most of the damage to the cities would probably be from the earthquake itself. One expert asserts that buildings in Seattle are inadequate even to withstand an event of the size of the magnitude 7.9 1906 San Francisco earthquake, let alone a more powerful one.

Kenneth Murphy, who directs FEMA's Region X, the division responsible for Oregon, Washington, Idaho, and Alaska, stated, "Our operating assumption is that everything west of Interstate 5 will be toast."

Recent findings conclude that the Cascadia subduction zone is more complex and volatile than previously believed. In 2010, geologists predicted a 37% chance of a magnitude 8.2+ event within 50 years, and a 10% to 15% chance that the entire Cascadia subduction zone will rupture with a magnitude 9+ event within the same time frame. Geologists have also determined the Pacific Northwest is not prepared for such an earthquake. The tsunami produced could reach heights of 24 to 30 metres (80 to 100 ft).

A 2004 study revealed the potential for relative mean sea level rise (caused by subsidence of coastal land) along the Cascadia subduction zone. It postulated that cities on the west coast of Vancouver Island, such as Tofino and Ucluelet, are at risk for a 1-to-2-metre (3 to 7 ft) subsidence relative to mean sea level.

The confirmation of their oral traditions about a great earthquake has led many indigenous groups in the area to initiate projects to relocate their coastal communities to higher and safer ground in preparation for the predicted next earthquake. The Huu-ay-aht People have rebuilt their administration building on a high point in their territory; coastal residents are immediately evacuated to this building whenever a tsunami warning is issued, as an interim measure toward eventually relocating all residents to higher ground. The Quileute people secured a land grant from the US government in 2012 to move their settlement inland, both as protection from a future tsunami threat and because of more frequent flooding on the Quillayute River. The Shoalwater Bay Indian Tribe also sought federal funding to move their community uphill receiving a FEMA PDM grant to build the first vertical evacuation tower on their coast, completed near the Tokeland Marina in 2022.

In 2023, Washington scientists reported on a detailed study of a high-pressure and high-temperature seafloor seep, likely on the plate boundary, offshore of Oregon. The first seep found on the CSZ, it has been named 'Pythia's Oasis', and may play a role in the regulation of overpressures.

Some other subduction zones have major earthquakes every 100 to 200 years; the longer interval here may indicate unusually large stress buildup and subsequent unusually large earthquake slip.

== See also ==
- 1585 Aleutian Islands earthquake
- 1949 Queen Charlotte Islands earthquake
- Geology of the Pacific Northwest
- List of earthquakes in Canada
- List of earthquakes in the United States
- List of historical earthquakes
- List of tsunamis
- Lists of earthquakes
