= Tla-o-qui-aht First Nations =

Nuu-chah-nulth band government in British Columbia, Canada

- Band No. 660
- ƛaʔuukʷiʔatḥ
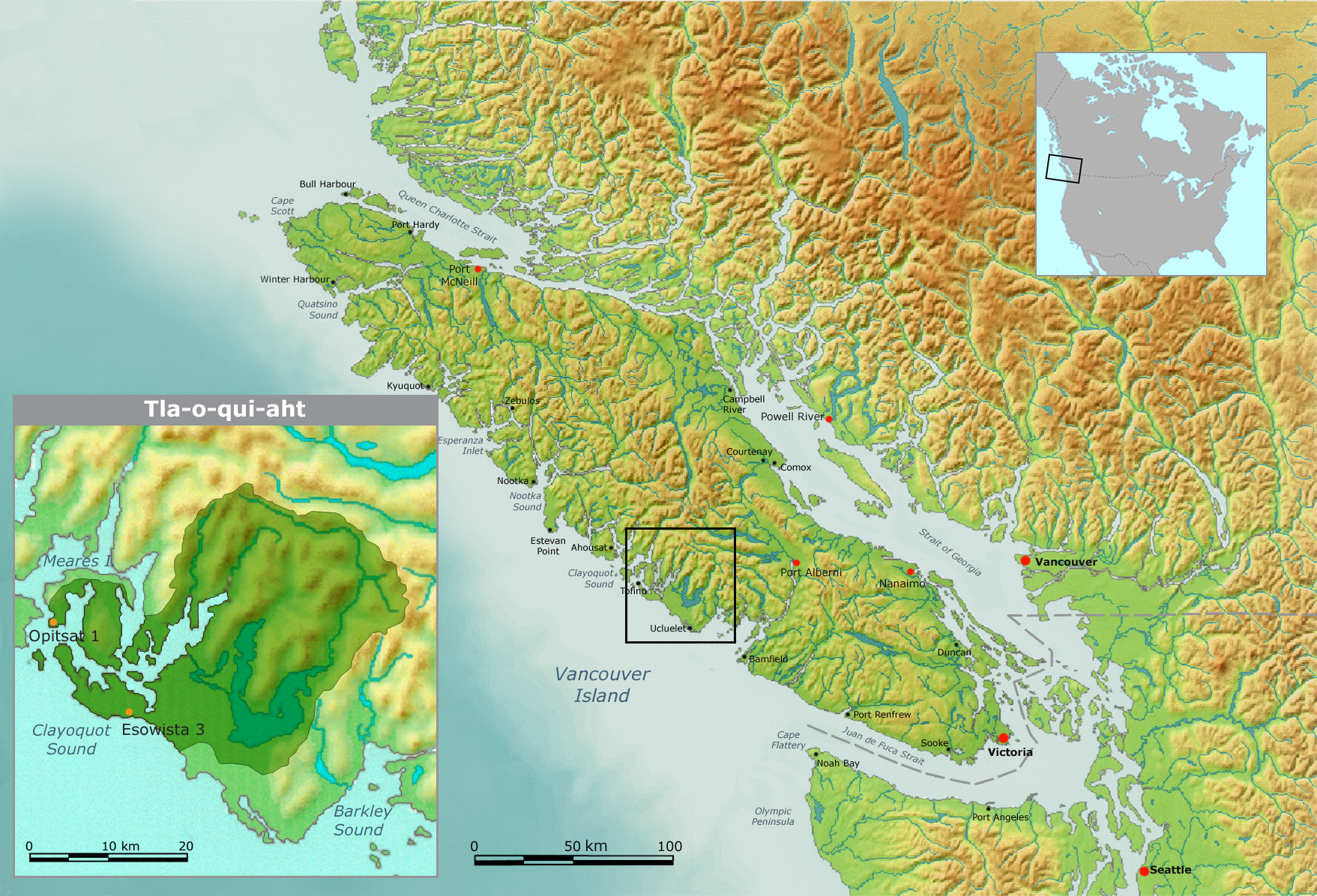
- Traditional territory of the Tla-o-qui-aht First Nations
- People: Nuu-chah-nulth
- Headquarters: Meares Island
- Province: British Columbia

Land
- Main reserve: Opitsat 1
- Reserves: List: Clayoqua 6; Echachis 2; Eelseuklis 10; Esowista 3; Ilthpaya 8; Indian Island 30; Kootowis 4; Okeamin 5; Onadsilth 9; Tin-wis 11; Winche 7
- Land area: 3.878 km^{2} (1.497 sq mi)

Population (2025)
- On reserve: 399
- On other land: 57
- Off reserve: 786
- Total population: 1242

Government
- Chief: Elmer Frank

Tribal Council
- Nuu-chah-nulth Tribal Council

Website
- www.tla-o-qui-aht.org

The Tla-o-qui-aht First Nations (Nuu-chah-nulth: ƛaʔuukʷiʔatḥ) are a Nuu-chah-nulth First Nation (band government) in Canada. They live on ten reserves along the Pacific Rim National Park Reserve on Vancouver Island, British Columbia. The band is part of the Nuu-chah-nulth Tribal Council. There were 618 people living in the Tla-o-qui-aht reserves in 1995. Their primary economic activities are fishing and tourism.

== Introduction ==
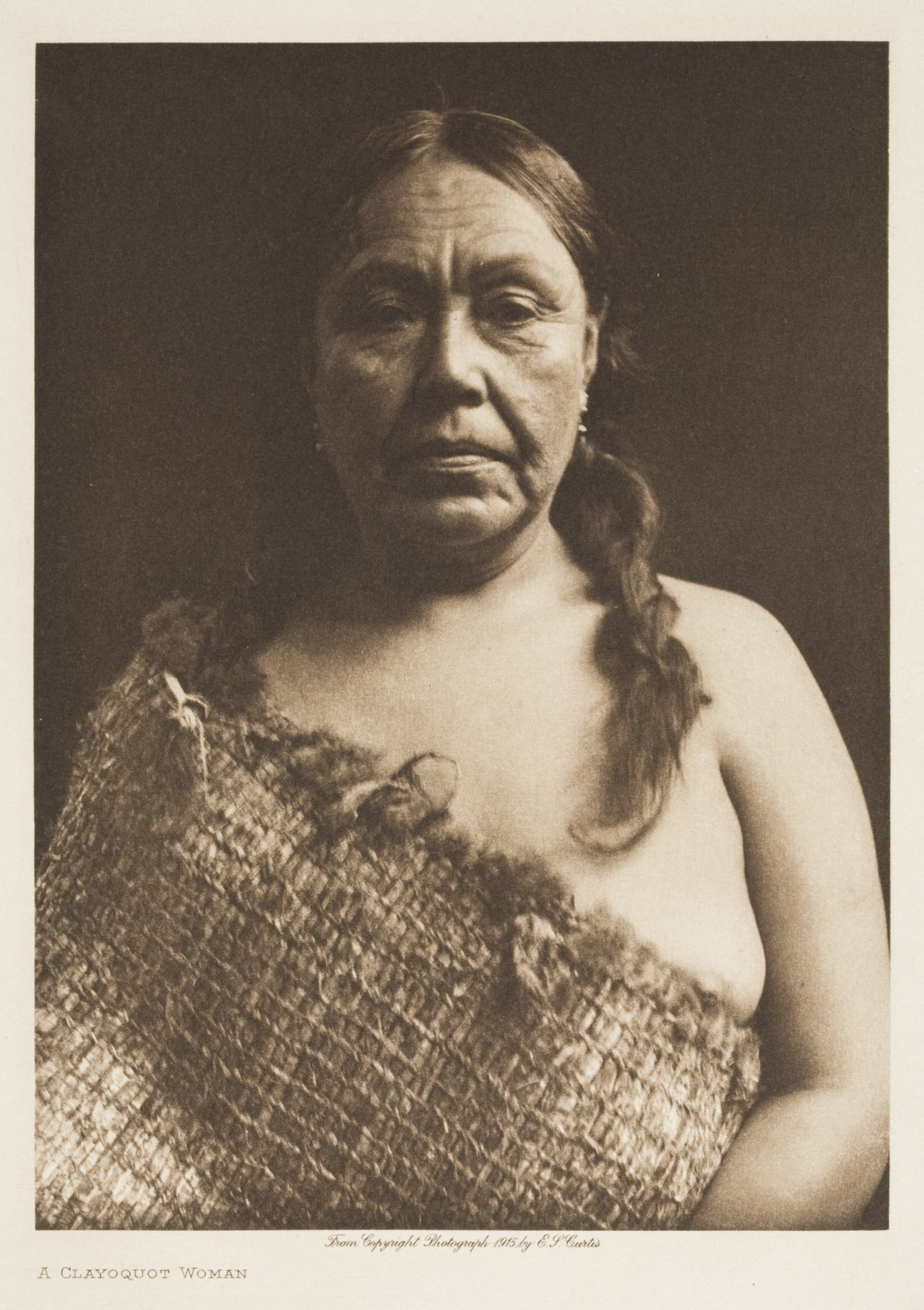
A Clayoquat woman, 1915 by Edward Sheriff Curtis

Tla-o-qui-aht, whose ancestral border is determined by the height of land, the direction of the rivers flow and as far as the eye can see on the ocean, is a confederacy of aboriginal groups who historically were independent from one another. Tla-o-qui-aht First Nations is the Indian band mandated under the federal Indian Act to deliver civil and human services to Tla-o-qui-aht. The hereditary governance systems and structures of Tla-o-qui-aht that exist today, and that have existed since time immemorial have a dynamic relationship with the Indian band administration and with the general population of Tla-o-qui-aht. The Tla-o-qui-aht First Nation resides on two separate reserves, one on Meares Island (Opitsaht) and the other at Esowista, surrounded by Pacific Rim National Park Reserve. A reserve expansion is planned for the Esowista site. The Tla-o-qui-aht First Nation (TFN) has been active in economic development. The keystone to understanding Tla-o-qui-aht history is understanding what the term Tla-o-qui-aht means. The following translation/interpretation was developed based on conversations with various Tla-o-qui-aht elders (including Mary Hayes and Dixon Sam Mitt, among others), fluent speakers, master craftsmen, seasoned politicians and those who participated in the exhaustive community consultation that was implemented by Tla-o-qui-aht during the Meares Island court case.

Tla-o-qui-aht is the confederation of historic native groups that once lived all around the lake system called Ha-ooke-min. Tla-o-qui-aht has been translated to mean "different people from a different place." However, it means much more than that: aht is a prefix for the term 'people', and tla-o-qui is a place in Clayoquot Sound presently known as Clayoqua. In this way Tla-o-qui-aht can be understood to mean the "people from a different place." Clayoquot Sound is on the western coast of Vancouver Island, north of Tofino.

In former times, the tribe's ancestors were in fact not one tribe, but many small tribes and family groups who lived all around Ha-ooke-min, which is now known as Kennedy Lake and which is where Tla-o-qui is located.

The defining event that changed the face of Tla-o-qui-aht forever is eternalized in the name of the Esowista Peninsula. The war of Esowista was a great war that Tla-o-qui-aht engaged in as a single force. The people who once lived on the peninsula from Long Beach to Tofino and further north had kept tight control of ocean resources and had made it a common practice to raid the sleepy fishing villages of Ha-ooke-min to take slaves and other commodities. In Nuu-chah-nulth, Esowista means "clubbed to death."

Tla-o-qui-aht maintained their presence in this part of the sound through to first contact with Europeans in the late 18th century. In summary, Tla-o-qui-aht, different people, are the people from Tla-o-qui; they are a confederation of many different smaller groups who once lived a very different lifestyle at Ha-ooke-min.

== Hereditary system ==
Tla-o-qui-aht is in the process of rebuilding through a combination of restoring functions and adapting to the modern political landscape in British Columbia. The Hereditary Chiefs are leading Tla-o-qui-aht through this process.

== Administration ==
Tla-o-qui-aht maintains two administration offices, one at Opitsaht and the other on the property of Tin Wis Resort in Tofino. They are currently making plans for a new administration and cultural center for the Nation.

== Appointments to other boards ==
Currently, regionally focused appointments are made by the Hereditary Chiefs. Internal appointments to band committees etc. are made by Chief to the Clayoquot Biosphere Trust Board of Directors, the Clayoquot Sound Technical Planning Committee, the Central Region Management Board and the Central Region Board.

== Business and economic development ==
The Tla-o-qui-aht (TFN) has been very active in economic development. They own and operate TinWis Resort, and have launched a tourism-booking center owned by their Economic Development Corporation. The Nation has tourism, artist/carver and small business entrepreneurs. They are involved in expanding their community housing with a reserve expansion situated adjacent to Pacific Rim Provincial Park and they are working towards the establishment of a tribal park in the Kennedy Lake watershed that will "marry" economic development and environmental protection in this part of their territory. In 2008 the Nation signed a protocol with the District of Tofino to work collaboratively towards planned development on the north end of the peninsula where several large parcels of crown land are under discussion. Like several other Nations, some TFN members (six to eight) are still involved in the fishing industry including spawn-on-kelp, and commercial salmon and halibut fishing.

=== Canoe Creek Hydro ===
Is a run-of-river hydro plant in operation since 2010. A weir on Canoe Creek diverts water through a 4 kilometres (2.5 mi) penstock dropping 474 metres (1,555 ft) to a powerhouse with a 5.5 MW Pelton wheel generator. Water is then returned to Canoe Creek, eventually flowing into the Kennedy River. It is owned by a partnership of Tla-o-qui-aht First Nations & Swiftwater Power Corp, and managed by Barkley Project Group Ltd. The powerhouse is beside the highway at 49.176894°N 125.395741°W

=== Haa-ak-suuk Creek hydro ===
This hydroelectric project was completed in 2014. It has a weir in Haa-ak-suuk Creek diverting water to a 3.6 kilometres (2.2 mi) penstock leading to a 6 MW powerhouse at 49.248074°N 125.383682°W
