= Samuel Haiyupis =

Nuu-chah-nulth carver

Samuel Haiyupis is a Nuu-chah-nulth artist from Ahousaht, British Columbia. The Canadian Museum of History has one of his carvings on display in its Grand Hall.

== Early life ==
Samuel Haiyupis is from Ahousaht, his grandmother was named Pawatsquii and his grandfather was named Haiyupis. He is Nuu-chah-nulth clan.

When Samuel Haiyupis was aged six, the family moved to Port Alberni so he could start school. At school he experienced racism.

== Career ==
Haiyupis' art has been shown in the Royal British Columbia Museum, and his 2010 carved rattle Kupkuumyis is on display in the Grand Hall of the Canadian Museum of History.

== Family life ==
Samuel Haiyupis married Beverly Jack on 5th May 1984 at the United Church in Ahousaht. They have a daughter named Geneva Faith Haiyupis.
