= Nuu-chah-nulth language =

Wakashan language of western Vancouver Island, British Columbia, Canada

Nuu-chah-nulth
- Nootka
- nuučaan̓uɫ, T̓aat̓aaqsapa
- Pronunciation: [nuːt͡ʃaːnˀuɬ]
- Native to: Canada
- Region: West coast of Vancouver Island, from Barkley Sound to Quatsino Sound, British Columbia
- Ethnicity: 7,680 Nuu-chah-nulth (2014, FPCC)
- Native speakers: L1: 280 (2021); L2: 665 (2021)
- Language family: Wakashan: Southern; Nuu-chah-nulth

Language codes
- ISO 639-3: nuk
- Glottolog: nuuc1236
- ELP: Nuuchahnulth (Nootka)
- Map of Wakashan languages

- Nootka is classified as Severely Endangered by the UNESCO Atlas of the World's Languages in Danger.

nuučaan̓uuɫ "all along the mountains and sea"
- People: nuučaan̓ułʔatḥ (Nuu-chah-nulth-aht)
- Language: nuučaan̓uɫ (Nuu-chah-nulth)
- Country: nuučaan̓uuɫ ḥaḥuułi (Nuu-chah-nulth Hahoulthee)

Nuu-chah-nulth (nuučaan̓uɫ), a.k.a. Nootka (/ˈnuːtkə/), is a Wakashan language in the Pacific Northwest of North America on the west coast of Vancouver Island, from Barkley Sound to Quatsino Sound in British Columbia by the Nuu-chah-nulth peoples. Nuu-chah-nulth is a Southern Wakashan language related to Nitinaht and Makah.

It is the first language of the indigenous peoples of the Pacific Northwest Coast to have documentary written materials describing it. In the 1780s, Captains Vancouver, Quadra, and other European explorers and traders frequented Nootka Sound and the other Nuu-chah-nulth communities, making reports of their voyages. From 1803 to 1805 John R. Jewitt, an English blacksmith, was held captive by chief Maquinna at Nootka Sound. He made an effort to learn the language, and in 1815 published a memoir with a brief glossary of its terms.

== Name ==
The provenance of the term "Nuu-chah-nulth", meaning "along the outside [of Vancouver Island]" dates from the 1970s, when the various groups of speakers of this language joined together, disliking the term "Nootka" (which means "go around" and was mistakenly understood to be the name of a place, which was actually called Yuquot). The name given by earlier sources for this language is Tahkaht; that name was used also to refer to themselves (the root aht means "people").

== Status ==
Using data from the 2021 census, Statistics Canada reported that 665 individuals could conduct a conversation in Nuu-chah-nulth. This represents a 23% increase over the 2016 census. The total included 280 speakers who reported the language as a mother tongue.

== Phonology ==
=== Consonants ===
The 35 consonants of Nuu-chah-nulth, in IPA and orthography:

Consonants
		Bilabial	Alveolar (Note: Of the alveolar consonants, nasal and laterals are apico-alveolar while the rest are denti-alveolar.)			Palatal	Velar		Uvular		Pharyn- geal	Glottal
		Bilabial	median	sibilant	lateral	Palatal	plain	labial	plain	labial	Pharyn- geal	Glottal
Plosive/ Affricate	plain	p ⟨p⟩	t ⟨t⟩	t͡s ⟨c⟩	t͡ɬ ⟨ƛ⟩	t͡ʃ ⟨č⟩	k ⟨k⟩	kʷ ⟨kʷ⟩	q ⟨q⟩	qʷ ⟨qʷ⟩		ʔ ⟨ʔ⟩
Plosive/ Affricate	ejective	pʼ ⟨p̓⟩	tʼ ⟨t̓⟩	t͡sʼ ⟨c̓⟩	t͡ɬʼ ⟨ƛ̓⟩	t͡ʃʼ ⟨č̓⟩	kʼ ⟨k̓⟩	kʷʼ ⟨k̓ʷ⟩				
Fricative				s ⟨s⟩	ɬ ⟨ł⟩	ʃ ⟨š⟩	x ⟨x⟩	xʷ ⟨xʷ⟩	χ ⟨x̣⟩	χʷ ⟨x̣ʷ⟩	ħ ⟨ḥ⟩	h ⟨h⟩
Sonorant	plain	m ⟨m⟩	n ⟨n⟩			j ⟨y⟩		w ⟨w⟩			ʕ ⟨ʕ⟩ (Note: The approximant /ʕ/ is more often epiglottal [ʡ] and functions phonologically as a stop.)	
Sonorant	glottalized (Note: Glottalized sonorants (nasals and approximants) are realized as sonorants with pre-glottalization. They are arguably conceptually the same as ejective consonants, though a preglottalized labial nasal could be analyzed as the stop–nasal sequence /ʔm/, as a nasal preceded by a creaky voiced (glottalized) vowel, or a combination of the two.)	ˀm ⟨m̓⟩	ˀn ⟨n̓⟩			ˀj ⟨y̓⟩		ˀw ⟨w̓⟩				

The pharyngeal consonants developed from mergers of uvular sounds; /ħ/ derives from a merger of /χ/ and /χʷ/ (which are now comparatively rare) while /ʕ/ came about from a merger of /qʼ/ and /qʷʼ/ (which are now absent from the language).

The alphabet is unicase and has no capital letters except when words or names are embedded in English text

=== Vowels ===
Vowels of Nuu-chah-nulth. From Carlson, Esling & Fraser (2001)

Nuu-chah-nulth vowels are influenced by surrounding consonants with certain "back" consonants conditioning lower, more back vowel allophones.

Vowels
	Front		Central		Back	
	long	short	long	short	long	short
Close	iː	i			uː	u
Mid^{1}	(ɛː)			(ə)	(ɔː)	
Open			aː	a		

The mid vowels [ɛː] and [ɔː] appear in vocative forms and in ceremonial expressions. [ə] is a possible realization of /a/ after a glottalized sonorant.

In the environment of glottalized resonants as well as ejective and pharyngeal consonants, vowels can be "laryngealized" which often means creaky voice.

In general, syllable weight determines stress placement; short vowels followed by non-glottalized consonants and long vowels are heavy. In sequences where there are no heavy syllables or only heavy syllables, the first syllable is stressed.

Nuu-chah-nulth has phonemic short and long vowels. Long vowels are written double. Traditionally, a third class of vowels, known as "variable length" vowels, is recognized. These are vowels that are long when they are found within the first two syllables of a word, and short elsewhere.

== Grammar ==
Nuu-chah nulth is a polysynthetic language with VSO word order.

A clause in Nuu-chah-nulth must consist of at least a predicate. Affixes can be appended to those clauses to signify numerous grammatical categories, such as mood, aspect or tense.

=== Aspect ===
Aspects in Nuu-chah-nulth help specify an action's extension over time and its relation to other events. Up to seven aspects can be distinguished:

Aspect	Affix
Momentaneous	–(C)iƛ, –uƛ
Inceptive	–°ačiƛ, –iičiƛ
Durative	–(ʔ)ak, –(ʔ)uk, –ḥiˑ
Continuative	–(y)aˑ
Graduative	[lengthens the stem's first vowel and shortens its second one]
Repetitive	–ː(ƛ)–ː(y)a
Iterative	R–š, –ł, –ḥ

Where each "–" signifies the root.

=== Tense ===
Tense can be marked using affixes (marked with a dash) and clitics (marked with an equal sign).

Nuu-chah-nulth distinguishes near future and general future:

General future	Near future
=ʔaqƛ, =ʔaːqƛ	–w̓itas, –w̓its

The first two markings refer to a general event that will take place in the future (similar to how the word will behaves in English) and the two other suffixes denote that something is expected to happen (compare to the English going to).

Past tense can be marked with the =mit clitic that can itself take different forms depending on the environment and speaker's dialect:

Environment	Clitic	Example (Barkley dialect)	Translation
Consonant–vowel stem	=mi(t), =nit	waa → waamit	said
Long vowel, /m/, /n/	=mi(t), =nt	saasin → saasinmit	dead hummingbird
Short vowel	=imt, =int, =mi(t), =um(t)	ciiqciiqa → ciiqciiqimt	spoke
Consonant	=it, =mi(t), =in(t)	wiikapuƛ → wiikapuƛit	passed away
=!ap	=mi(t), =in(t), =!amit	hił=!ap → hiłʔamit	hosted at
=!at	=mi(t), =in(t), =!aːnit, =!anit	waa=!at → waaʔaanit	was told

=== Mood ===
Grammatical mood in Nuu-chah-nulth lets the speaker express the attitude towards what they're saying and how did they get presented information. Nuu-chah-nulth's moods are:

Mood	Affix
Absolutive	=∅
Indicative	=maˑ
Assertive	=ʔiˑš
Indefinite relative	=(y)iː, =(y)iˑ
Definite relative	=ʔiˑtq, =ʔiˑq
Subordinate	=qaˑ
Dubitative relative	=(w)uːsi
Conditional	=quː, =quˑ
Quotative	=waˑʔiš, =weˑʔin
Inferential	=čaˑʕaš
Dubitative	=qaˑča
Purposive	=!eeʔit(a), =!aːḥi
Interrogative	=ḥaˑ, =ḥ
Imperative	=!iˑ
Future imperative	=!im, =!um
go–imperative	=čiˑ
come–imperative	=!iˑk
Article	=ʔiˑ
Quotative article	=čaˑ

Not counting the articles, all moods take person endings that indicate the subject of the clause.

== Vocabulary ==
The Nuu-chah-nulth language contributed much of the vocabulary of the Chinook Jargon. It is thought that oceanic commerce and exchanges between the Nuu-chah-nulth and other Southern Wakashan speakers with the Chinookan-speaking peoples of the lower Columbia River led to the foundations of the trade jargon that became known as Chinook. Nootkan words in Chinook Jargon include hiyu ("many"), from Nuu-chah-nulth for "ten", siah ("far"), from the Nuu-chah-nulth for "sky".

A dictionary of the language, with some 7,500 entries, was created after 15 years of research. It is based on both work with current speakers and notes from linguist Edward Sapir, taken almost a century ago. The dictionary, however, is a subject of controversy, with a number of Nuu-chah-nulth elders questioning the author's right to disclose their language.

== Dialects ==
Nuu-chah-nulth has 12 different dialects:

- Ahousaht [ʕaːħuːsʔatħ]
- Ehattesaht (aka Ehattisaht) [ʔiːħatisʔatħ]
- Hesquiat [ħiʃkʷiːʔatħ]
- Kyuquot [qaːjʼuːkʼatħ]
- Mowachaht [muwat͡ʃʼatħ]
- Nuchatlaht [nut͡ʃaːɬʔatħ]
- Ohiaht (aka Huu.ay.aht) [huːʔiːʔatħ]
- Clayoquot (aka Tla.o.qui.aht) [taʔuːkʷiʔatħ]
- Toquaht [tʼukʼʷaːʔatħ]
- Tseshaht (aka Sheshaht) [t͡ʃʼiʃaːʔatħ]
- Uchuklesaht (aka Uchucklesaht) [ħuːt͡ʃuqtisʔatħ]
- Ucluelet (aka Yuułuʔiłʔatḥ) [juːɬuʔiɬʔatħ]

== Translations of the First Nation names ==
- Nuu-Chah-Nulth – "all along the mountains and sea." Nuu-chah-nulth were formerly known as "Nootka" by colonial settlers (but they prefer not to be called that, rather Nuu-chah-nulth which better explains how each First Nation is connected to the land and the sea). Some of the names following (Ditidaht, Makah) are not part of the Nuu-chah-nulth political organization, however; all are atḥ (people). The term nuučaanułatḥ is also used, meaning "people all along the mountains and the sea."
- Ahousaht – People of an open bay/People with their backs to the mountains and lands
- Ucluelet – People with a safe landing place for canoes.
- Ehattesaht – People of a tribe with many clans
- Checkleset – People from the place where you gain strength
- Hesquiaht – People who tear with their teeth
- Kyuquot – Different people
- Mowachaht – People of the deer
- Muchalaht – People who live on the Muchalee river
- Nuchatlaht – People of a sheltered bay
- Huu-ay-aht – People who recovered
- Tseshaht – People from an island that reeks of whale remains
- Tla-o-qui-aht – People from a different place
- Toquaht – People of a narrow passage
- Uchucklesaht – People of the inside harbour
- Ditidaht – People of the forest
- Hupacasaht – People living above the water
- Quidiishdaht (Makah) – People living on the point
- Makah – People generous with food

== Translations of place names ==
Nuuchahnulth had a name for each place within their traditional territory. These are just a few still used to this day:

- hisaawista (esowista) – Esowista Peninsula and Esowista Indian Reserve No. 3; captured by clubbing the people who lived there to death.
- yuquot (Friendly Cove) – Where they get the north winds.
- nootk-sitl (Nootka) – Go around.
- maaqtusiis – Marktosis; a place across the island.
- kakawis – Fronted by a rock that looks like a container.
- Kitsuksis – Log across mouth of creek
- opitsaht – Island that the moon lands on
- pacheena – Foamy.
- tsu-ma-uss (somass) – Somass River; washing.
- tsahaheh – To go up.
- hitac`u (itatsoo) – Ucluelet Reserve.
- t’iipis – Polly’s Point.
- Tsaxana – A place close to the river.
- Cheewat – Pulling tide.

== Resources ==
A Ehattesaht iPhone app was released in January 2012. An online dictionary, phrasebook, and language learning portal is available at the First Voices Ehattesaht Nuchatlaht Community Portal.

== See also ==
- Nuu-chah-nulth alphabet
- Nuu-chah-nulth people
- Nuu-chah-nulth Tribal Council
- Nootka Jargon, a Nuu-chah-nulth-based predecessor of Chinook Jargon
- Nitinaht language
- Makah
