= Ditidaht Kids =

2021 Canadian indigenous video game

- Developer: Ditidaht Community School
- Publisher: Ditidaht Community School
- Platforms: Android, iOS
- Release: September 23, 2021

Ditidaht Kids is a Canadian mobile game developed by the language department of the Ditidaht Community School (DCS), who are members of the Ditidaht First Nation in Vancouver Island, British Columbia. The game was created to teach Ditidaht children aged 3 to 6 about their language, territory, traditions, and culture in preparation for them attending kindergarten at the DCS. Ditidaht Kids involves an interactive canoe journey through Ditidaht territory. The game was funded by the First Peoples' Cultural Council (FPCC) and the Ditidaht Community School collaborated with elder teachers, knowledge keepers, fluent speakers, historians, researchers, voice actors, songwriters, children, and parents to develop the game. Ditidaht Kids was released on September 23, 2021, and is available on Android and iOS. As of November 2021, the game has been downloaded over 2,000 times.
