= FPCC =

FPCC may refer to:

- Fair Play for Cuba Committee
- First Peoples' Cultural Council
