= Andaokut =

Native American mythological figure

Andaokut is a Native American mythological figure of the Nuu-chah-nulth people. He is a giant boy born from the tears of a woman mourning the loss of her child, which was stolen by Malahas, a cannibal. He ventures through the forest to find Malahas, slay her, and rescue the children she abducted, and brings them back to life by urinating on them.
