= Malahas =

Indigenous mythological figure

Malahas is a Native American mythological figure of the Nuu-chah-nulth people. She abducts children and brings them into the forest, as such she is known as the Woman of the Woods. Eventually she is brought down by Andaokut.

There is a similar myth about a being known as Dzunukwa told in Kwakwaka'wakw mythology.
