= Esowista Peninsula =

Peninsula in British Columbia, Canada

The Esowista Peninsula is a peninsula in the Clayoquot Sound region of the west coast of Vancouver Island, British Columbia, Canada. The name was adopted in 1934 in reference to Esowista Indian Reserve No. 3. The name originally applied to the neck of land between Templar Channel and Browning Passage, centred at 49°08′N 125°54′W to the whole neck of land from Grice Bay, Long Beach and Tofino. It was originally charted as Low Peninsula by the Royal Navy in 1860. Much of the peninsula is within the Pacific Rim National Park Reserve.

== Meaning of name ==
Esowista is a transliteration of the original Nuu-chah-nulth language word hisaawista – 'captured by clubbing the people who lived there to death'.
