= Toquaht First Nation =

Nuu-chah-nulth band government in British Columbia, Canada

Toquaht Nation Band No. 666 t̓uk̓ʷaaʔatḥ

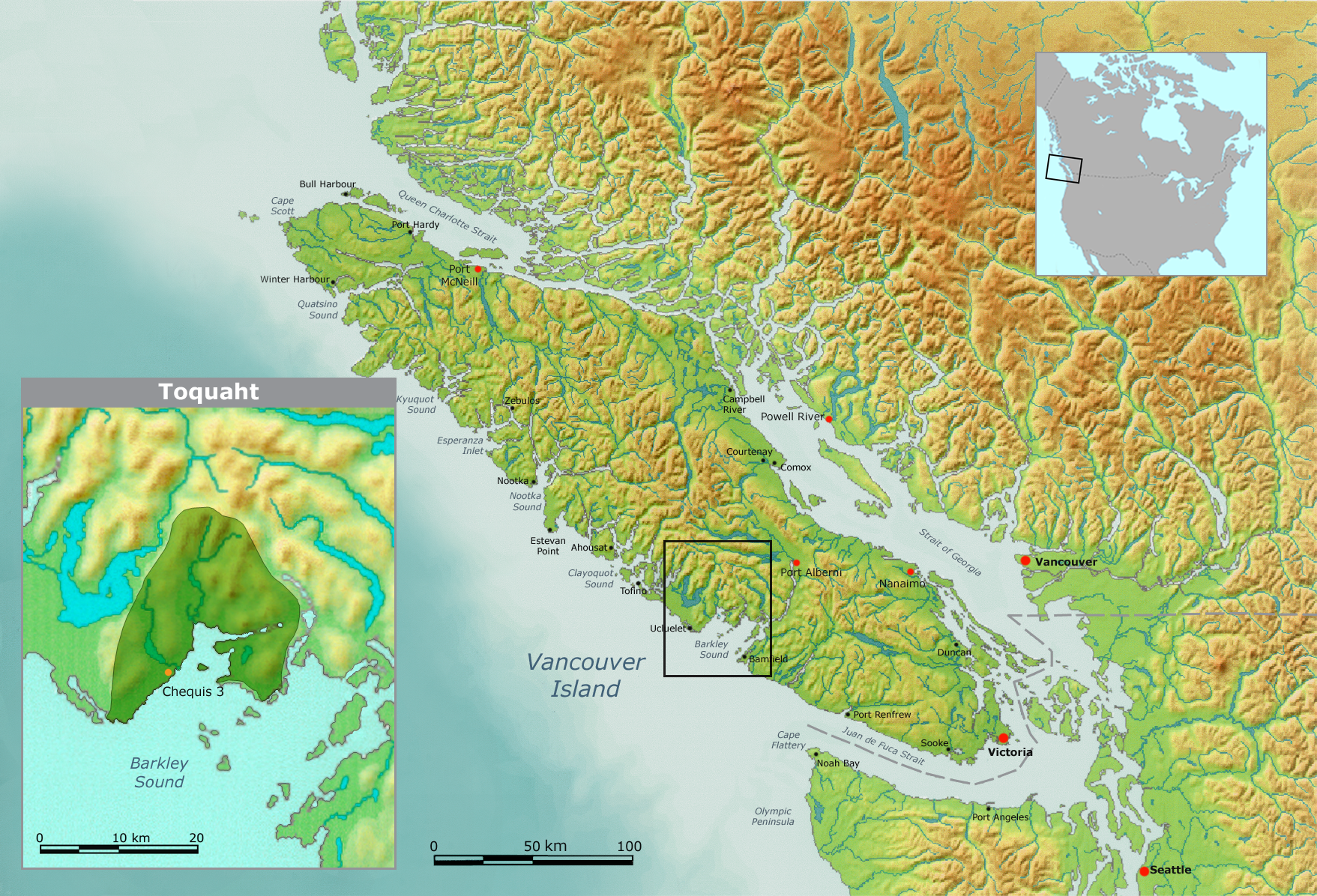
- People: Nuu-chah-nulth
- Headquarters: Ucluelet
- Province: British Columbia

Population (2025)
- On reserve: 10
- On other land: 11
- Off reserve: 137
- Total population: 158

Government
- Chief: Anne Mack (hereditary); Kevin Mack (secondary)
- Council: Kirsten Johnson; Lisa Morgan; Noah Plonka

Tribal Council
- Nuu-chah-nulth Tribal Council; Maa-nulth First Nations

Website
- toquaht.ca

The Toquaht Nation is a modern treaty government located on the west coast of Vancouver Island in British Columbia, Canada. It is a member of the Maa-nulth Treaty Society and the Nuu-chah-nulth Tribal Council.

== Introduction ==
In terms of citizenship, the Toquaht Nation is one of the smallest First Nations within the Nuu-chah-nulth Tribal Council (NTC). The Nation has about 150 citizens in total. There are roughly 20 people currently living at the main village of Macoah, which is accessible off Highway 4 on Kennedy Lake. Most remaining citizens live in Ucluelet, Port Alberni, Nanaimo and Victoria.

Despite its small size the Toquaht Nation has, within the NTC and the Central Region First Nations, engaged in active political leadership, business initiatives, cultural events, and been a proponent of the Maa-nulth First Nations Final Agreement. On April 1, 2011, the Maa-nulth First Nations Final Agreement was implemented, the second treaty to be implemented under the BC treaty process.

== Governance ==
Historically, the Toquaht Nation, like many Nuu-chah-nulth Nations, maintained a hereditary system of governance. Under the Maa-nulth First Nations Final Agreement, however, Toquaht moved towards a "hybrid" hereditary/elected system, which maintains traditional governance approaches. This hybrid model has two hereditary leaders holding permanent seats on Council, with three other Councillors elected every four years. The government structure under the Toquaht Constitution consists of a Legislative branch, an Executive branch, and a People's Assembly. The Toquaht Nation reserves the right to establish a judicial branch as well.

In January 2009, in a traditional ceremony Grand Chief Bert Mack passed on Chieftainship to Anne Mack, who succeeds him after a reign of over 50 years.

== Administration ==
The Toquaht Nation has a small administrative structure which oversees social and economic development programs, treaty implementation, and governance coordination.

== Business and Economic Development ==
The Toquaht Nation and its citizens manage or own businesses including:

- Barkley Sound Shellfish L.P.
- Toquaht Bay Marina and Campground L.P.
- Toquaht Development L.P. (sawmill)
- Toquaht Enterprises L.P. (forestry)
- Toquaht Management L.P. (asset management)

== Toquaht Lands ==
The implementation of the Maa-nulth First Nations Final Agreement freed the Toquaht Nation from the Indian Act and re-established self-governance and control over Toquaht traditional territories. Under the Maa-nulth treaty, Toquaht regained control of 1,489 hectares of land with an option to purchase 721 more hectares over 15 years. This was a significant increase to the 199 hectares of Indian Reserve lands that were held in trust for the Toquaht Nation under the Indian Act.

== See also ==
- Nuu-chah-nulth people
- Nuu-chah-nulth language

== Sources ==
Ecotrust Canada. Jackie Godfrey, "The Toquaht Nation," in Daniel Arbour, Brenda Kuecks and Danielle Edwards (editors).
