= Maa-nulth First Nations =

The Maa-nulth First Nations, also known as First Nations of Maa-nulth Treaty Society, is a First Nations Treaty Society of Nuu-chah-nulth nations on the west coast of Vancouver Island.

== Member Nations ==
- Huu-ay-aht First Nations
- Ka:'yu:'k't'h'/Che:k:tles7et'h' First Nations (formerly Kyuqout)
- Toquaht First Nation
- Uchucklesaht Tribe
- Yuułuʔiłʔatḥ (Ucluelet First Nation)

== Treaty Process ==
The Maa-nulth First Nations' Final Agreement, Stage 5 in the BC Treaty Process, was initialled on December 9, 2006, and subsequently ratified by Maa-nulth First Nations members in the summer and fall of 2007. Provincial ratification legislation was introduced in the Legislative Assembly on November 21, and received Royal Assent on November 29.

In October 2007, the ratification process was also completed and all five First Nations voted in favour of accepting the Final Agreement. Of those who voted, close to 80 per cent were in favour of the treaty. The Maa-nulth Final Agreement is the first modern-day treaty for Vancouver Island and the second under the BCTC process.
