= Uchucklesaht First Nation =

Nuu-chah-nulth band government in British Columbia, Canada

Uchucklesaht Tribe Band No. 667
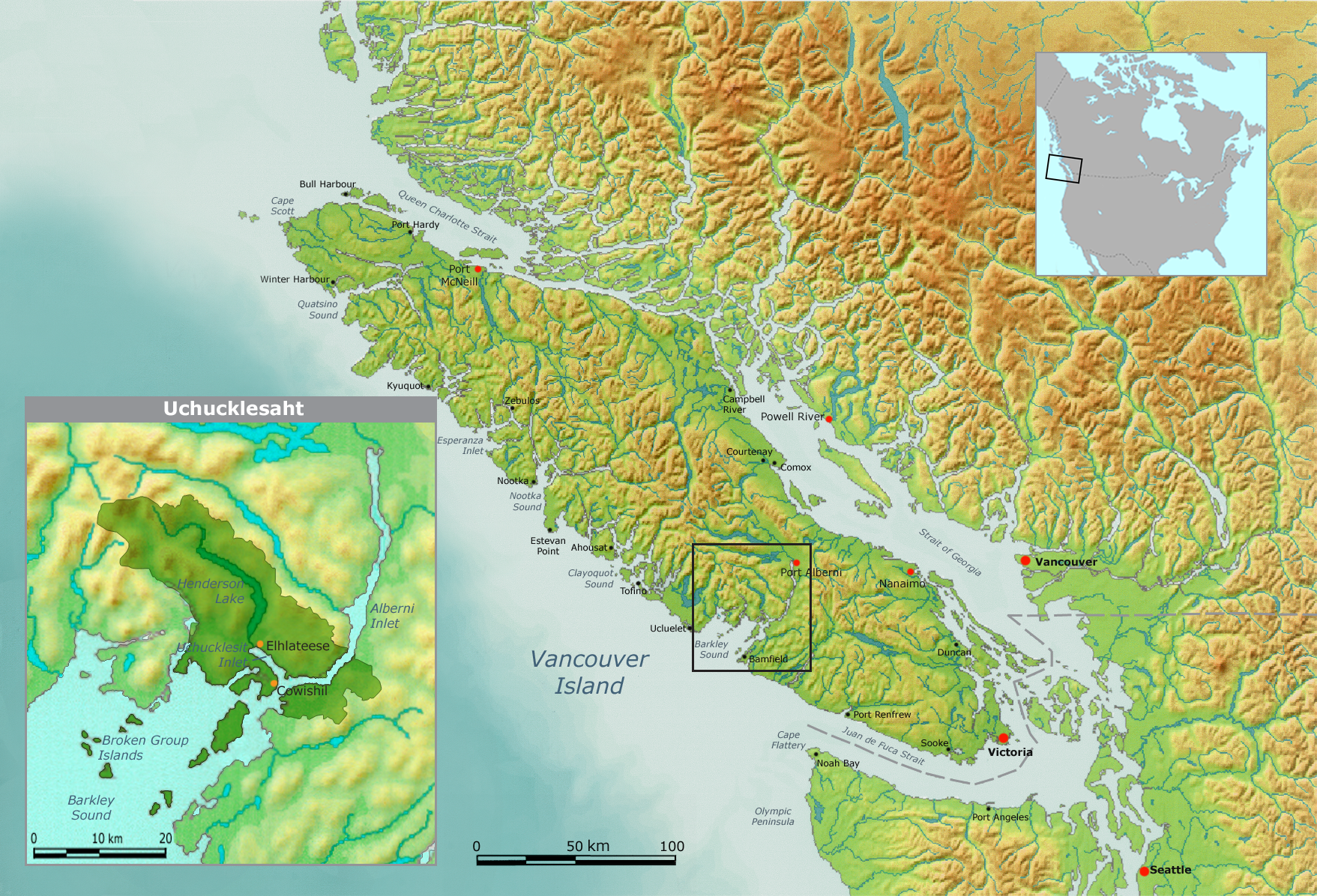
- People: Nuu-chah-nulth
- Headquarters: Port Alberni
- Province: British Columbia

Population (2025)
- On reserve: 26
- On other land: 6
- Off reserve: 227
- Total population: 259

Government
- Chief: Wilfred Cootes Jr.
- Council: Thomas Rush; Sabrina Crowley; Moriah Cootes; Regina Frank; Clifford Charles

Tribal Council
- Nuu-chah-nulth Tribal Council; Maa-nulth First Nations

Website
- www.uchucklesaht.ca

The Uchucklesaht Tribe, or Uchucklesaht First Nation, is a modern treaty government located on the west coast of Vancouver Island in British Columbia, Canada. It is a member of the Maa-nulth Treaty Society and the Nuu-chah-nulth Tribal Council.

== History ==
In 1881, only 56 people were still considered Uchucklesaht. They were assigned their current reservation in the 1880s. In 1881, the inhabitants were divided into eight families with between 3 and 10 members. The oldest member of the tribe was the fisherman Hahklin, aged 70. The chief was Kut luk sulh (40), who headed a family of ten.

There are only a few names of recognizable European origin among the adults, but these appear more frequently among the children. In 1891, only 41 Uchucklesaht were still living on the reservation, divided among five families.

== See also ==
- Nuu-chah-nulth people
- Nuu-chah-nulth language
