= Kiix-in =

Principal residence of the Huu-ay-aht (Ohiaht) group of the Nuu-chah-nulth people

Coordinates: 48°48′55″N 125°10′30″W

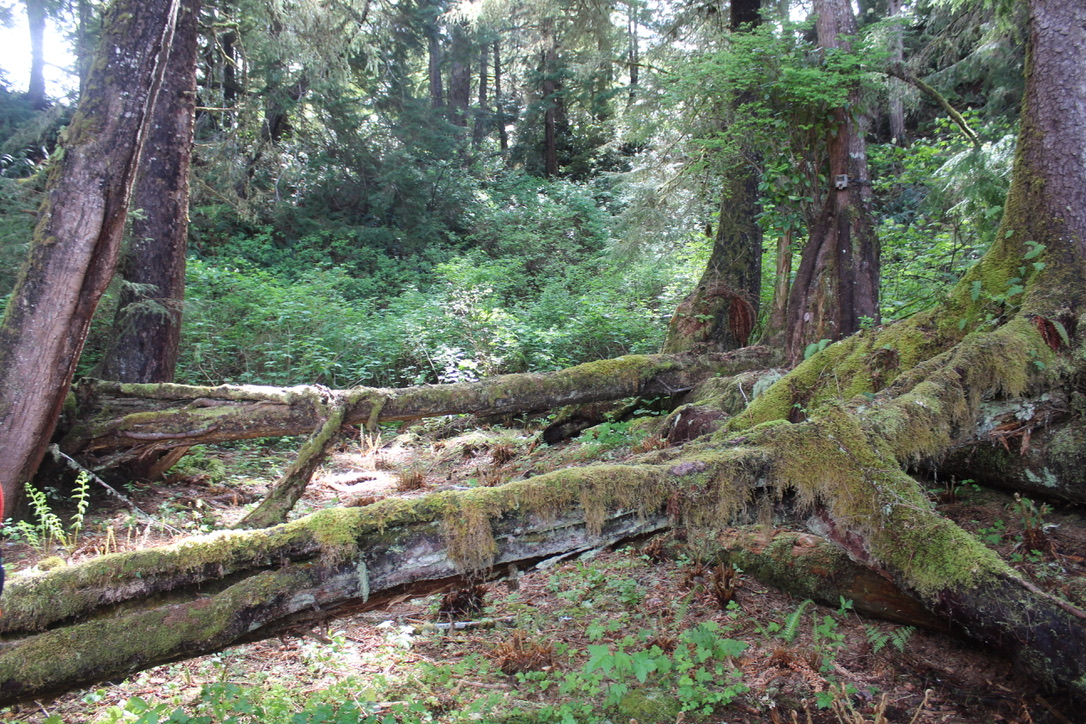
Remains of one of the longhouses

Kiix̣in (pronounced “kee-hin”) is the site of the ancient capital of the Huu-ay-aht First Nations. It is the only known site on the southern coast of British Columbia that contains the undisturbed, standing remains of traditional longhouses of a First Nations’ village. Located on the coast on the southeast shore of Barkley Sound between Bamfield and Cape Beale, the site has four distinct archaeological sites: the main village of Kiix̣in, including the standing remains of eight house; the fortress site; a small midden; and a midden with remains of three houses. The Huu-ay-aht moved from Kiix̣in in the 1880s, and the village has been untouched ever since.

Kiix̣in was officially designated as a National Historic Site by the Historic Sites and Monuments Board of Canada in 1999 and is noted as containing "the best preserved remains of any Nuu-chah-nulth traditional village".

Huu-ay-aht histories identify the village as being occupied "since time began", and an archaeological assessment found that the site had been in use for thousands of years. At some point the Huu-ay-aht were attacked by the Klallam, who drove them from the village; it was later reclaimed some point before 1850. An 1874 census found 246 residents. The village was abandoned in the 1880s or 1890s, with the Huu-ay-aht moving to the Deer Group Islands. With the permission of the Huu-ay-aht, a team of researchers conducted a pioneering dendroarchaeological survey in 2002 on one of the houses, named Quaksweaqwul. The team used core samples to identify the age of the house, estimating that it was constructed some time after 1835.

== See also ==
- Huu-ay-aht First Nation
