= Nuu-chah-nulth =

North American ethnic group

nuučaan̓ułʔatḥ
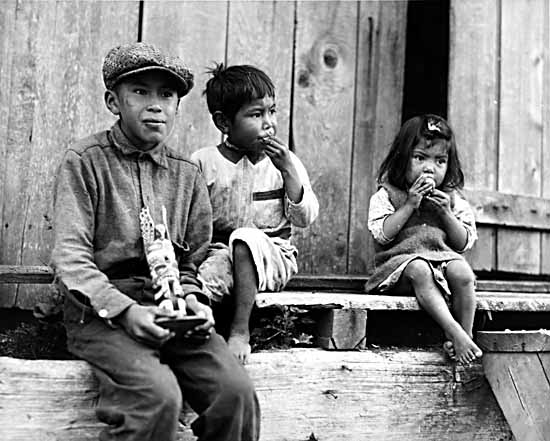
- Three Nuu-chah-nulth children in Yuquot, 1930s

Total population
- In 2016, 4,310 people identified having Nuu-chah-nulth ancestry

Regions with significant populations
- Canada (British Columbia)

Languages
- Nuu-chah-nulth, English, French

Related ethnic groups
- Kwakwaka'wakw, Makah; other Wakashan-speaking peoples

nuučaan̓uuɫ "all along the mountains and sea"
- People: nuučaan̓ułʔatḥ (Nuu-chah-nulth-aht)
- Language: nuučaan̓uɫ (Nuu-chah-nulth)
- Country: nuučaan̓uuɫ ḥaḥuułi (Nuu-chah-nulth Hahoulthee)

The Nuu-chah-nulth (/nuːˈtʃɑːnʊlθ/ noo-CHAH-nuulth; Nuu-chah-nulth: nuučaan̓ułʔatḥ [ˈnuː.t͡ʃaː.ˀnuɬ.ʔatħ]; also called Nuu-chah-nulth-aht or, formerly, Nootka) are one of the Indigenous peoples of the Pacific Northwest Coast in Canada. The term Nuu-chah-nulth is used to describe fifteen related tribes whose traditional home, Nuu-chah-nulth Hahoulthee, is on the west coast of Vancouver Island.

In precontact and early post-contact times, the number of tribes was much greater, but the smallpox epidemics and other consequences of contact with Europeans resulted in the disappearance of some groups and the absorption of others into neighbouring groups. The Nuu-chah-nulth are related to the Kwakwaka'wakw, the Haisla, and the Ditidaht First Nation. The Nuu-chah-nulth language belongs to the Wakashan family.

The governing body is the Nuu-chah-nulth Tribal Council.

== History ==
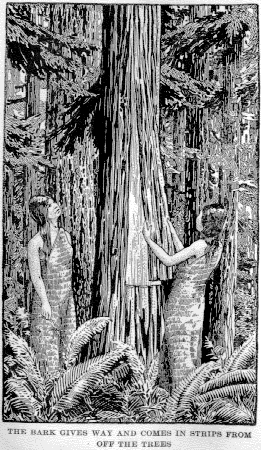
Making cedar bark textile

=== Contact with Europeans ===
When James Cook first encountered the villagers at Yuquot in 1778, they directed him to "come around" (In the Nuu-chah-nulth language nuutkaa means "to circle around") with his ship to the harbour. Cook interpreted this as the First Nation's name for the inlet, now called Nootka Sound. The term was also applied to the indigenous inhabitants of the area.

The Nuu-chah-nulth were among the first Pacific peoples north of California to encounter Europeans, who sailed into their area for trade, particularly the Maritime fur trade. Tensions flared up between Spain and Great Britain over control of Nootka Sound, which led to a bitter international dispute around 1790 known as the Nootka Crisis. It was settled under the Nootka Convention, in which Spain agreed to abandon its exclusive claims to the North Pacific coast. Negotiations to settle the dispute were handled under the aegis and hospitality of Maquinna, a powerful chief of the Mowachaht Nuu-chah-nulth.

A few years later, Maquinna and his warriors captured the American trading ship Boston in March 1803. He and his men killed the captain and all the crew but two, whom they kept as slaves. After gaining release, John R. Jewitt wrote a classic captivity narrative about his nearly 3 years with the Nuu-chah-nulth and his reluctant assimilation to their society. This 1815 book is titled Narrative of the Adventures and Sufferings of John R. Jewitt;, Only Survivor of the Crew of the Ship Boston, during a Captivity of Nearly Three Years among the Savages of Nootka Sound: With an Account of the Manners, Mode of Living, and Religious Opinions of the Natives. In the end, Jewitt escaped with the help of Wickaninnish, a chief from an opposing group.

In 1811 the trading ship Tonquin was blown up in Clayoquot Sound. Tla-o-qui-aht warriors had attacked the ship in revenge for an insult by the ship's captain. The captain and almost all the crew were killed and the ship abandoned. The next day warriors reboarded the empty ship to salvage it. However, a hiding crew member set fire to the ship's magazine and the resulting explosion killed many First Nation peoples. Only one crew member, a pilot / interpreter hired from the nearby Quinault nation, escaped to tell the tale.

From earliest contact with European and American explorers up until 1830, more than 90% of the Nuu-chah-nulth died as a result of infectious disease epidemics, particularly malaria and smallpox. Europeans and Americans were immune, as these diseases were endemic in Europe, but the First Nations had no immunity to them (see Native American disease and epidemics). The high rate of deaths added to the social disruption and cultural turmoil resulting from contact with Westerners. In the early 20th century, the population was estimated at 3,500.

=== 20th century ===
In 1979, the tribes of western Vancouver Island chose the term Nuu-chah-nulth (nuučaan̓uł, meaning "all along the mountains and sea"), as a collective term of identification. This was the culmination of the 1958 alliance forged among these tribes in order to present a unified political voice to the levels of government and European-Canadian society. In 1985, the Government of British Columbia signed an agreement to delegate authority for the delivery of Child Welfare Services to the Nuu-chah-nulth, making the Nuu-chah-nulth the first delegated aboriginal agency in British Columbia.

=== Research ===
In the 1980s, scientists from outside the community recruited Nuu-chah-nulth people as research participants in genetic studies. Those studies used participant blood and other material for purposes which the community did not approve. In 2013, the community had those materials destroyed.

== Bands ==
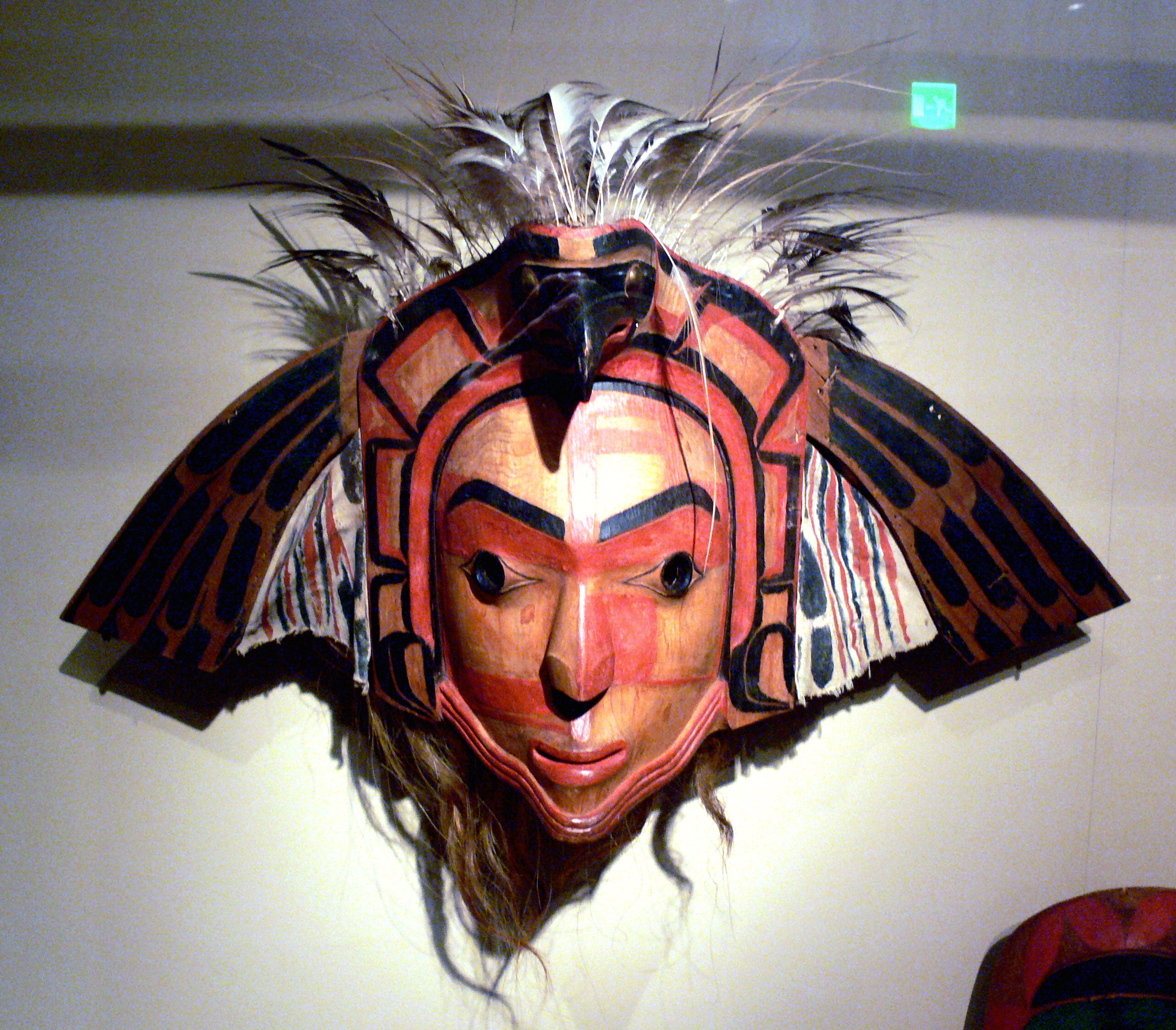
Nootka eagle mask with moveable wings, Ethnological Museum, Berlin, Germany

The Nuu-chah-nulth are represented by 14 band governments. All are represented by the Nuu-chah-nulth Tribal Council, with the exception of Pacheedaht First Nation. As of March 2025, there are over 9,900 registered band members between the 14 band councils.

List of Nuu-chah-nulth band governments
Band government	Nuu-chah-nulth name	Population (2025)	Ref.
Ahousaht First Nation	ʕaaḥuusʔatḥ	2,228	
Ditidaht First Nation	niitiinaʔatḥ	662	
Ehattesaht First Nation	ʔiiḥatisatḥ	568	
Hesquiaht First Nation	ḥiškʷiiʔatḥ	753	
Hupacasath First Nation	huupač̓asʔatḥ	377	
Huu-ay-aht First Nations	huuʕiiʔatḥ	733	
Ka:'yu:'k't'h'/Che:k:tles7et'h'	qaay̓uuk̓ʷatḥ/č̓iiqƛisʔatḥ	581	
Mowachaht/Muchalaht	muwačatḥ/mačłaatḥ	610	
Nuchatlaht First Nation	nučaaƛʔatḥ	167	
Pacheedaht First Nation	p̓aačiinaʔatḥ	301	
Tla-o-qui-aht First Nations	ƛaʔuukʷiʔatḥ	1,242	
Toquaht First Nation	tuk̓̓ʷaaʔatḥ	158	
Tseshaht First Nation	c̓išaaʔatḥ	1,270	
Uchucklesaht First Nation	ḥuučuqƛisʔatḥ	259	
Yuułuʔiłʔatḥ Government	yuułuʔiłʔatḥ	681	

== Culture ==
=== Whaling ===
The Nuu-chah-nulth were one of the few Indigenous peoples on the Pacific Coast who hunted whales. Whaling is essential to Nuu-chah-nulth culture and spirituality. It is reflected in stories, songs, names, family lines, and numerous place names throughout their territories.

Carbon dating shows that the Nuu-chah-nulth peoples hunted whales over 4000 years ago for both blubber and meat. The Nuu-chah-nulth peoples hunted whales of different species due to the range of territory that they reside in and the migration pattern of the whales. Those most often caught would be either grey or humpback whales due to their more docile nature and how close they would come to the shore.

There is evidence that occasionally members of the Nuu-chah-nulth nations would hunt an orca despite the danger and difficulty as a way of showing bravery. Although it was a hazardous undertaking, those that ate “killer whale” regarded both its meat and blubber to be of higher quality than that of the larger whales.

While whaling provided the Nuu-chah-nulth nations with an important source of food and blubber - which could be rendered into oil - it also played an important role in social life as well. The chief would lead a whale hunting party that was made up of other prominent members of the community. The traditional whaling practices of the fourteen different Nuu-chah-nulth nations vary as each community has their own distinct traditions, ceremonies, and rituals. Some simplified examples of Nuu-chah-nulth whaling traditions include ceremonial bathing, abstinence, prayer, and ceremony which were to be performed before and after the hunt. These rituals were performed by the chief leading the hunt as well as his wife; the ceremonies were seen as a key factor in determining the outcome of the hunt. Social status didn't just affect who was allowed to join the whaling hunt, it also affected the distribution of the whales’ meat and the blubber.

Perhaps the most famous Nuu-chah-nulth artifact in modern years is the Yuquot Whalers' Shrine, a ritual house-like structure used in the spiritual preparations for whale hunts. Composed of a series of memorial posts depicting spirit figures and the bones of whaling ancestors, it is stored at the American Museum of Natural History in New York City, having been taken there by European Americans. It was the subject of the film The Washing of Tears, directed by Hugh Brody. It recounts the rediscovery of the bones and other artifacts at the museum and the efforts by the Mowachaht First Nation, the shrine's original owners, who have been seeking to regain these sacred artifacts.

=== Food ===
While the Nuu-chah-nulth nations did rely on whaling as an important food and oil resource, the territories they lived had many other food sources.

The Nuu-chah-nulth peoples gathered food from marine environments including fish species such as halibut, herring, rockfish, and salmon which were caught along the coast while along the shoreline other sea inhabitant like clams, sea urchins, and mussels were harvested at low tide. Salmon streams were tended to ensure their continued strength and the fish were either cooked in large wooden vessels using water and hot stones or dried to be consumed during the winter.

Nuu-chah-nulth nations also gathered resources from the land as food sources. Some of these edible plants include camas root, rhizomes from ferns and many different variety of berries such as blueberry and huckleberry to name a few examples. Some of the Nuu-chah-nulth nations also tended the growth of camas root and Crabapple trees in order to maintain them as a source of food.

Within Nuu-chah-nulth nations individuals passed down their knowledge of when and where to find these marine and land based foods through the generations from elders to youth. This is done both through comprehensive oral histories and through actively teaching children these skills and having them participate in the collection of resources at a young age.

=== Cedar tree use ===
Nuu-chah-nulth nations also used the wood and bark of red and yellow cedar trees as both a building material and to produce many different objects. Artists and wood workers within a nation would carve full logs into totem poles and ocean going canoes, and the bark would be torn into strips and softened in water until malleable enough to be woven into baskets, clothing, and ceremonial regalia.

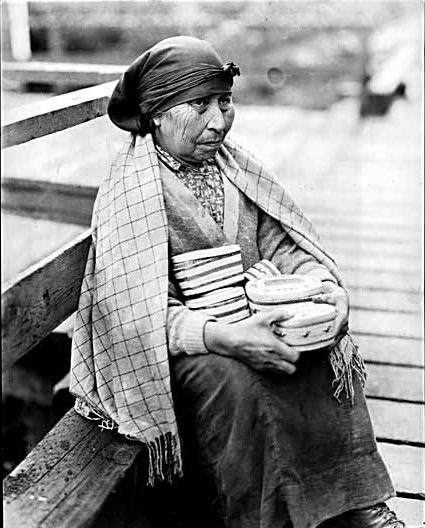
A Nuu-chah-nulth woman selling baskets in Nootka Sound in the 1930s

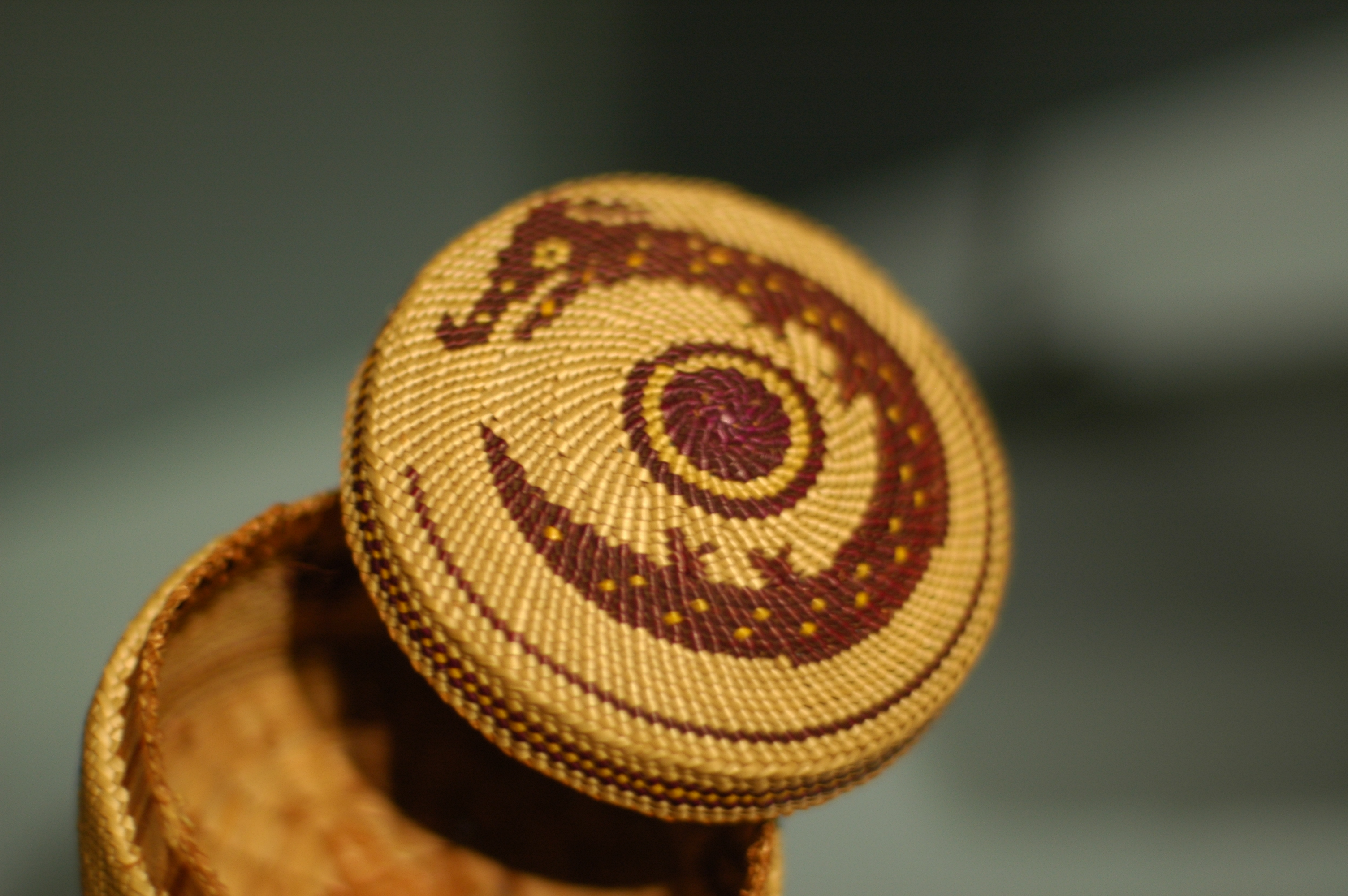
Nuu-chah-nulth basket about two inches wide

=== Social hierarchy ===
Due to the abundance of resources throughout the territories of the Nuu-chah-nulth nations, social life became more structured and a visible hierarchy formed within the communities. These consisted of the commoner class, and the chiefs that controlled the region. While members of the commoner class had autonomy they still required the consent of the chief to fish, hunt, and forage within the communities’ territory.

While being in control of ceremonial and territorial rights, chiefs were also responsible for the redistribution of wealth within their communities. This redistribution of wealth was a key societal factor for the Nuu-chah-nulth nations. A chief's status is realized and maintained by their ability to provide for the members of their nation. By dictating the use of resources, chiefs could maintain social structure, and ensure the continued viability and strength of those resources.

=== Potlatch ===
The Nuu-chah-nulth and other Pacific Northwest cultures are famous for their potlatch ceremonies, in which the host honours guests with generous gifts. The term 'potlatch' is ultimately a word of Nuu-chah-nulth origin. The purpose of the potlatch is manifold: redistribution of wealth, maintenance and recognition of social status, cementing alliances, the celebration and solemnization of marriage, and commemoration of important events.

== Notable people ==
- George Clutesi, artist, actor, writer
- Samuel Haiyupis, carver

== See also ==
- Uu-a-thluk, aquatic management organization
