= Ditidaht First Nation =

First Nations band of southern Vancouver Island, British Columbia, Canada

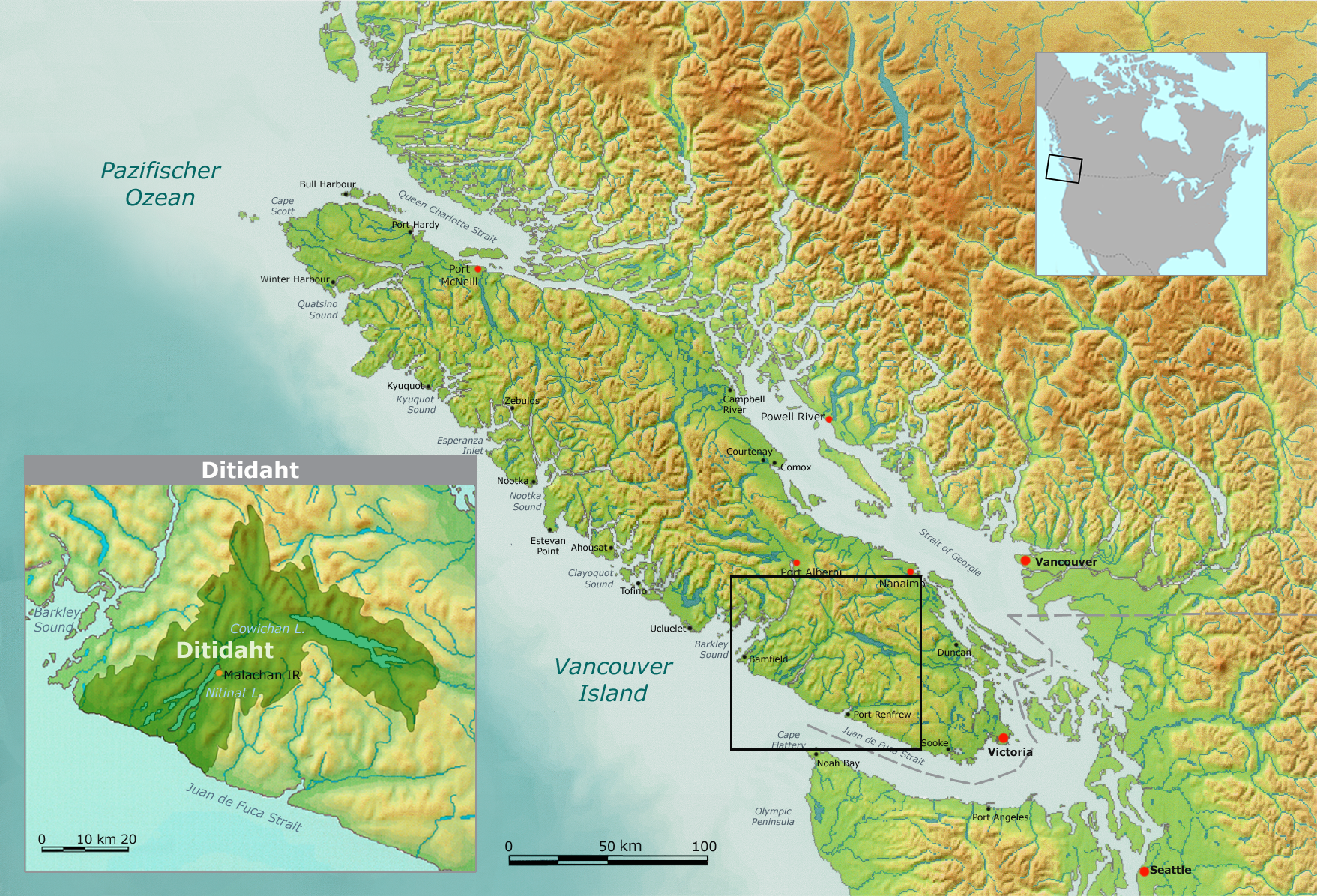

The Ditidaht First Nation (Ditidaht: diitiidʔaaʔtx̣) is a First Nations band government on southern Vancouver Island in British Columbia, Canada.

The government has 17 reserve lands: Ahuk, Tsuquanah, Wyah, Clo-oose, Cheewat, Sarque, Carmanah, Iktuksasuk, Hobitan, Oyees, Doobah, Malachan, Opatseeah, Wokitsas, Chuchummisapo and Saouk. Several of these traditional communities and the West Coast Trail became part of the newly established Pacific Rim National Park Reserve in 1973.

== See also ==
- Nuu-chah-nulth Tribal Council
- Nuu-chah-nulth
- Ditidaht Kids
