= Huu-ay-aht First Nations =

Nuu-chah-nulth band government in British Columbia, Canada

- Band No. 663
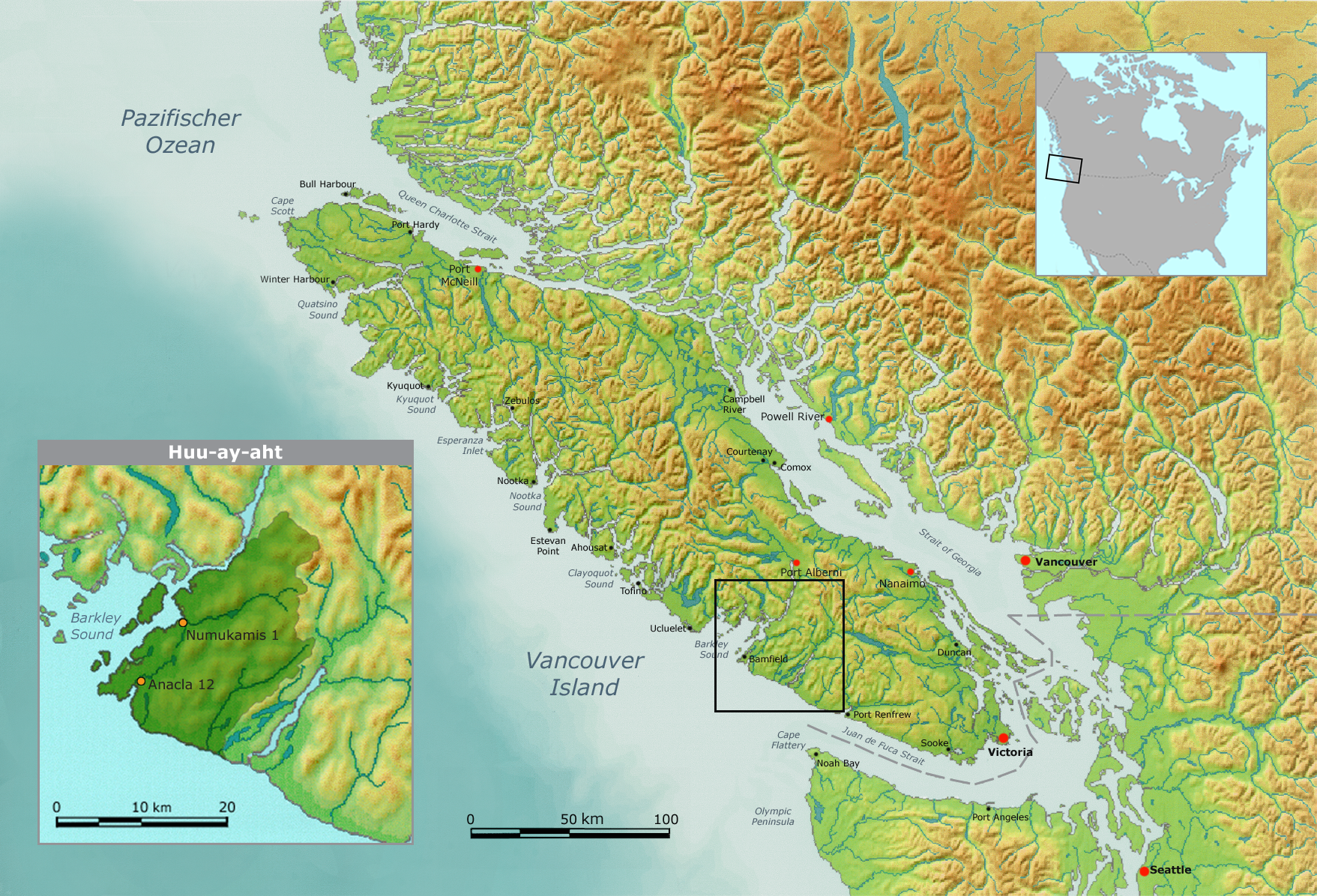
- People: Nuu-chah-nulth
- Headquarters: Port Alberni
- Province: British Columbia

Land
- Land area: 71.81 km^{2} (27.73 sq mi)

Population (2025)
- On reserve: 100
- On other land: 32
- Off reserve: 601
- Total population: 733

Government
- Chief: John Jack

Tribal Council
- Nuu-chah-nulth Tribal Council

Website
- huuayaht.org

The Huu-ay-aht First Nations is a First Nations based on Pachena Bay about 300 km (190 mi) northwest of Victoria, British Columbia, on the west coast of Vancouver Island, in Canada. The traditional territories of the Huu-ay-aht make up the watershed of the Sarita River. The Huu-ay-aht is a member of the Nuu-chah-nulth Tribal Council and is a member of the Maa-nulth Treaty Society. It completed and ratified its community constitution and ratified the Maa-nulth Treaty on 28 July 2007. The Legislative Assembly of British Columbia passed the Maa-nulth First Nations Final Agreement Act on Wednesday, 21 November 2007 and celebrated with the member-nations of the Maa-nulth Treaty Society that evening.

On 8 April 2009, the federal Government of Canada and the provincial Government of British Columbia joined with the Maa-nulth Treaty Society to sign the Maa-nulth Final Agreement in Port Alberni, British Columbia. The Huu-ay-aht and other member-nations of the Maa-nulth Treaty Society then officially entered in the sixth and final stage of the British Columbia Treaty Process, treaty implementation.

== Government ==
The Huu-ay-aht government consists of one chief-councillor and four councillors. The chief-councillor is the head of government and the councillors are legislators. Together, this five person group also forms the executive branch of the Huu-ay-aht government. Currently, the Huu-ay-aht government is elected by the Huu-ay-aht membership for a period of four years.

After the effective date of the Maa-nulth Treaty, the Huu-ay-aht government will be transformed according to the constitution it developed and ratified on 28 April 2007. Under the new Huu-ay-aht First Nations Constitution, the Huu-ay-aht Government will be expanded to seven members total: one elected chief-councillor, one appointed representative of the hereditary chiefs (see below) and five elected councillors.

The new government will also have access to legislative authority over more than what is normally accorded to First Nations in Canada due to the articles of the Maa-nulth Final Agreement: land, governance, taxation and natural resources.

The government has reserve lands in Numukamis, Nuchaquis, Dochsupple, Sachsa, Sachawil, Kirkby Point, Hamilton Point, Haines Island, Keeshan (Kiix?in), Kichha, Clutus, Anacla, and Masit.

== Hereditary chiefs ==
The Huu-ay-aht First Nations were once governed by hereditary chieftains. In the Nuu-chah-nulth language, they are called Ha'wiih (plural) and Ha'wilth (singular). One of these leaders stands above the rest as the Tyee Ha'wilth, or Head Chief. Currently, the Huu-ay-aht has seven hereditary leaders including the head chief.

== Cascadia subduction zone ==
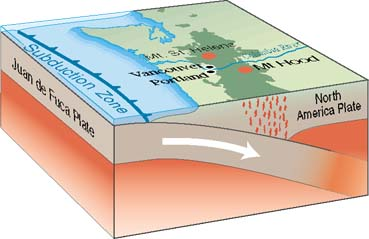
Cascadia subduction zone, Vancouver Island

Pachena Bay is home to the Huu-ay-aht First Nations village of Anacla, "which aboriginal oral history says was devastated when an ancient earthquake convulsed the West Coast of North America."

"First Nations from Vancouver Island to Northern California describe the earthquake and tsunami in similar legends and artwork involving a life-and-death struggle between a thunderbird and a whale that caused the earth to shake violently and the seas to wash away their people and homes...[T]he ancient quake and tsunami devastated the western shores of Vancouver Island and the eastern coast of Japan.

— Meissner 2015

This oral tradition concurs with scientific research into the timing of the 1700 Cascadia earthquake.

Under the sea floor in the Cascadia subduction zone off the west coast of Vancouver Island, the Juan de Fuca Plate and overriding the North American Plate are locked together.

"Right now the two plates are sort of stuck together... They’re locked, yet they are still moving toward each other. What’s happening is there’s a lot of stress building up. The stress builds up over hundreds of years and when it releases it releases in a megathrust earthquake."

— Alison Bird, a Victoria-area Natural Resources Canada seismologist

University of Victoria ocean engineer Kate Moran heads the world-leading Ocean Networks Canada. Moran "previously advised the Obama administration in the United States on climate policy issues [and] headed the first research team into the Indian Ocean area following the Boxing Day earthquake and tsunami." According to Moran, the Boxing Day 2004 and 1700 earthquake and tsunamis were like "ripping open the earth’s zipper."

Moran says, "the Huu-ay-aht council was wise to accept the advice of its elders and build its new administration building high above Pachena Bay because it’s only a matter of time before another devastating tsunami arrives." Although residents still live primarily in lower-lying areas, they are evacuated to the administration building when a tsunami warning is issued; this is an interim step toward a longer-term plan which will eventually see the residents relocated to higher ground as well.

The Ocean Networks Canada "includes a 24-hour ocean monitoring program through a series of Internet connected cables." Scientists study Cascadia, Nankai, Barbados and Chile subduction zones the most because these are the most significant. The University of Victoria will be installing a specialized radar at Tofino’s airport in 2015 to detect tsunami waves far offshore.

In an article published in the scientific journal Nature in 1996, a team of researchers linked the orphaned 1700 tsunami in Japan with a magnitude 9 earthquake and tsunami in North America in a Trans-Pacific reunion. Scientists "dated the earthquake to the evening of January 26, 1700" and approximated its size as magnitude 9.

By 1997 tree-ring dating had securely linked the giant 1700 North American earthquake.

According to a 2005 United States Geological Survey (USGS) report,

"The 1700 Cascadia earthquake probably was such a giant. It likely broke at least 1,000 kilometers of the boundary between the subducting Juan de Fuca Plate and the overriding North America Plate—a rupture about as long as California, or about the length of Japan’s main island, Honshu. On the seaward half of the rupture, the plates probably lurched past one another by about 20 meters. The magnitude was probably in the range M 8.7–9.2."

— USG nd

== See also ==
- Bamfield
- British Columbia Treaty Commission
- Nuu-chah-nulth
- Nuu-chah-nulth language
