= Clayoquot =

Clayoquot /ˈklækwɒt/ is an anglicization of the Nuu-chah-nulth language name "Tla-o-qui-aht", one of the indigenous tribes of the region so named. It may refer to:

- Clayoquot, British Columbia, historically also known as Port Cox, a community on Stubbs Island, just northwest of Tofino, British Columbia
- Clayoquot Sound and the associated region, including:
  - the Clayoquot River
    - Clayoqua 6, an Indian Reserve at the mouth of that river
  - Clayoquot Arm Provincial Park
  - Clayoquot Plateau Provincial Park
- the Tla-o-qui-aht First Nations, a band government of the Nuu-chah-nulth peoples, incorporating a number of historical tribes including:
  - the Tla-o-qui-aht people (the two other groups comprising the Tla-o-qui-aht First Nations are the Hesquiaht and the Ahousaht)
- HMCS Clayoquot, a Canadian minesweeper sunk in World War II
