= HMCS Transcona =

History

Canada
- Name: Transcona
- Namesake: Transcona, Manitoba
- Builder: Marine Industries Ltd., Sorel
- Laid down: 18 December 1940
- Launched: 26 April 1941
- Commissioned: 25 November 1942
- Decommissioned: 31 July 1945
- Identification: Pennant number: J271
- Honours and awards: Atlantic 1943-45
- Fate: Scrapped, 1961

General characteristics
- Class & type: Bangor-class minesweeper
- Displacement: 592 long tons (601 t)
- Length: 162 ft (49.4 m)
- Beam: 28 ft (8.5 m)
- Draught: 8.25 ft (2.51 m)
- Propulsion: 2 shafts, 9-cylinder diesel, 2,000 bhp (1,500 kW)
- Speed: 16 knots (30 km/h)
- Complement: 83
- Armament: 1 × QF 12-pounder 12 cwt naval gun; 1 × QF 2-pounder Mark VIII; 2 × QF 20 mm Oerlikon guns; 40 depth charges as escort

HMCS Transcona was a Bangor-class minesweeper built for the Royal Canadian Navy during the Second World War. She was launched on 26 April 1941. After the war, she was transferred to the Royal Canadian Mounted Police under the name French. The vessel served until 1961 before being sold for scrap and broken up later that year.

== Design and description ==
The Bangor class was initially to be a scaled down minesweeper design of the Halcyon class in Royal Navy service. However, due to the difficulty procuring diesel engines led to the small number of the diesel version being completed. The ships displaced 592 long tons (601 t) standard and 690 long tons (700 t) fully loaded. They were 162 feet (49.4 m) long with a beam of 28 feet (8.5 m) and a draught of 8 feet 3 inches (2.51 m). However, the size of the ship led to criticisms of their being too cramped for magnetic or acoustic minesweeping gear. This may have been due to all the additions made during the war with the installation of ASDIC, radar and depth charges.

The Bangor class came in two versions. Transcona was of the diesel-powered version, being equipped with a 9-cylinder diesel engine driving two shafts that produced 2,000 brake horsepower (1,500 kW). This gave the ship a maximum speed of 16.5 knots (30.6 km/h). The vessels carried 65 long tons (66 t) of oil. The vessels had a complement of 6 officers and 77 ratings.

The Canadian diesel-powered Bangors were armed with a single quick-firing (QF) 12-pounder 12 cwt gun mounted forward. (Note: "Cwt" is the abbreviation for hundredweight, 20 cwt referring to the weight of the gun.) The ships were also fitted with a QF 2-pounder Mark VIII gun aft and were eventually fitted with single-mounted QF 20 mm Oerlikon guns on the bridge wings. For those ships assigned to convoy duty, they were armed with two depth charge launchers and two chutes for the 40 depth charges they carried.

== Service history ==
Transcona was ordered as part of the 1940–41 building programme. The minesweeper's keel was laid on 18 December 1940 by Marine Industries Ltd. at Sorel, Quebec. The ship was launched on 26 April 1941 and Transcona was commissioned at Sorel on 25 November 1942. She was the last Bangor to join the Royal Canadian Navy.

After commissioning, Transcona escorted HMCS Provider to Halifax, Nova Scotia and remained at the shipyard there from 22 December 1942 to 6 March 1943 due to engine defects. Once those were repaired, the minesweeper performed her workups and was assigned to the Western Local Escort Force (WLEF) in April. In June, WLEF's escorts were divided into groups and Transcona was placed in W-2.

She remained with that unit until May 1944 when the minesweeper was transferred to Halifax Force, a local escort force based out of Halifax, Nova Scotia. On 23 December, with sister ship Clayoquot and the frigate Kirkland Lake, Transcona sailed from Halifax on a pre-convoy escort submarine sweep of the swept channel near the Sambro Light Vessel. While the convoy was forming up, the German submarine U-806 fired a torpedo which hit Clayoquot, sinking the minesweeper. Transcona dropped four Carley floats for the survivors while searching for the submarine. Ten minutes after Clayoquot's sinking, a torpedo detonated close to Transcona. The submarine was not found and the corvette Fennel collected survivors. From February to May 1945, Transcona was under refit at Lunenburg, Nova Scotia. She remained with this unit until June, after which the ship was deployed on various local tasks until her decommissioning. The minesweeper was paid off on 31 July 1945 at Sydney, Nova Scotia and laid up.

On 1 September 1945, Transcona was transferred to the Royal Canadian Mounted Police Marine Division and renamed French. (Note: Colledge has the ship transferred to the RCMP in 1950.) The ship remained in service at Halifax until 1960. The vessel was turned over to the Crown Assets Corporation, sold for scrap on 2 February 1961 and broken up at LaHave, Nova Scotia later that year.
