= List of shipwrecks in February 1872 =

The list of shipwrecks in February 1872 includes ships sunk, foundered, grounded, or otherwise lost during February 1872.

== 1 February ==
List of shipwrecks: 1 February 1872
Ship	State	Description
Angelus	United Kingdom	The smack was driven ashore at Bridlington, Yorkshire. Her crew were rescued.
Bee	United Kingdom	The brig was driven ashore and severely damaged near Lossiemouth, Moray. She was on a voyage from Ipswich, Suffolk to Lossiemouth.
Eclipse	United Kingdom	The brig was driven ashore at Ardrossan, Ayrshire. She was on a voyage from Dublin to Ardrossan.
Express	(United Kingdom of Great Britain and Ireland) Jersey	The ship ran aground on the Maplin Sand, in the North Sea off the coast of Essex. She was on a voyage from London to Demerara, British Guiana. She was later refloated and put in to Gravesend, Kent.
Glenmark	United Kingdom	The ship departed from Port Lyttelton, New Zealand for London. No further trace, presumed foundered with the loss of all hands.
Henry Cook	United Kingdom	The ship was driven ashore near Strangford, County Down. She was on a voyage from Liverpool, Lancashire to Pensacola, Florida, United States.
Stowell	United Kingdom	The ship was wrecked in St Brides Bay.
Victor	United Kingdom	The schooner was driven ashore at Kilroot, County Antrim. Her crew were rescued by the Coastguard. She was on a voyage from Ayr to Lisbon, Portugal.

== 2 February ==
List of shipwrecks: 2 February 1872
Ship	State	Description
Elphinstone	Sweden	The ship ran aground on the Sizewell Bank, in the North Sea off the coast of Suffolk, United Kingdom. She was on a voyage from Hull, Yorkshire, United Kingdom to Darien, Georgia, United States. She was refloated and put in to Grimsby, Lincolnshire, United Kingdom in a leaky condition.
Fige Rohoman	India	The brig sprang a leak and foundered. Her crew were rescued. She was on a voyage from Chittagong to Galle, Ceylon.
Unnamed	Netherlands	The galiot was driven ashore at Longman Point, Inverness-shire, United Kingdom.

== 3 February ==
List of shipwrecks: 3 February 1872
Ship	State	Description
British Prince	United Kingdom	The ship was wrecked on the South Carrs Rocks, of the coast of Northumberland. She was on a voyage from Dundee, Forfarshire to Calcutta, India.
Herman E. Poole	United States	The schooner broke from her moorings, drifted out of the harbor of Gloucester, Massachusetts and was lost in a violent snow storm.
Joe Abrahams	United Kingdom	The schooner was driven ashore at Braunton, Devon. She was on a voyage from Newport, Monmoutshshire to Bideford, Devon. She was later refloated and taken in to Appledore, Devon.
Johannes	Germany	The ship foundered in the Atlantic Ocean 300 nautical miles (560 km) off "Saint Sebastian Island". Her crew survived. She was on a voyage from the Rio Grande to Hamburg.
Joseph and Mary	United Kingdom	The ship ran aground on the Batten Reef. She was on a voyage from Plymouth to Porthcawl. She was refloated and resumed her voyage.
Marian Ridley	(Dominion of Newfoundland) Newfoundland Colony	The brig was wrecked on the Cobblers.
Mary	United Kingdom	The schooner collided with at tug and sank in the Bristol Channel. All on board were rescued. She was on a voyage from Lundy Island to Bideford.

== 4 February ==
List of shipwrecks: 4 February 1872
Ship	State	Description
Perseverante	France	The schooner was run into by the steamship Edward Williams (United Kingdom) and sank 10 nautical miles (19 km) off Orfordness, Suffolk, United Kingdom with the loss of two of her five crew.

== 5 February ==
List of shipwrecks: 5 February 1872
Ship	State	Description
Ariel	United Kingdom	The ship was sighted in the English Channel off Start Point, Devon whilst on a voyage from London to Sydney, New South Wales. No further trace, presumed foundered with the loss of all hands.
Fredericke	Germany	The ship was abandoned off Sines, Portugal. She was on a voyage from Zakynthos, Greece to Bremen.
Minnesota	United Kingdom	The barque was wrecked on the Longsand, in the North Sea off the coast of Essex. She was on a voyage from Newcastle upon Tyne, Northumberland to Cartagena, Spain.
Reward	United Kingdom	The schooner was beached at Robin Hoods Bay, Yorkshire, where she was wrecked. Her crew were rescued. She was on a voyage from North Shields, Northumberland to Rouen, Seine-Inférieure, France.
Roxburgh Castle	United Kingdom	The ship was wrecked on the Goodwin Sands, Kent. She was on a voyage from London to Pensacola, Florida, United States.
Starling	United Kingdom	The schooner was driven ashore at Filey, Yorkshire. Her crew were rescued by the Filey Lifeboat.
Vesper	United Kingdom	The steamship ran aground at Berwick upon Tweed, Northumberland. She was on a voyage from Dundee, Forfarshire to Sunderland, County Durham. She was refloated the next day and sailed for Sunderland.

== 6 February ==
List of shipwrecks: 6 February 1872
Ship	State	Description
Agnes	United Kingdom	The ship collided with the barque Finzel (United Kingdom) and sank in the North Sea off Orfordness, Suffolk. Her crew were rescued by Finzel. Agnes was on a voyage from Blyth, Northumberland to Folkestone, Kent.
Cæsar	United Kingdom	The ship was abandoned at sea. She was on a voyage from Newport, Monmouthshire to Huelva, Spain.
Laura and Isabel	United Kingdom	The ship was driven ashore in Dundalk Bay. She was refloated and towed in to Dundalk, County Louth.

== 7 February ==
List of shipwrecks: 7 February 1872
Ship	State	Description
Bertha	United Kingdom	The ship ran aground and sank at Hirsholmene, Denmark. She was on a voyage from Charlestown, Cornwall to Aarhus, Denmark. She was refloated and taken in to Fredrikshavn, Denmark in a severely leaky condition.
Colorado	United Kingdom	The steamship was run into by the steamship Arabian (United Kingdom) in Liverpool Bay and was beached at Crosby, Lancashire with the loss of six lives. Survivors from her 146 passengers were taken off by Arabian. Colorado was on a voyage from Liverpool, Lancashire to New York, United States She subsequently broke in two.
Constance	United States	The barque was driven ashore near "Passaroeng", Netherlands East Indies. She was refloated and towed in to Surabaya, Netherlands East Indies.
Haring	United Kingdom	The ship sank at New York, United States. She was on a voyage from Maracaibo, Venezuela to Falmouth, Cornwall.
William and Charles	United Kingdom	The schooner struck the wreck of the steamship Ada (United Kingdom) and sank in the North Sea. Her crew were rescued by the smack Olive Leaf (United Kingdom). William and Charles was on a voyage from South Shields, County Durham to Exeter, Devon.
Two unnamed vessels	United Kingdom	The screw hoppers were run into by the steamship Bivouac (United Kingdom) and sank at South Shields.

== 8 February ==
List of shipwrecks: 8 February 1872
Ship	State	Description
Carolina	United States	The ship ran aground on the Blackwater Bank, in the Irish Sea. She was on a voyage from Liverpool, Lancashire, United Kingdom to Galveston, Texas. She was refloated and put back to Liverpool.
Fifeshire	United Kingdom	The steamship struck the quayside at Craig, Forfarshire and was severely damaged.
Unnamed	United Kingdom	The steamship ran aground in the Firth of Forth. She was on a voyage from Tayport, Fife to Broughty Ferry, Forfarshire. She was refloated.

== 9 February ==
List of shipwrecks: 9 February 1872
Ship	State	Description
Douro	United Kingdom	The brigantine was driven ashore at Corsewall Point, Wigtownshire. She was on a voyage from Greenock, Renfrewshire to Pernambuco, Brazil. She was refloated but consequently foundered.
Electra	United Kingdom	The steamship collided with Dhollerah (United Kingdom) and sank in the English Channel off Dungeness, Kent. Her twenty crew survived; her captain was rescued by Dhollerah. Other survivors were rescued by Colon (Italy). Electra was on a voyage from Lisbon, Portugal to London. Also reported that eighteen lives were lost.
Frederick	United Kingdom	The brig collided with a brig and the brigantine Helen (both United Kingdom) and was severely damaged. She was on a voyage from London to Rio de Janeiro, Brazil. She put in to Ramsgate, Kent.
Stampede	Canada	The barque was abandoned in the Atlantic Ocean. Her crew were rescued by Albert the Good (United Kingdom). Stampede was on a voyage from Saint John, New Brunswick to Cárdenas, Cuba.
Trent	Fiji	The schooner was holed by a swordfish and sank off Nukufetau.

== 10 February ==
List of shipwrecks: 10 February 1872
Ship	State	Description
Charlotte	Germany	The ship was driven ashore on the coast of Jutland. She was on a voyage from Philadelphia, Pennsylvania, United States to Bremen.
Friedrike	Germany	The ship was driven ashore at St. Ubes, Portugal.
Laurel	United Kingdom	The ship ran aground at Warrenpoint, County Antrim. She was on a voyage from Swansea, Glamorgan to Newry, County Antrim.
Napier	United Kingdom	The brig departed from Fernandina, Florida, United States for Liverpool, Lancashire. No further trace, presumed foundered with the loss of all hands.
Surprise	United Kingdom	The pilot cutter was run down and sunk in the English Channel by the steamship Nile (United Kingdom) with the loss of three lives.
Ubbina	United States	The ship departed from Baltimore, Maryland for Marseille, Bouches-du-Rhône, France. No further trace, presumed foundered with the loss of all hands.
White Rose	United Kingdom	The ship was wrecked at Saquarema, Brazil. Her crew were rescued. She was on a voyage from the Ballestas Island, Peru to Falmouth, Cornwall.

== 11 February ==
List of shipwrecks: 11 February 1872
Ship	State	Description
Clarendon	United Kingdom	The steamship was abandoned in the Atlantic Ocean. Her crew were rescued by the barque Talavera (United States). Clarendon was on a voyage from the Guañape Islands, Peru to Falmouth, Cornwall.
Dwina	United Kingdom	The steamship was driven ashore at Donna Nook, Lincolnshire. She was refloated and taken in to Hull, Yorkshire.
Nancy	United Kingdom	The schooner was driven ashore at Garlieston, Wigtownshire. She was on a voyage from Caernarfon to Douglas, Isle of Man.
Verden	Norway	The barque collided with another vessel in the Atlantic Ocean. She was abandoned the next day. Her crew were rescued by Maggie (United Kingdom). Verden was on a voyage from London, United Kingdom to Chania, Greece and Odesa, Russia.

== 12 February ==
List of shipwrecks: 12 February 1872
Ship	State	Description
Frankfurt	Germany	The steamship was driven ashore on Spiekeroog. She was on a voyage from New Orleans, Louisiana to Bremen. She was refloated and taken in to Bremen.
Ionian	United Kingdom	The barque ran aground on the Bull Sand, in the North Sea off the coast of Lincolnshire. She was on a voyage from Taganrog, Russia to Hull, Yorkshire. She was refloated and completed her voyage.

== 13 February ==
List of shipwrecks: 13 February 1872
Ship	State	Description
Dart	United Kingdom	The schooner sank in Runswick Bay. Her crew were rescued. She was on a voyage from Hartlepool, County Durham to Sandsend, Yorkshire.
Favourite	United Kingdom	The ship was driven ashore at Saltfleet, Lincolnshire. She was on a voyage from Olhão, Portugal to Hull.
George	United Kingdom	The brigantine was destroyed by fire in the River Suir. Her crew were rescued. She was on a voyage from Cork to Neath, Glamorgan.
Mary Dixon	United Kingdom	The schooner foundered in Lough Swilly. Her crew were rescued.
Sarah Cooper	United Kingdom	The schooner sank off Monrovia, Liberia. Her crew were rescued.
Shamrock	United Kingdom	The barque was driven ashore at Tonamore Point, County Donegal. Her crew were rescued. She was on a voyage from Ardrossan, Ayrshire to St. Jago de Cuba, Cuba.
Surprise	United Kingdom	The ship was wrecked on the Sheaf Rock, off Portland Bill, Dorset. Her crew were rescued. She was on a voyage from Bridport, Dorset to Hartlepool, county Durham.
Zwolte	Netherlands	The derelict galiot drove ashore north of Scarborough, Yorkshire.

== 14 February ==
List of shipwrecks: 14 February 1872
Ship	State	Description
Adler	Germany	The ship ran aground on the Gelbsand, in the North Sea. She was on a voyage from Cuxhaven to an English port. She was refloated and towed in to Cuxhaven in a leaky condition.
Beatrice	United Kingdom	The smack was driven ashore and wrecked at Sizewell, Suffolk.
Ethel	United Kingdom	The steamship ran aground at Hull, Yorkshire.
Harry Booth, or Mary Booth	United Kingdom	The ship was wrecked on the Cobblers.
Ispahan	United Kingdom	The steamship departed from Malta for Dunkirk, Nord, France. No further trace, presumed subsequently foundered off Brest, Finistère, France with the loss of all on board.
Levant	United Kingdom	The barque was driven ashore at Passage West, County Cork. Her crew were rescued. She was on a voyage from the River Clyde to Grenada. She was refloated.
Northumbria	United Kingdom	The ship was driven ashore at Clough, County Down. She was on a voyage from Troon, Ayrshire to Trinidad.

== 15 February ==
List of shipwrecks: 15 February 1872
Ship	State	Description
Active	United Kingdom	The schooner was driven ashore and wrecked at Peterhead, Aberdeenshire. Her crew were rescued by rocket apparatus. She was on a voyage from Peterhead to Nairn.
Florine	United Kingdom	The ship was driven out to sea from Sainte-Suzanne, Réunion during a cyclone. No further trace, presumed foundered with the loss of all hands.
Frances	United Kingdom	The steamship was driven ashore at Dimlington, Yorkshire. Her crew were rescued by a smack. She was on a voyage from Gothenburg, Sweden to London.
Iron Era	United Kingdom	The steamship ran aground on the Nore. She was on a voyage from Rotterdam, South Holland, Netherlands to London. She was refloated.
Montana	United States	The ship was destroyed by fire off St. Paul Island, Nova Scotia, Canada. Her crew took refuge on the island, from where they were rescued on 20 February by the barque Trencaneau (United Kingdom). Montana was on a voyage from Boston, Massachusetts to Hong Kong.

== 16 February ==
List of shipwrecks: 16 February 1872
Ship	State	Description
Margaret Nixon	United Kingdom	The ship ran aground on the Corton Sand, in the North Sea off the coast of Suffolk. She was refloated and taken in to Lowestoft, Suffolk in a leaky condition
Sarah	United Kingdom	The ship was driven ashore at Dundrum, County Down. She was on a voyage from Dundrum to the Bristol Channel.
Scarba	United Kingdom	The ship was wrecked on the Cannon Rock. She was on a voyage from Cardiff, Glamorgan to Belfast, County Antrim.

== 17 February ==
List of shipwrecks: 17 February 1872
Ship	State	Description
Famille	France	The ship departed from Cheribon, Netherlands East Indies for Melbourne, Victoria. No further trace, presumed foundered with the loss of all hands.
Springbok	United Kingdom	The ship ran aground on the Middle Sand, in the North Sea. She was on a voyage from South Shields, County Durham to Messina, Sicily, Italy. She was refloated and put in to Grimsby, Lincolnshire.
No. 12	Belgium	The pilot cutter was run down and sunk by a barque off Hastings, Sussex, United Kingdom. All on board survived.

== 19 February ==
List of shipwrecks: 19 February 1872
Ship	State	Description
Lanercost	United Kingdom	The barque was sighted off Fortress Monroe, Virginia, United States whilst on a voyage from Baltimore, Maryland, United States to Belfast, County Antrim. No further trace, presumed foundered with the loss of all hands.
Lequille	United States	The schooner was abandoned in the Atlantic Ocean. Her crew were rescued. She was on a voyage from Annapolis, Maryland to the West Indies.
Scarba	United Kingdom	The ship was wrecked on the Cannon Rock, of the coast of County Down. She was on a voyage from Cardiff, Glamorgan to Belfast.

== 20 February ==
List of shipwrecks: 20 February 1872
Ship	State	Description
Heathcote	New Zealand	The 22-ton ketch became wrecked after stranding at the entrance of Whanganui Inlet.
Valparaiso	United Kingdom	The steamship was driven ashore and wrecked on Lagartija Island, Chile. All on board were rescued. She was on a voyage from Calbuco to Ancud, Chile.

== 21 February ==
List of shipwrecks: 21 February 1872
Ship	State	Description
Britannia	United Kingdom	The schooner was driven ashore at Campbeltown, Argyllshire. She was on a voyage from Greenock, Renfrewshire to Cardiff, Glamorgan. She was refloated and put back to Greenock.
Eliza	United Kingdom	The ship departed from Savannah, Georgia, United States for London. No further trace, presumed foundered with the loss of all hands.
Ghint	Denmark	The barque was run into and sunk 2 nautical miles (3.7 km) off Hong Kong by the paddle steamer Geelong (New Zealand). Her crew were rescued. She was then run into by the steamship Arretoon Apcar (Flag unknown).

== 22 February ==
List of shipwrecks: 22 February 1872
Ship	State	Description
Auray	Germany	The ship was driven ashore at Keitum, Sylt. She was on a voyage from Jamaica to Hamburg. She was refloated but drove ashore again and was wrecked.
Ivanhoe	United States	The ship departed from Pensacola, Florida for Sunderland, County Durham, United Kingdom. No further trace, presumed foundered with the loss of all hands.

== 23 February ==
List of shipwrecks: 23 February 1872
Ship	State	Description
Alix	France	The schooner was wrecked on Flores Island, Azores with the loss of nine of her ten crew. She was on a voyage from the Rio Grande to Havre de Grâce, Seine-Inférieure.
Aristis	Greece	The brig was driven ashore at Yevpatoria, Russia.

== 24 February ==
List of shipwrecks: 24 February 1872
Ship	State	Description
General Banks	United States	The schooner was abandoned at sea. Her crew were rescued by the barque Sarah Crowell ( Canada.
Miranda	United Kingdom	The barque was abandoned in the Atlantic Ocean. Her crew were rescued.
Onehunga	New Zealand	The 61-ton schooner hit rocks and foundered while trying to leave Oamaru Harbour in a heavy swell.

== 25 February ==
List of shipwrecks: 25 February 1872
Ship	State	Description
Charlotte Maule	United Kingdom	The schooner was driven ashore and severely damaged at Elie, Fife.
Gleaner	United Kingdom	The barque was driven ashore at Leven, Fife. She was on a voyage from the River Spey to Leith, Lothian. She was refloated and towed in to Leith.
Harlequin	United Kingdom	The steamship ran aground on the Ooster Bank, in the North Sea off the coast of Zeeland, Netherlands She was on a voyage from Sunderland, County Durham to Rotterdam, South Holland, Netherlands. She was refloated and towed in to Hellevoetsluis.
Marshall	United Kingdom	The schooner was driven ashore at Aberdeen.
Westborough	United Kingdom	The steamship was driven ashore in the Nieuwegat. She was on a voyage from Saint Domingo to Rotterdam, South Holland, Netherlands. She was refloated and towed in to Goeree, Zeeland, Netherlands.
Unnamed	flag unknown	The barque was driven ashore and wrecked at Newbiggin, Northumberland.

== 26 February ==
List of shipwrecks: 26 February 1872
Ship	State	Description
Elizabeth	United Kingdom	The barque ran aground on the Corton Sand, in the North Sea off the coast of Suffolk. She was refloated with the assistance of a tug and found to be leaky.
Glenalva	United Kingdom	The ship was driven ashore at Boulmer, Northumberland. She was on a voyage from Banff, Aberdeenshire to Warkworth, Northumberland. She was refloated.
Hector	United Kingdom	The ship foundered in the North Sea off Whitby, Yorkshire. Her crew were rescued. She was on a voyage from Seaham, County Durham to Rochester, Kent.
Maria	New South Wales	The ship was wrecked off Palm Island, Queensland with the loss of 35 of the 47 people on board. Some of the victims survived the wreck, but were murdered by the local Aboriginal people. She was on a voyage from Sydney to New Guinea.
Sylvanus	United Kingdom	The polacca capsized at Penarth, Glamorgan.
Telegraph	United Kingdom	The ship was driven ashore and severely damaged at Kingstown, County Dublin. She was on a voyage from Dundrum, County Down to Bristol, Gloucestershire.
T. Orion	United Kingdom	The ship ran aground in the River Nene. She was on a voyage from the Black Sea to Wisbech, Cambridgeshire. She was refloated the next day and was taken in to Wisbech for repairs.
Unnamed	Flag unknown	The brigantine sprang a leak and foundered in the North Sea off Great Yarmouth, Norfolk.

== 27 February ==
List of shipwrecks: 27 February 1872
Ship	State	Description
Christianden IX	Denmark	The ship was sighted off Fortress Monroe, Virginia, United States whilst on a voyage from Baltimore, Maryland to Belfast, County Antrim, United Kingdom. No further trace, presumed foundered with the loss of all hands.
Emiliano	Spain	The steamship Parthia collided with the steamshipe Nina (both United Kingdom) in the River Mersey. Nina heeled over onto Emiliano, which was severely damaged. She was beached at Tranmere, Cheshire, United Kingdom. She was on a voyage from Manila, Spanish East Indies to Liverpool, Lancashire, United Kingdom.
Gwalior	United Kingdom	The ship was driven ashore south of Aldeburgh, Suffolk. She was on a voyage from London to Middlesbrough, Yorkshire. She was refloated.
Pawnee	United Kingdom	The ship was driven ashore in the Copeland Islands, County Down and was wrecked. SHe was on a voyage from Dublin to Ayr.
Thomas and Kate	(United Kingdom of Great Britain and Ireland) Jersey	The ship sank in the Carlingford Lough. Her crew were rescued. She was on a voyage from Carlingford, County Louth to Cardiff, Glamorgan. She was refloated in early March and taken in to Warrenpoint, County Down.

== 28 February ==
List of shipwrecks: 28 February 1872
Ship	State	Description
Donna Maria	United Kingdom	The ship sprang a leak and was beached at Campbeltown, Argyllshire. She was on a voyage from Irvine, Ayrshire to Maryport, Cumberland.
Prince of Wales	United Kingdom	The schooner sprang a leak and was beached at Hubberstone, Pembrokeshire. She was on a voyage from Bangor, Caernarfonshire to Ipswich, Suffolk.

== 29 February ==
List of shipwrecks: 19 February 1872
Ship	State	Description
Aura	(Russian Empire) Grand Duchy of Finland	The ship ran aground at Cádiz, Spain.
Curlew	United Kingdom	The Mersey Flat ran aground in Liverpool Bay.
Freddy	Norway	The steamship ran aground at Tønsberg. She was refloated and taken in to Tønsberg.
San Giacomo	Flag unknown	The ship was driven ashore at Queenstown, County Cork, United Kingdom. Her crew were rescued. She was refloated on 2 February and towed in to Queenstown.

== Unknown date ==
List of shipwrecks: Unknown date in February 1872
Ship	State	Description
Abiunfelle	Norway	The barque was wrecked off "Cannon Bruc", Jamaica. She was on a voyage from Liverpool, Lancashire, United Kingdom to Matamoros, Mexico.
Agnes Jack	United Kingdom	The ship was driven ashore near Queenstown, County Cork. She was on a voyage from Porthcawl, Glamorgan to Cork.
Anna Howitz	United Kingdom	The ship was driven ashore on Inishmurray, County Sligo. She was on a voyage from Odesa, Russia to Sligo.
Ann Coppin	United Kingdom	The schooner was driven ashore and wrecked at Gourock, Renfrewshire. She was on a voyage from Dublin to Glasgow, Renfrewshire.
Antje	Netherlands	The ship ran aground in the Ventejagers Gat. She was on a voyage from Batavia, Netherlands East Indies to a Dutch port. She was refloated and taken in to Hellevoetsluis, Zeeland.
Anven	United Kingdom	The schooner was driven ashore and wrecked on the Isle of Skye, Outer Hebrides.
Atlantic	United Kingdom	The steamship ran aground in the River Mersey. She was on a voyage from Liverpool to New York, United States. She was refloated and resumed her voyage.
Baltic	United States	The ship was driven ashore and wrecked on Bodie Island, North Carolina. She was on a voyage from New York to St. Mary's.
Barth	Germany	The barque was abandoned at sea.
Berhampore	United Kingdom	The ship ran aground in the Hooghly River. She was on a voyage from Calcutta, India to London. She was refloated and resumed her voyage.
British Crown	United Kingdom	The ship was driven ashore at Lagos, Portugal. She was on a voyage from Águilas, Spain to Newcastle upon Tyne, Northumberland.
Burgh	United Kingdom	The steamship ran aground in the Ranza Fullah Channel, in the Hooghly River. She was refloated.
Captain Cook	United Kingdom	The ship was driven ashore at Whitby, North Riding of Yorkshire. She was on a voyage from London to Whitby.
Chadiconne	France	The ship was severely damaged by fire at Bordeaux, Gironde.
Chu-Kiang	China	The steamship was wrecked on "Reef Island". All on board were rescued. She was on a voyage from Shanghai to Hong Kong.
Cleo	United Kingdom	The ship was wrecked at the mouth of the Cape Fear River. She was on a voyage from Wilmington, Delaware, United States to Queenstown.
Concordia	France	The barque was wrecked at Clayoquot, British Columbia, Canada.
Diana	United Kingdom	The steamship was driven ashore near Lagos. She was refloated.
Elizabeth Fry	United Kingdom	The full-rigged ship was destroyed by fire. Her crew were rescued. she was on a voyage from New Orleans, Louisiana, United States to Liverpool.
Elsey	United States	The ship was driven ashore at Cape Cod, Massachusetts. She was on a voyage from Inagua, Bahamas to Boston, Massachusetts.
Emanuel	(France) French Guiana	The ship was wrecked at La Parguera, Puerto Rico. All on board were rescued. She was on a voyage from Cayenne to Haiti.
Emeline	Chile	The coaster, a schooner, collided with Margaret (United Kingdom) and sank at Valparaíso on or before 17 February.
Emilie	United Kingdom	The ship ran aground on "Svittengen". She was on a voyage from Charlestown, Cornwall to Copenhagen, Denmark. She was refloated and taken in to Fredrikshavn, Denmark in a leaky condition.
Ernst von Homeyer	Germany	The barque was run into by vessel and was abandoned off the Spanish coast. All on board were rescued. She was on a voyage from Hamburg to Buenos Aires, Argentina. Ernst von Homeyer was subsequently discovered in the Atlantic Ocean (45°50′N 9°34′W) by the barque Riccardo (Austria-Hungary), which put five of her ten crew on board. She was taken in to the Isles of Scilly, United Kingdom, where she arrived on 14 February.
Euxine	United Kingdom	The ship was damaged by fire at Pensacola, Florida, United States between 6 and 13 February.
Faith	United Kingdom	The Thames barge sank in the River Thames at Rotherhithe, Surrey. She was later refloated.
Firmeza	Portugal	The ship was driven ashore and wrecked at Cascais on February 10. She was on a voyage from Pernambuco, Brazil to Lisbon.
Floris	Netherlands	The ship was wrecked at Samarang, Netherlands East Indies. She was on a voyage from Java, Netherlands East Indies to Rotterdam, South Holland.
Glad Tidings	United Kingdom	The ship collided with another vessel and ran aground on the Goodwin Sands, Kent. She was on a voyage from Great Yarmouth, Norfolk to Liverpool. She was refloated with assistance and taken in to Ramsgate, Kent.
Glemt	Siam	The ship collided with the steamship Geelong (Victoria) and sank at Hong Kong.
Golden Era	(Dominion of Newfoundland) Newfoundland Colony	The ship was wrecked. She was on a voyage from Newfoundland to Prince Edward Island, Canada.
Good Intent	United Kingdom	The ship ran aground on Hewett's Gat, in the North Sea. She was on a voyage from South Shields, County Durham to London. She was refloated and put in to Lowestoft, Suffolk in a leaky condition.
Goodwood	United Kingdom	The barque foundered off "Kutale Island", in the Sea of Marmara. She was on a voyage from Thessaloniki, Greece to Constantinople, Ottoman Empire.
Hans Tode	Norway	The ship was driven ashore and wrecked at Cascais on February, 10. She was on a voyage from Sunderland, County Durham to Lisbon.
Harriet	United Kingdom	The barque was abandoned in the Atlantic Ocean. SHe was on a voyage from Montreal, Quebec, Canada to Queenstown.
Heart of Oak	United Kingdom	The smack was driven ashore and wrecked between Newhaven and Seaford, Sussex.
Heltos	Norway	The ship was driven ashore at Cape Sestos, Ottoman Empire. She was on a voyage from Taganrogl, Russia to Malta.
India	United Kingdom	The ship ran aground. She was on a voyage from Pensacola to Liverpool. She was refloated and taken in to Key West, Florida.
Jarvan	United Kingdom	The ship was abandoned at sea. She was on a voyage from Saint Vincent to Harbour Grace, Newfoundland Colony.
Jessie Eaton	United Kingdom	The brigantine ran aground at Lagos and was severely damaged. She was on a voyage from Lagos to London.
Johannes	Flag unknown	The ship ran aground at the mouth of the Goatzacoales River. She was refloated two days later.
John Campbell	United Kingdom	The ship was driven ashore at Darien, Georgia, United States.
John Greenway	Canada	The ship was destroyed by fire at Pictou, Nova Scotia.
Johnny	United Kingdom	The ship was driven ashore near Oskarshamn, Sweden. She was on a voyage from Newcastle upon Tyne to Westervik, Sweden. She was refloated.
Jonge Cornelis	Netherlands	The ship ran aground in the Jagersgate. She was on a voyage from Batavia to a Dutch port. She was refloated and taken in to Hellevoetsluis.
Jonge Jan	Netherlands	The ship ran aground in the Ventejagers Gat. She was on a voyage from Bantam, Netherlands East Indies to a Dutch port. She was refloated.
Kalodyne	United Kingdom	The ship was wrecked off Mauritius.
Kehrwieder	Germany	The ship was driven ashore at Nyborg, Denmark. She was on a voyage from an African port to Flensburg. She was refloated and completed her voyage.
Lady Melville	United Kingdom	The ship ran aground at Calcutta. She was refloated but ran aground again.
L. A. Foster	United Kingdom	The ship was driven ashore at Hurst Castle, Hampshire. She was on a voyage from Portsmouth, Hampshire to Poole, Dorset. She was refloated.
La Gloire	Belgium	The ship ran aground at New York. She was on a voyage from New York to Antwerp. She was refloated and taken in to Staten Island.
Landscape	United Kingdom	The ship foundered. She was on a voyage from Amble, Northumberland to Boulogne, Pas-de-Calais, France.
Leda	France	The schooner collided with the steamship Ledgemoor (United Kingdom) and sank in the Bristol Channel 10 nautical miles (19 km) off Lundy Island, Devon, United Kingdom with the loss of a crew member. She was on a voyage from Cardiff, Glamorgan to Nantes, Loire-Inférieure.
Leo	United Kingdom	The steamship ran aground on the Haisborough Sands, in the North Sea off the coast of Norfolk. She was on a voyage from Hartlepool, County Durham to Alexandria, Egypt. She was refloated and taken in to Hull, Yorkshire.
Lively	United Kingdom	The ship collided with the barque Deerhound (United Kingdom) and sank. She was refloated and taken in to Margate, Kent.
Lord Derby	United Kingdom	The barque sank in the River Thames at Blackwall, Middlesex.
Maidit	Netherlands	The ship was driven ashore at Pekela, Groningen. She was on a voyage from Surabaya, Netherlands East Indies to Amsterdam, North Holland. She was refloated and resumed her voyage.
Marcelle	United Kingdom	The ship was abandoned. Her crew were rescued. She was on a voyage from Bermuda to Halifax, Nova Scotia, Canada.
Margaret Pugh	United Kingdom	The ship was driven ashore on the west coast of Heligoland. She was refloated.
Marie	United Kingdom	The schooner was driven ashore on Guernsey, Channel Islands. She was on a voyage from Plymouth, Devon to Granville, Manche, France.
Mario	Austria-Hungary	The ship was wrecked at San Domingo.
Mars	Germany	The ship ran aground on Amager, Denmark. She was on a voyage from Lübeck to Vindava, Courland Governorate. She was refloated.
Mary	United States	The ship was driven ashore at Cape Henlopen, Delaware. She was on a voyage from Palermo, Sicily, Italy to Philadelphia, Pennsylvania. She was refloated and taken in to a port in Delaware.
Mary Ann May	United Kingdom	The ship was wrecked west of St Ann's Head, Pembrokeshire. She was on a voyage from Barrow-in-Furness, Lancashire to Llanelly, Glamorgan.
Mary Lawson	United Kingdom	The ship ran aground at Dundalk, County Louth. She was on a voyage from Chester, Cheshire to Dundalk. She was refloated and taken in to Dundalk in a severely leaky condition.
May Queen	United Kingdom	The ship was wrecked on the Brill, near Surabaya. Her crew were rescued. She was on a voyage from Bangkok, Siam to Hong Kong.
May Queen	United Kingdom	The ship was destroyed by fire at a port in Surinam.
Midlothian	United Kingdom	The ship ran aground on the Brake Sand. She was on a voyage from London to Tobago. She was refloated and towed in to The Downs.
Militad	United States	The ship ran aground on the South Breakers, off the coast of South Carolina. She was on a voyage from Bristol, Gloucestershire, United Kingdom to Pensacola. She was refloated and taken in to Charleston, South Carolina.
Miniotto	United Kingdom	The ship ran aground on the Longsand, in the North Sea off the coast of Essex. SHe was on a voyage from South Shields to Cartagena, Spain.
M. Louisa	United Kingdom	The ship was wrecked, She was on a voyage from Newport, Monmouthshire to Cienfuegos, Cuba.
Moir	United Kingdom	The schooner was wrecked at Corran, Inverness-shire. She was on a voyage from Ballachulish, Inverness-shire to Dundee, Forfarshire.
Myrtle	United Kingdom	The ship was abandoned in a sinking condition on or before 14 February. Her crew were rescued by the smack Star (United Kingdom). She came ashore at Spurn Point, Yorkshire and was wrecked.
Nemesis	United Kingdom	The steamship ran aground in the Hooghly River. She was refloated.
Newry	United Kingdom	The ship was driven ashore and wrecked on "Blockhouse Island".
Oriental	France	The barque was destroyed by fire at sea. All 73 people on board took to three boats; they were rescued two days later by the barque Delta (United Kingdom). Oriental was on a voyage from Bordeaux to New Caledonia.
Panuco	United Kingdom	The barque was wrecked at Veracruz, Mexico. Her crew were rescued. She was on a voyage from the River Tyne to Veracruz.
Peruvian Congress	Canada	The ship caught fire at Cardiff and was scuttled.
Polar Star	United Kingdom	The ship was driven ashore near Peterhead, Aberdeenshire.
Princess Royal	United Kingdom	The ship ran aground. She was on a voyage from Seaham, County Durham to London. She was refloated and assisted in to Great Yarmouth.
Pye	United Kingdom	The ship was driven ashore and wrecked near Brouwershaven, Zeeland. She was on a voyage from Newcastle upon Tyne to Dordrecht, South Holland.
Rainbow	Canada	The ship sprang a leak and was beached on Barbuda. She was declared a total loss.
Robert Fletcher	United States	The ship was driven ashore at East Moriches, New York. She was on a voyage from Hong Kong to New York City.
Rosetta	United States	The ship was driven ashore at Cape Henry, Virginia. She was on a voyage from Demerara, British Guiana to Baltimore, Maryland. She was refloated and towed in to Norfolk, Virginia.
Sabra Moses	Canada	The ship was sunk by ice at Newcastle. She was on a voyage from Philadelphia to Havre de Grâce, Seine-Inférieure, France.
Samuel G. Reed	United States	The ship was driven ashore on the coast of Sumatra, Netherlands East Indies before 10 February. She was on a voyage from Shanghai to New York. She was refloated with the assistance of a steamship and taken in to Batavia, Netherlands East Indies. It was intended that she would be repaired at Singapore, Straits Settlements.
San Nicholo	Flag unknown	The ship was wrecked near Rhodes, Greece.
Sophie	United States	The barque was wrecked on Honshu, Japan.
Stirling Castle	United Kingdom	The tug sank at Peterhead. She was a total loss.
S. Vito	Italy	The ship was wrecked near Trapani, Sicily.
Theixioni	Greece	The ship was driven ashore in the Isles of Scilly, United Kingdom. She was refloated.
Triumph	United Kingdom	The schooner collided with the tug Warrior (United Kingdom) and sank off the Middle Mouse Sand, in Liverpool Bay. She was refloated on 12 July 1873 and beached at Cemaes, Anglesey.
Two Sisters	United Kingdom	The ship was driven ashore at Port Hood, Nova Scotia.
Viola	United States	The ship was wrecked. She was on a voyage from the Cornwallis River to Boston, Massachusetts.
Waldemar	Denmark	The steamship was driven ashore at Torekov, Sweden. She was on a voyage from Hull to Königsberg and/or Pillau, Germany. She had been refloated by 3 February and had resumed her voyage.
Wando	United States	The steamship was abandoned in the Atlantic Ocean. She was on a voyage from New York to Havana, Cuba.
William and Ann	United Kingdom	The smack was wrecked on Scroby Sands, Norfolk. Her crew were rescued by the steamship Gladstone (United Kingdom).
Zephyr	United Kingdom	The steamship was driven ashore at Porto, Portugal.
