= Freedom Cove =

Artificial island in British Columbia, Canada

Coordinates: 49°15′48″N 125°51′18″W

Freedom Cove is an artificial island in Cypress Bay near Clayoquot Sound, British Columbia, Canada. It was built by artists Wayne Adams and Catherine King. Construction began in the summer of 1991 and has continued to the present day. The island consists of a dozen platforms that include greenhouses, an art gallery, an art studio and a dance floor, built atop recycled fish-farming structures.
