= NSLP =

NSLP is an initialism that may refer to

- National School Lunch Program
- Nova Scotia Liberal Party
- Nova Scotia Light and Power

== See also ==
- Nova Scotia Lighthouse Preservation Society (NSLPS)
