= HMCS Clayoquot =

1940 Bangor-class minesweeper

Coordinates: 44°25′N 63°20′W

History

Canada
- Name: Clayoquot
- Namesake: Clayoquot Sound, British Columbia
- Ordered: 23 February 1940
- Builder: Prince Rupert Dry Dock and Shipyards Co. Prince Rupert, British Columbia
- Laid down: 20 June 1940
- Launched: 3 October 1940
- Commissioned: 22 August 1941
- Identification: Pennant number: J174
- Honours and awards: Atlantic 1942–44, Gulf of St. Lawrence 1942
- Fate: Torpedoed and sunk near Sambro, 24 December 1944

General characteristics
- Class & type: Bangor-class minesweeper
- Displacement: 672 long tons (683 t)
- Length: 180 ft (54.9 m) oa
- Beam: 28 ft 6 in (8.7 m)
- Draught: 9 ft 9 in (3.0 m)
- Propulsion: 2 Admiralty 3-drum water tube boilers, 2 shafts, vertical triple-expansion reciprocating engines, 2,400 ihp (1,790 kW)
- Speed: 16.5 knots (31 km/h)
- Complement: 83
- Armament: 1 × QF 4 in (102 mm)/40 cal Mk IV gun; 1 × QF 2-pounder Mark VIII; 2 × QF 20 mm Oerlikon guns; 40 depth charges as escort

HMCS Clayoquot was a Bangor-class minesweeper that served with the Royal Canadian Navy during the Second World War. She saw action mainly in the Battle of the Atlantic. She was sunk in 1944. The minesweeper was named after Clayoquot Sound on Vancouver Island, British Columbia.

== Design and description ==
A British design, the Bangor-class minesweepers were smaller than the preceding Halcyon-class minesweepers in British service, but larger than the Fundy class in Canadian service. They came in two versions powered by different engines; those with a diesel engines and those with vertical triple-expansion steam engines. Clayoquot was of the latter design and was larger than her diesel-engined cousins. Clayoquot was 180 feet (54.9 m) long overall, had a beam of 28 feet 6 inches (8.7 m) and a draught of 9 feet 9 inches (3.0 m). The minesweeper had a displacement of 672 long tons (683 t). She had a complement of 6 officers and 77 enlisted.

Clayoquot had two vertical triple-expansion steam engines, each driving one shaft, using steam provided by two Admiralty three-drum boilers. The engines produced a total of 2,400 indicated horsepower (1,800 kW) and gave a maximum speed of 16.5 knots (30.6 km/h; 19.0 mph). The minesweeper could carry a maximum of 150 long tons (152 t) of fuel oil.

Clayoquot was armed with a single quick-firing (QF) 4-inch (102 mm)/40 caliber Mk IV gun mounted forward. (Note: The 40 caliber denotes the length of the gun. This means that the length of the gun barrel is 40 times the bore diameter.) For anti-aircraft purposes, the minesweeper was equipped with one QF 2-pounder Mark VIII and two single-mounted QF 20 mm Oerlikon guns. As a convoy escort, Clayoquot was deployed with 40 depth charges launched from two depth charge throwers and four chutes.

== Construction and career ==
Ordered on 23 February 1940 as Esperanza, the ship was renamed Clayoquot in 1940. Clayoquot was laid down on 20 June 1940 by Prince Rupert Dry Dock and Shipyards Co. at Prince Rupert, British Columbia. The minesweeper was launched on 3 October 1940 and commissioned on 22 August 1941 at Prince Rupert.

She left Esquimalt, British Columbia after working up and made her way to Halifax, Nova Scotia where she arrived on 14 November 1941. Clayoquot was made part of Halifax Local Defence Force initially, though she was transferred to the Western Local Escort Force (WLEF) in March 1942. In May 1942 Clayoquot was assigned to the Gulf Escort Force. On 7 July, while responding to a U-boat attack on a convoy in the Gulf of St. Lawrence, Clayoquot came upon the abandoned hulk of the merchant vessel Dinaric, which had been torpedoed during the attack. Clayoquot sank the ship with gunfire and depth charges. On 10 September she was returning to Gaspé, Quebec after escorting a convoy to Rimouski with the corvette HMCS Charlottetown nearby when Charlottetown was hit by two torpedoes. Clayoquot searched for, but was unable to find the submarine. During depth charge attacks on possible targets, Clayoquot's radio was knocked out and prevented the ship from informing command of the corvette's loss. She returned to the site of the sinking and was able to rescue 55 survivors, taking at least three and a half hours to complete. (Note: Darlington and McKee state there is discrepancies in the number of survivors, claiming 57–58, with some dying of wounds after reaching shore-based medical treatment at Gaspé.) In October 1942 she joined Sydney Force.

On 29 December 1942 Clayoquot was sent for a major refit that took her from Halifax to Liverpool, Nova Scotia, to Pictou. The refit was completed in May 1943. After working up, she rejoined Sydney Force. In January 1944 she was assigned to HMCS Cornwallis as an officer training vessel for anti-submarine warfare. After ten months of training service, she was reassigned to Halifax Force.

=== Sinking ===
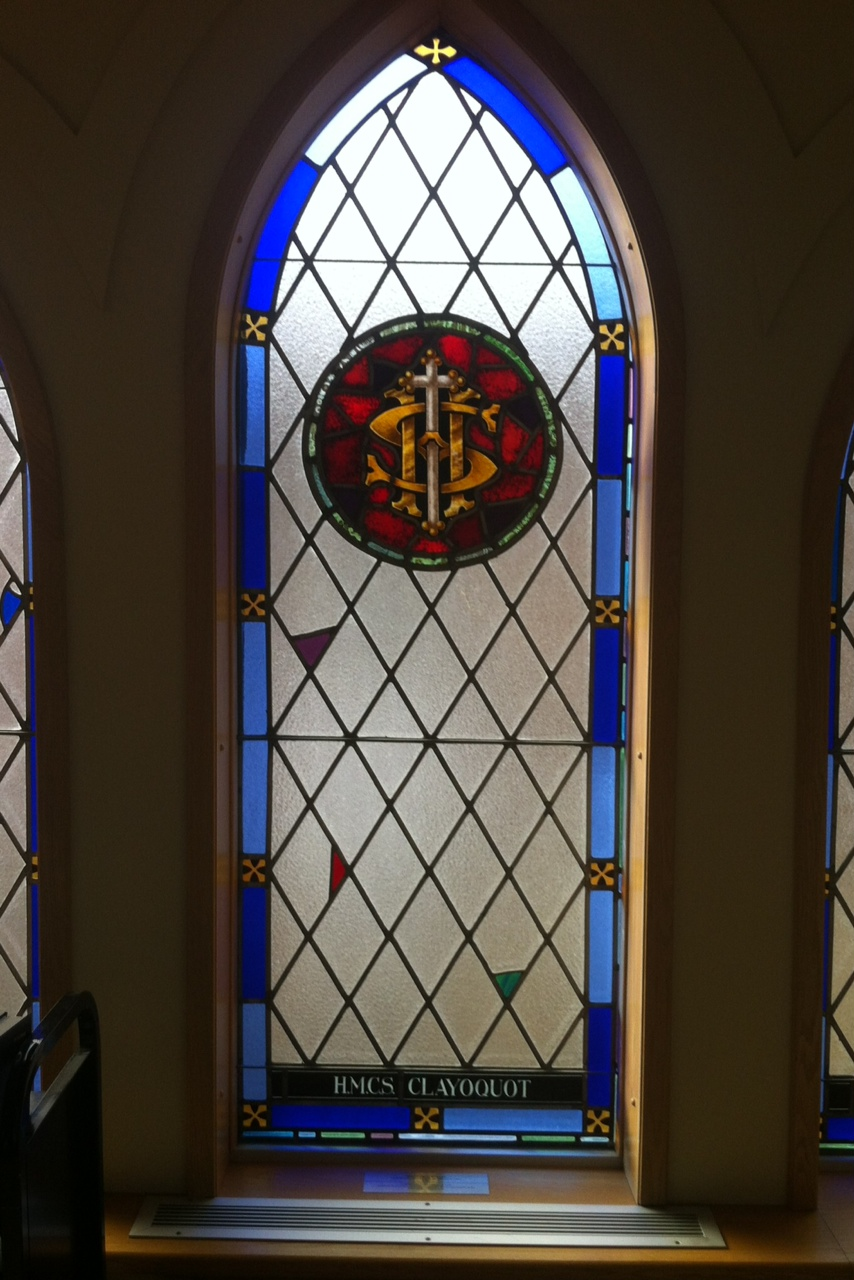
HMCS Clayoquot window at CFB Halifax

While sweeping for submarines near Sambro Island Light on 24 December 1944 in preparation to escort a convoy, Clayoquot was hit aft by a torpedo fired by U-806. She sank quickly and eight people died. There had not been enough time to disarm the depth charges kept ready, which detonated as the ship sank causing injuries among the surviving crew, which were picked up by the corvette Fennel. The frigate Kirkland Lake and sister ship Transcona which had been accompanying Clayoquot, were also targeted by the U-boat, but the torpedoes detonated before doing damage to the ships. A large search force was sent out to deal with the U-boat however they were not successful in finding the submarine.

== See also ==
- List of ships of the Canadian Navy
- History of the Royal Canadian Navy
- Military history of Nova Scotia
