= Clayoqua Indian Reserve No. 6 =

Clayoqua Indian Reserve 6 or Clayoqua 6 is an Indian Reserve in the Clayoquot Sound region of the West Coast of Vancouver Island of British Columbia, Canada.

== See also ==
- List of Indian reserves in British Columbia
- Clayoquot (disambiguation)
