= Sambro Island Light =

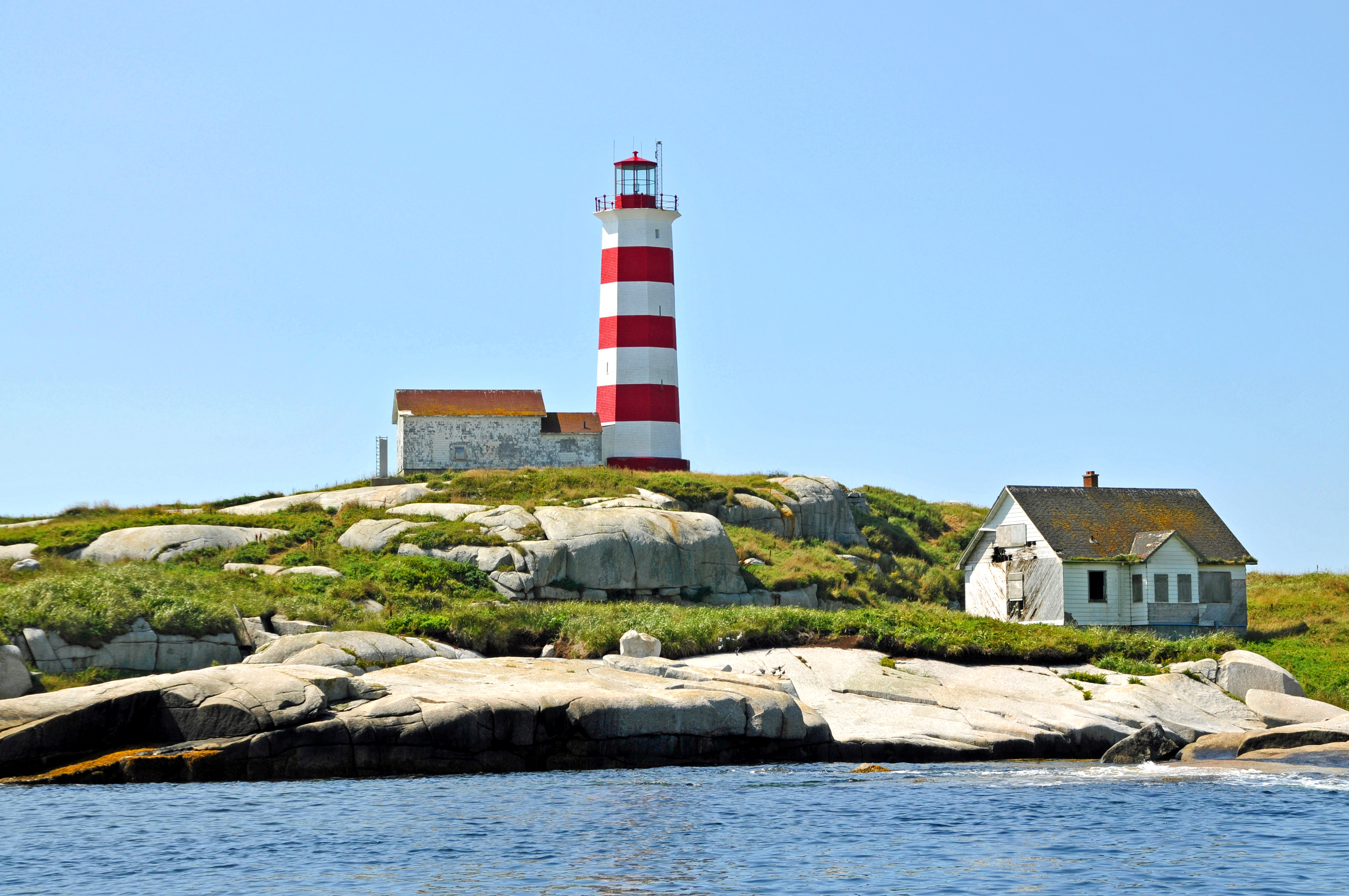
- Location: Sambro Island; Halifax; Nova Scotia
- Coordinates: 44°26′12.5″N 63°33′47.8″W

Tower
- Constructed: 1759
- Construction: stone sheathed with wood shingles
- Automated: 1988
- Height: 25 metres (82 ft)
- Shape: tapered octagonal tower
- Markings: white tower with three red horizontal bands, red lantern and trim
- Power source: solar power
- Operator: Canadian Coast Guard
- Heritage: classified federal heritage building of Canada

Light
- First lit: 1758
- Focal height: 43 metres (141 ft)
- Lens: rotating airport electric beacon
- Range: 24 nautical miles (44 km; 28 mi)
- Characteristic: Fl W 5s.

Sambro Island Lighthouse is a landfall lighthouse located at the entrance to Halifax Harbour, Nova Scotia, on an island near the community of Sambro in the Halifax Regional Municipality. It is the oldest surviving lighthouse in North America and its construction is a National Historic Event.

== History ==
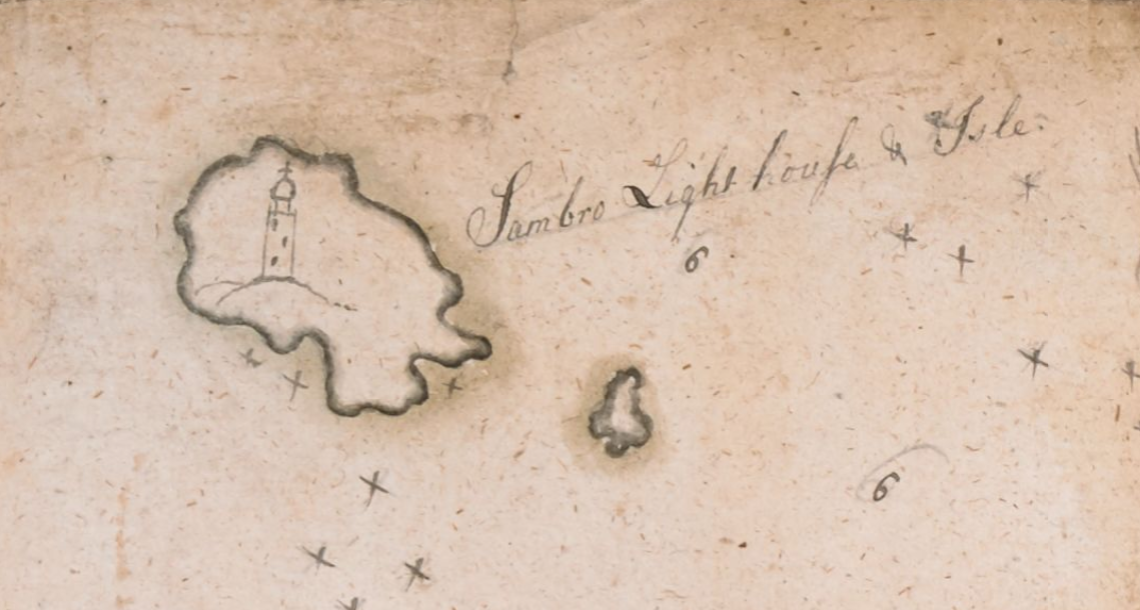
Sambro Light, earliest known image, (inset of A plan of Halifax Harbour in Nova Scotia, 1760 by R. A. Davenport)

The Sambro lighthouse was built during the Seven Years' War by the very first act passed by Nova Scotia's House of Assembly on October 2, 1758, which placed a tax on incoming vessels and alcohol imports to pay for the lighthouse. An earlier attempt by the colonial officials in 1752 to finance the lighthouse with a lottery was unsuccessful. With funding secured by the Assembly, construction began in the fall of 1758. Masonry work was completed by November 3, 1758 and a temporary light was first lit while construction continued. Construction was completed in 1759 and Joseph Rous (brother of Captain John Rous) was appointed as the first keeper. The lighthouse was automated in 1988. Cannons were used to provide fog warnings beginning in the late 18th century until the 1870s when a steam fog whistle was installed.

The island's location at the mouth of busy Halifax Harbour, surrounded by many rocks and shoals made it the setting of many shipwrecks over the years. One of the worst was the sinking of the liner SS Daniel Steinmann in 1884. Only nine people of the 130 aboard survived to be rescued by keepers of the lighthouse.

The lighthouse grew 22 feet higher in the fall of 1906, when the octagonal tower was extended by two extra stories. A new first order Fresnel lens from Barbier, Benard & Turenne in Paris was installed to complete the work in November 1906. Acetylene was first tested and then manufactured for the light in a specially constructed "gas house" in the cove below the lighthouse. Red stripes were added to the tower in 1908 to make the tower more visible against the snow. Sambro served as the departure point from North America for Joshua Slocum's famous solo navigation around the world in 1895. After an extended visit to his boyhood home at Brier Island and old haunts on the coast of Nova Scotia, Slocum departed on his around the world voyage from Sambro Island Lighthouse on July 3, 1895. "I watched light after light sink astern as I sailed into the unbounded sea, till Sambro, the last of them all, was below the horizon. The Spray was then alone..."

== Sea battles ==
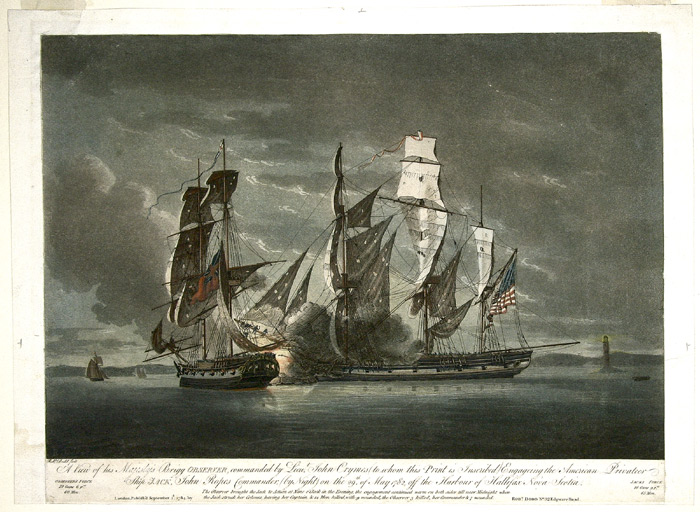
Naval battle off Halifax, 1782, (Sambro Light in background)

As the landfall light for the major strategic port of Halifax, Sambro has witnessed many shipwrecks and sea battles. A few months before the Battle of Halifax, in December 1779, The schooner Hope wrecked near the Sambro Island Light on the Three Sisters Rocks. Captain Henry Baldwin and six other crew were killed. Weeks later, 170 British sailors were lost when two vessels – the North and St. Helena – were wrecked in a storm when entering Halifax harbour.

During the American Revolution, in the Battle off Halifax (1780), the British privateer brig Resolution (16 guns) under the command of Thomas Ross engaged the American Privateer ship Viper (16 guns) off of Halifax at Sambro Light. Described as "one of the bloodiest battles in the history of privateering", the two privateers began a "severe engagement" during which both pounded each other with cannon fire for about 90 minutes. Resolution was eventually captured by the American Viper but at a cost of 33 American lives versus 18 aboard the Resolution.

Another battle during the American Revolution fought near the island was the 28–29 May 1782 Naval battle off Halifax, an engagement between the American privateer Jack and the British transport Observer. In a battle that lasted all night and into the next day, the 12-gun Observer captured the 14 gun Jack.

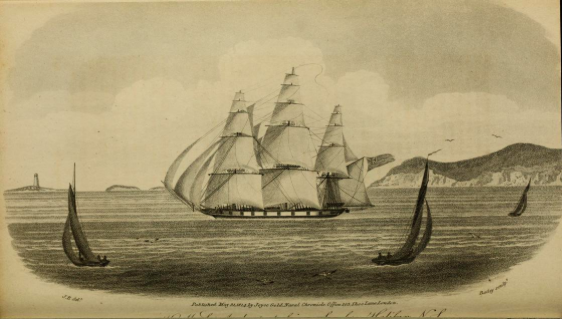
HMS Atalante passing Sambro Nova Scotia (1813)

On September 1, 1782, the American privateer Wasp sailed to Pennant Point, where they were confronted by three men from Sambro who fired on them, killing one of his crew and wounding three others, including Captain Thomas Thompson. Captain Perry took command of the vessel and the privateers took one of the Sambro men prisoner. The privateers buried their crew member on an island in Pennant bay. They then began their return to Massachusetts by rowing to West Dover, Nova Scotia, and then on to Cross Island ("Croo Island") just off Lunenburg ("Malegash").

During the War of 1812, the American privateer Young Teazer captured two vessels in May 1813 right off Sambro Island Light before the privateer was pursued and trapped by British warships near Chester, Nova Scotia, where Young Teazer was blown up with heavy loss of life to prevent capture.

In World War I and World War II, German submarines torpedoed a number of Allied ships near Sambro. On January 16, 1942, two 118 Squadron Curtiss Kittyhawk fighters on coastal patrol out of RCAF Station Dartmouth spotted and attacked a surfaced German U-boat approximately 10 miles off the coast near the Sambro Island light house. Flying Officer W.P. Roberts in Kittyhawk AK851 was able to fire six bursts and obtain a number of hits around the conning tower before the submarine dove underwater and disappeared from sight. Another example, while mine sweeping near Sambro Light Vessel on 24 December 1944 while preparing to escort a convoy, HMCS Clayoquot was hit by a torpedo aft fired by U-806. She sank quickly and eight lives were lost. A large search force was sent out to deal with the U-boat however they were not successful in finding it.

== Recent history ==
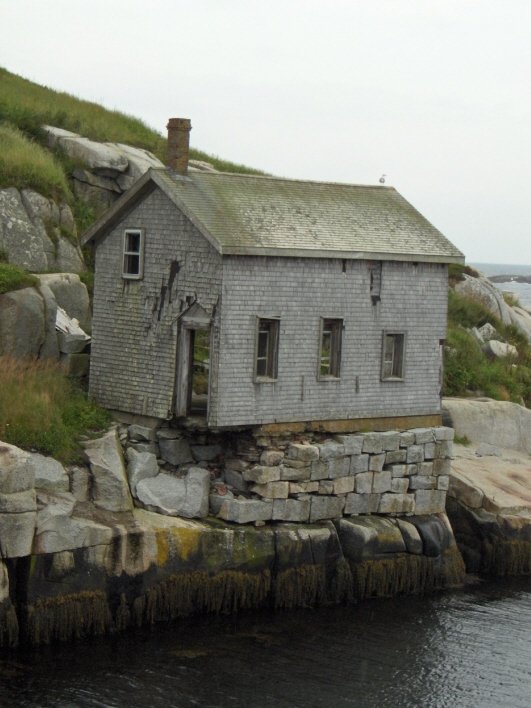
Sambro's crumbling Gas House, a registered federal heritage building

In 1966, the First Order Fresnel lens was replaced by a DCB rotating electrical beacon powered by an underwater electrical cable. The lens was supposed to be scrapped but was rescued and preserved by Niels Jannasch of the Maritime Museum of the Atlantic. The last lightkeepers at Sambro were J.G. Fairservice and Kelly Fairservice Brown. The lightstation was destaffed in 1988 and the island is now uninhabited. Just before the light was destaffed, the Sambro Island Light served as the setting for several memorable seafood commercials for National Sea Products featuring "Captain Highliner" portrayed by Canadian actor Bob Warner, which made the Captain Highliner persona a pop culture reference in Canada.

Of the three keeper's houses, built in the 1960s, one was demolished for salvage in 1989. Another was burned in 2007 and the third has been abandoned to the elements. The Nova Scotia Lighthouse Preservation Society has lobbied to protect the buildings on Sambro and succeeded in getting the tower declared as a Classified federal heritage building and the Gas House as a Recognized heritage building in 1996. Major repairs to the lighthouse followed in 1998 when the lighthouse was reshingled and repainted. In 2003, Hurricane Juan caused major damage to the Gas House. Despite the fact that it is a recognized federal building and donors have offered to assist in repairs, the Canadian Coast Guard has refused to repair the historic building. Many have accused the Canadian Coast Guard of essentially abandoning Canada's oldest lightstation to the elements, despite its historic status and proximity to Halifax. In addition to the unrepaired heritage gas house, the two keeper's dwellings have been left as gutted ruins. In October 2007, after the underwater cable supplying power to the island was damaged, the Canadian Coast Guard turned off the fog horn, ending over 200 years of fog warnings from the island with plans for a solar system with just enough power for the lighthouse beacon. The move triggered a protest move to protect the navigational role and heritage value of the light station. Mariners and heritage groups have petitioned the Coast Guard and the Nova Scotia House of Assembly passed a resolution in November 2007 labeling the neglect of the island as "a careless disregard for the nation's Maritime and its history of responsible government." In the wake of these concerns, an enlarged solar system was installed in the spring of 2008 with enough power to run both the light and a foghorn. The tower was also repainted. On August 16, 2008, the community of Sambro Harbour and the Nova Scotia Lighthouse Preservation Society celebrated the lighthouse's 250th birthday by bringing 150 people to the island for talks and tours. One of the derelict keeper's houses was destroyed by a suspicious fire on September 14, 2008, raising fears about the fate of the other neglected heritage structures on the island such as the Gas House.

== Location ==
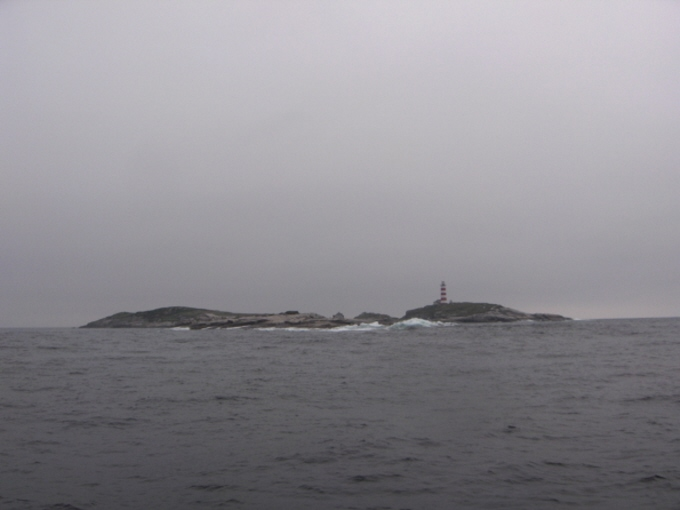
Sambro Island from the northwest (Crystal Crescent Beach)

The lighthouse is located at the summit of the half kilometre square Sambro Island. It is located on the western approaches to Halifax Harbour, about 6 kilometres (3.7 mi) southeast of Sambro Harbour. It is surrounded by a maze of dangerous shoals. The lighthouse and island are owned and maintained by the Canadian Coast Guard. In addition to the 18th century stone tower, the light station includes the endangered 19th century wooden building known as the Gas House as well as a fog horn shed which is in poor condition. Ruins on the island include the basement of one abandoned keeper's house, the burned out ruins of another and a partially dismantled keeper's dwelling, all from the 1960s. Several cannons used as fog signals can be found near the tower. A narrow sheltered cove runs into the centre of the island. The island is granite, covered by a thin layer of topsoil.

A unique geological formation, an intrusion dike, called "The Devil's Staircase" can be seen near the lighthouse. The massive First Order Fresnel Lens used at the lighthouse until 1968 can be seen at the Maritime Museum of the Atlantic in Halifax. Good views of the site are obtained from Crystal Crescent Beach and Sandy Cove near Ketch Harbour. The Canadian Coast Guard has discouraged regular tours of the island, but starting in 2008, the Nova Scotia Lighthouse Preservation Society and the community of Sambro presented day-long open house tours of the island once a year and a charter company run by a semi-retired local fisherman in Sambro Head began in 2008 to offer visits to the island by appointment.

== Commemoration ==
The Sambro lighthouse was declared a National Historic Event in 1937, marked by a plaque and cairn mounted beside the United Church in nearby Sambro Harbour. The First order Fresnel lens which operated at Sambro from 1906 until 1968 is displayed at the Maritime Museum of the Atlantic in Halifax, along with the DCB electrical beacon which lit the tower from 1968 until 2007. The tower was declared as a Classified federal heritage building and the Gas House was declared a Recognized heritage building in 1996. A $20 silver coin featuring the lighthouse was issued in 2004 by the Royal Canadian Mint. Canada Post announced a permanent stamp honouring the Sambro lighthouse in December 2007.

== Lighthouse keepers ==
- Joseph Rous (1758) (formerly of Cornwallis/ McNabs Island, brother of John Rous)

== See also ==
- List of oldest buildings in Canada
- List of lighthouses in Canada
- List of oldest buildings and structures in Halifax, Nova Scotia
- History of the Halifax Regional Municipality
