= Nova Scotia Lighthouse Preservation Society =

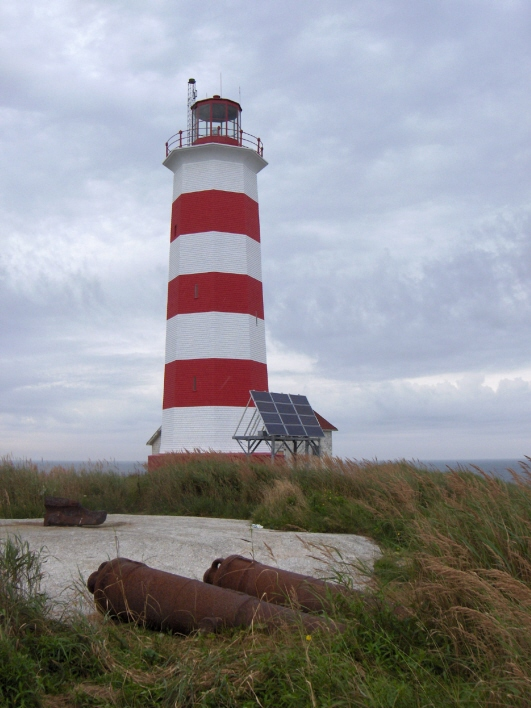
Sambro Island Light, which inspired the creation of the society in 1993

The Nova Scotia Lighthouse Preservation Society (NSLPS) is a non profit charitable organization that works to save lighthouses in the province of Nova Scotia, Canada. It is the largest and oldest lighthouse heritage organization in Canada. The society was formed in 1993 by a group of lighthouse supporters who met on a trip to Sambro Island Lighthouse, near Halifax, the oldest surviving lighthouse in North America. The society lists its goals as supporting the preservation and awareness of lighthouses, assisting community groups in leasing or taking ownership of lighthouses, developing research and acting as a watchdog on the state of lighthouses.

The society organizes regular lectures and trips to historic lighthouses. It also publishes a newsletter called The Lightkeeper. The society's accomplishments include winning heritage status for Sambro Island lighthouse, providing grants for lighthouse restoration, creating the Craig Harding Lighthouse Preservation Award, an oral history program and inspiring federal legislation which became the Heritage Lighthouse Protection Act. About twenty community groups and 200 individuals belong to the society. They meet in Halifax at the Maritime Museum of the Atlantic and co-sponsor many public events with the Museum.
