= Clayoquot Plateau Provincial Park =

Park in British Columbia, Canada

- IUCN category III (natural monument or feature)
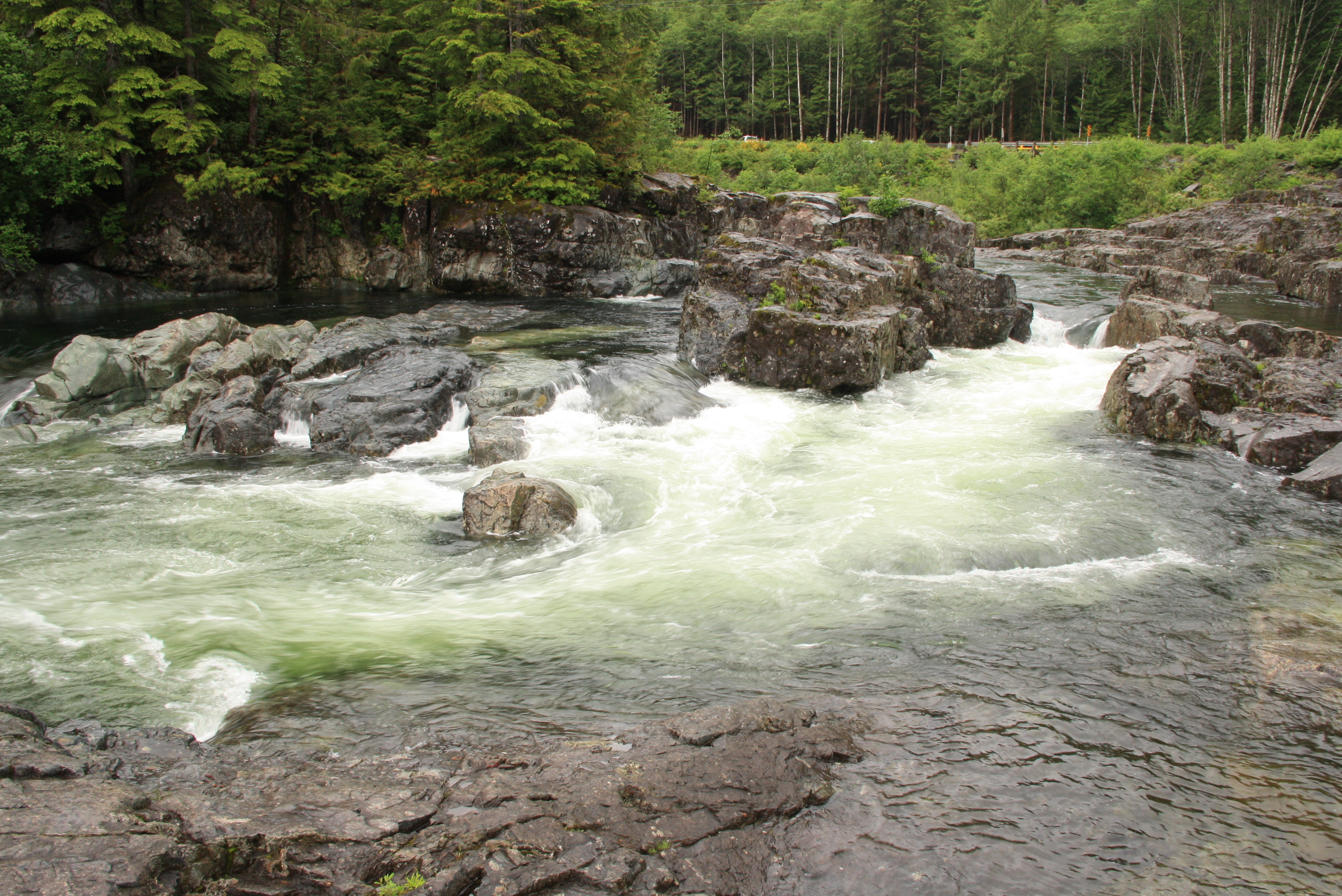

- Location within British Columbia
- Interactive map of Clayoquot Plateau Provincial Park
- Location: Alberni-Clayoquot RD, British Columbia
- Nearest city: Port Alberni
- Coordinates: 49°13′30″N 125°25′50″W
- Area: 3,155 ha (12.18 sq mi)
- Created: 12 July 1995
- Governing body: BC Parks

Clayoquot Plateau Provincial Park is a provincial park in British Columbia, Canada. It is located on the west side of the Kennedy River, to the northeast of the town of Tofino.

The park was established in 1995, comprising 3,155 hectares (7,800 acres). Its boundaries were revised in 2004, and the resulting area is approximately 3,132 hectares (7,740 acres), of which 3,125 hectares (7,720 acres) is upland and 7 hectares (17 acres) is foreshore.

== See also ==
- Clayoquot Arm Provincial Park
- Clayoquot Sound
