= German submarine U-806 =

German World War II submarine

History

Nazi Germany
- Name: U-806
- Ordered: 10 April 1941
- Builder: DeSchiMAG Seebeckwerft, Bremerhaven
- Yard number: 364
- Laid down: 27 April 1943
- Launched: 1943
- Commissioned: 29 April 1944
- Fate: Surrendered on 6 May 1945; Sunk as target on 21 December 1945 in position 55°44′N 8°18′W during Operation Deadlight

General characteristics
- Class & type: Type IXC/40 submarine
- Displacement: 1,144 t (1,126 long tons) surfaced; 1,257 t (1,237 long tons) submerged
- Length: 76.76 m (251 ft 10 in) o/a; 58.75 m (192 ft 9 in) pressure hull
- Beam: 6.86 m (22 ft 6 in) o/a; 4.44 m (14 ft 7 in) pressure hull
- Height: 9.60 m (31 ft 6 in)
- Draught: 4.67 m (15 ft 4 in)
- Installed power: 2 × shafts; 4,400 PS (4,340 shp; 3,236 kW) (diesels); 1,000 PS (986 shp; 735 kW) (electric)
- Propulsion: 2 × diesel engines; 2 × double-acting electric motors
- Speed: 19 knots (35 km/h; 22 mph) surfaced; 7.3 knots (13.5 km/h; 8.4 mph) submerged
- Range: 13,850 nmi (25,650 km; 15,940 mi) at 10 knots (19 km/h; 12 mph) surfaced; 63 nmi (117 km; 72 mi) at 4 knots (7.4 km/h; 4.6 mph) submerged
- Test depth: 230 m (750 ft)
- Complement: 4 officers, 44 enlisted
- Sensors & processing systems: FuG 200 Hohentwiel
- Armament: 6 × torpedo tubes (four bow, two stern); 22 × 53.3 cm (21 in) torpedoes; anti-aircraft guns´

Service record
- Part of: 4th U-boat Flotilla; 29 April – 31 October 1944; 33rd U-boat Flotilla; 1 November 1944 – 6 May 1945
- Identification codes: M 17 549
- Commanders: Kptlt. Klaus Hornbostel; 29 April 1944 – 6 May 1945
- Operations: 1 patrol: a. 30 October 1944 – 21 February 1945; b. 25 – 27 February 1945
- Victories: 1 warship sunk (672 tons); 1 merchant ship damaged (7,219 GRT)

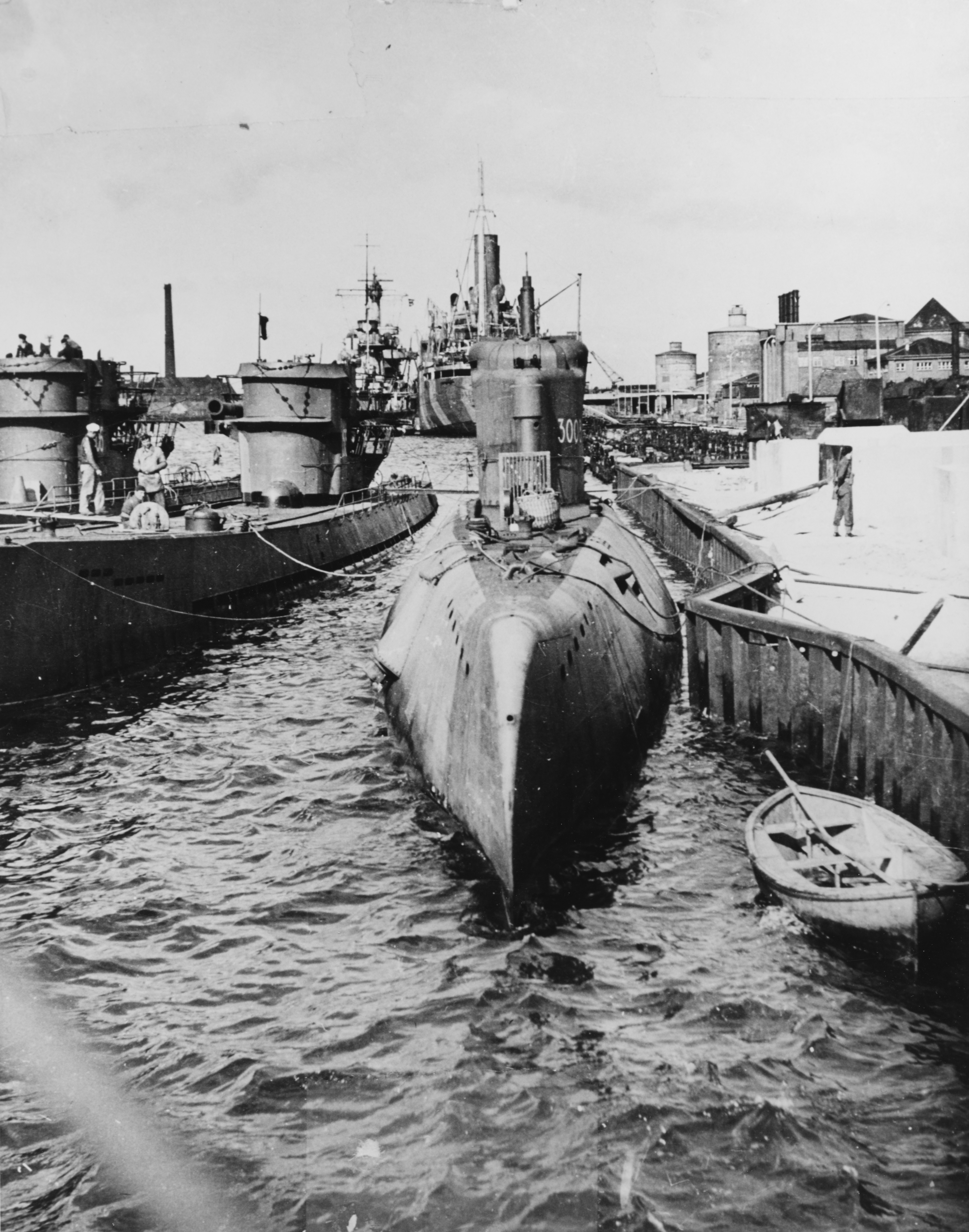
Type IX submarines U-806 (seen far left) and U-155

German submarine U-806 was a Type IXC/40 U-boat built for Nazi Germany's Kriegsmarine during World War II.

U-801 was ordered on 10 April 1941 from DeSchiMAG Seebeckwerft in Geestemünde under the yard number 364. Her keel was laid down on 27 April 1943 and the U-boat was launched sometime late in 1943. On 29 April 1944 she was commissioned into service under the command of Kapitänleutnant Klaus Hornbostel (Crew 34) in the 4th U-boat Flotilla.

== Design ==
German Type IXC/40 submarines were slightly larger than the original Type IXCs. U-806 had a displacement of 1,144 tonnes (1,126 long tons) when at the surface and 1,257 tonnes (1,237 long tons) while submerged. The U-boat had a total length of 76.76 m (251 ft 10 in), a pressure hull length of 58.75 m (192 ft 9 in), a beam of 6.86 m (22 ft 6 in), a height of 9.60 m (31 ft 6 in), and a draught of 4.67 m (15 ft 4 in). The submarine was powered by two MAN M 9 V 40/46 supercharged four-stroke, nine-cylinder diesel engines producing a total of 4,400 metric horsepower (3,240 kW; 4,340 shp) for use while surfaced, two Siemens-Schuckert 2 GU 345/34 double-acting electric motors producing a total of 1,000 shaft horsepower (1,010 PS; 750 kW) for use while submerged. She had two shafts and two 1.92 m (6 ft) propellers. The boat was capable of operating at depths of up to 230 metres (750 ft).

The submarine had a maximum surface speed of 18.3 knots (33.9 km/h; 21.1 mph) and a maximum submerged speed of 7.3 knots (13.5 km/h; 8.4 mph). When submerged, the boat could operate for 63 nautical miles (117 km; 72 mi) at 4 knots (7.4 km/h; 4.6 mph); when surfaced, she could travel 13,850 nautical miles (25,650 km; 15,940 mi) at 10 knots (19 km/h; 12 mph). U-806 was fitted with six 53.3 cm (21 in) torpedo tubes (four fitted at the bow and two at the stern), 22 torpedoes, and a 3.7 cm (1.5 in) Flak M42 as well as two twin 2 cm (0.79 in) C/30 anti-aircraft guns. The boat had a complement of forty-eight.

== Service history ==
After work up for deployment in the Baltic Sea, U-806 transferred to the 33rd U-boat Flotilla for front-line service on 1 November 1944. She left Kiel for her first - and only - war patrol on 30 October. On the way to her assigned operational area off Canada she stopped at Horten Naval Base and Kristiansand. While operating against convoy HX 327 in late December 1944, U-806 sank two ships, the British steamer Samtucky of 7,219 GRT, and the Canadian escort HMCS Clayoquot on 21 and 24 December respectively. An attack on another Canadian escort, HMCS Transcona, failed.

Two months later, U-806 returned to base via Norway, arriving in Flensburg on 27 February 1945. Spending the rest of the war in training, U-806 ran aground on Hatter Reef on 5 May 1945 and had to be towed free by a tug the next day. She arrived in Aarhus later that day in order to surrender to the Allies.

On 22 June 1945 the U-boat was transferred to Loch Ryan via Fredericia, Kiel, and Wilhelmshaven, arriving in Scotland on 26 June. On 21 December 1945, as part of Operation Deadlight, U-806 left Loch Ryan under tow from HMS Masterful to be sunk by ORP Błyskawica by artillery.

== Summary of raiding history ==
Date	Ship Name	Nationality	Tonnage (Note: Merchant ship tonnages are in gross register tons. Military vessels are listed by tons displacement.)	Fate
21 December 1944	Samtucky	United Kingdom	7,219	Damaged
24 December 1944	HMCS Clayoquot	Royal Canadian Navy	672	Sunk

== Bibliography ==
- Busch, Rainer; Röll, Hans-Joachim (1999). German U-boat commanders of World War II : a biographical dictionary. Translated by Brooks, Geoffrey. London, Annapolis, Md: Greenhill Books, Naval Institute Press. ISBN 1-55750-186-6.
- Busch, Rainer; Röll, Hans-Joachim (1999). Der U-Boot-Krieg, 1939-1945: Deutsche U-Boot-Verluste von September 1939 bis Mai 1945 [German U-boat losses from September 1939 to May 1945] (in German). Vol. IV. Hamburg, Berlin, Bonn: Mittler. ISBN 3-8132-0514-2.
- Gröner, Eric; Jung, Dieter; Maass, Martin (1991). German Warships 1815-1945: U-boats and Mine Warfare Vessels. Vol. 2. Translated by Thomas, Keith; Magowan, Rachel. London: Conway Maritime Press. ISBN 0-85177-593-4.
