= Clayoquot Sound =

Body of water on the west side of Vancouver Island, Canada

- French: Baie Clayoquot
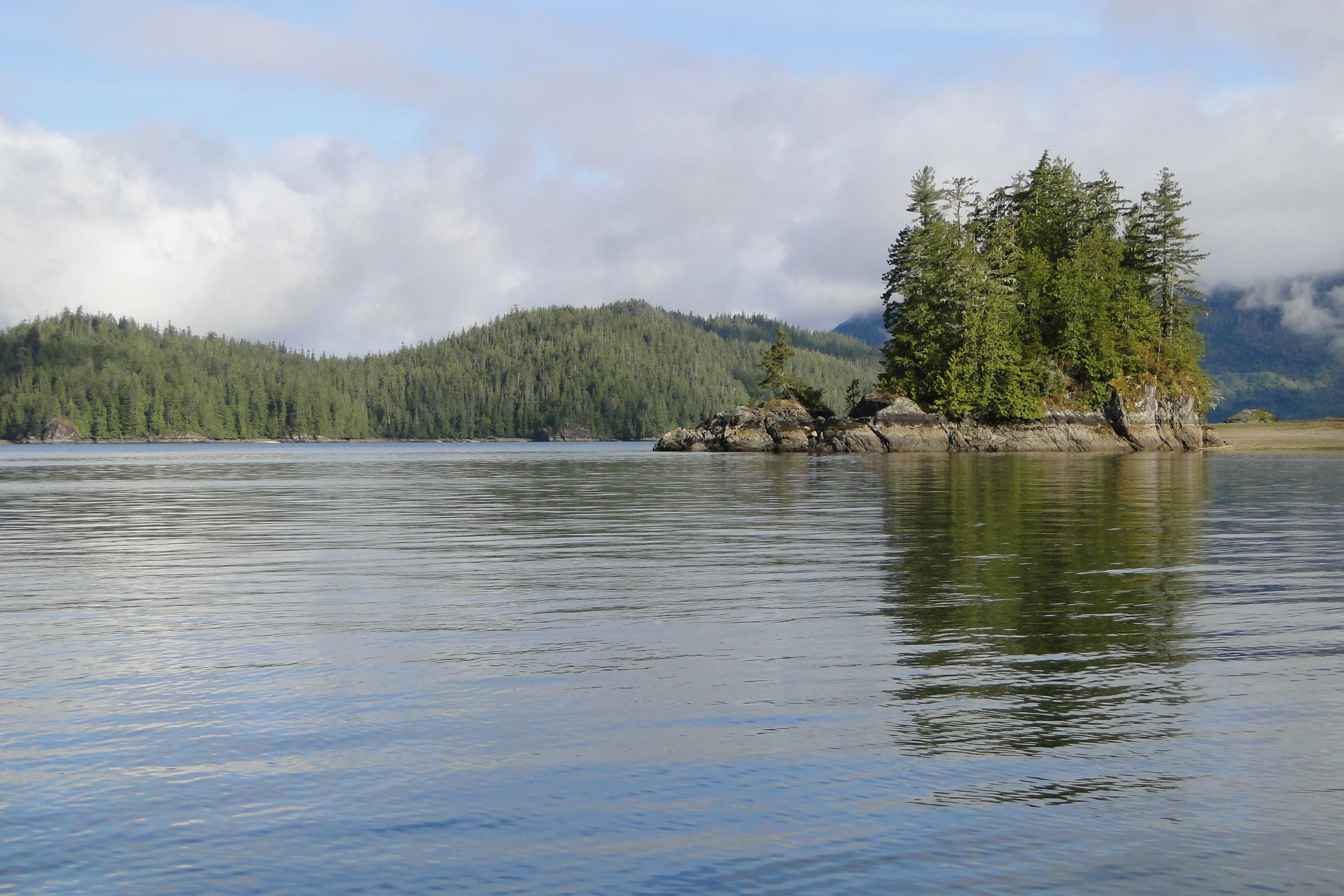

- Location within British Columbia

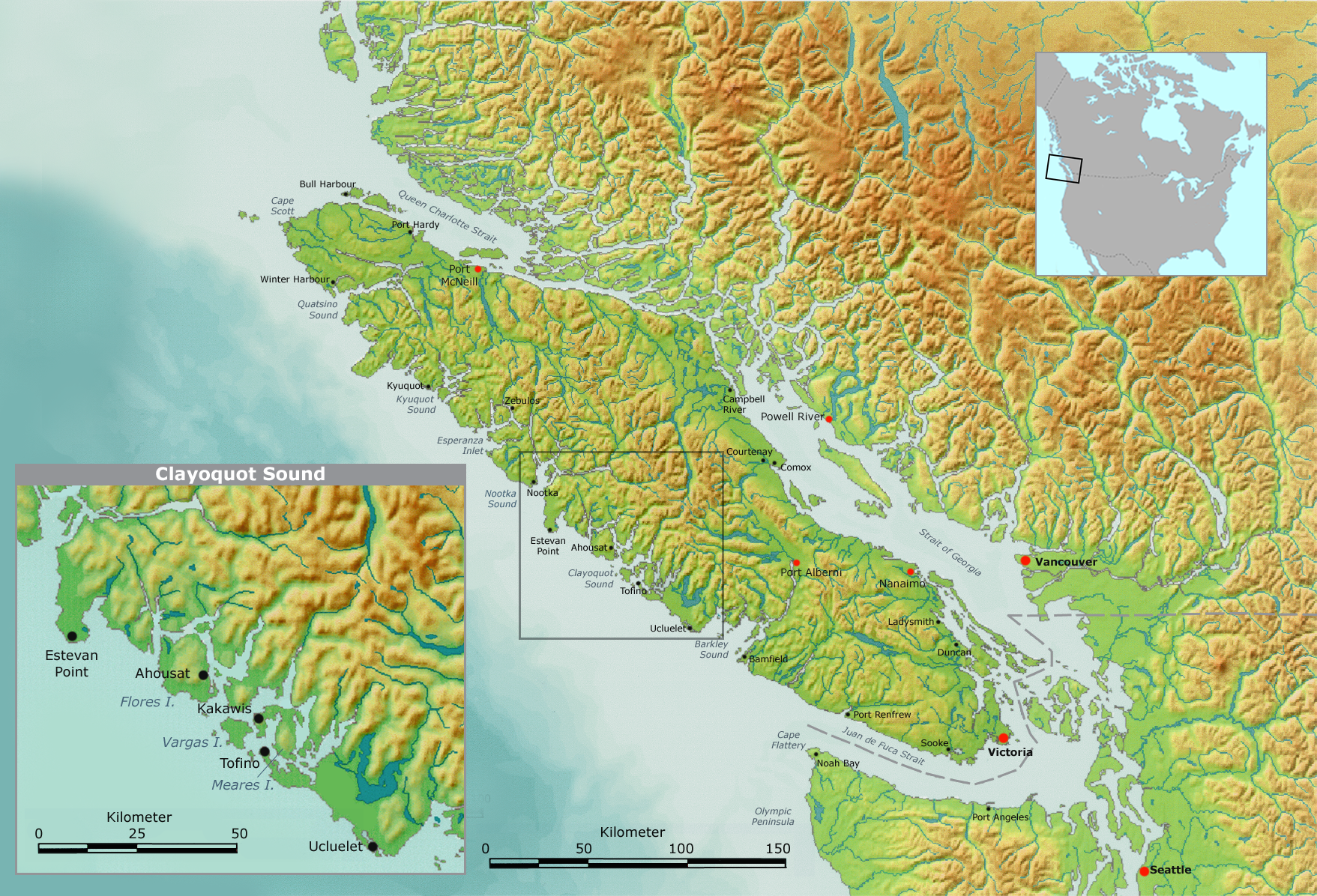
- Map of Vancouver Island with inset of Clayoquot Sound region
- Location: Vancouver Island, British Columbia
- Coordinates: 49°12′00″N 126°06′00″W
- Type: Sound
- Ocean/sea sources: Pacific Ocean

Clayoquot Sound /ˈklɑːkwɒt/ is located on the west coast of Vancouver Island in the Canadian province of British Columbia. It is bordered by the Esowista Peninsula to the south, and the Hesquiaht Peninsula to the North. It is a body of water with many inlets and islands. Major inlets include Sydney Inlet, Shelter Inlet, Herbert Inlet, Bedwell Inlet, Lemmens Inlet, and Tofino Inlet. Major islands include Flores Island, Vargas Island, and Meares Island. The name is also used for the larger region of land around the waterbody (essentially its watershed).

== Origin of the name ==
The name Clayoquot is derived from the name of a subgroup of the Nuu-chah-nulth, who lived at Clayoqua. In the late 20th century, this group merged into the multi-group band government known as the Tla-o-qui-aht (ƛaʔuukʷiʔatḥ), meaning "different" or "changing" in their language.

== History ==
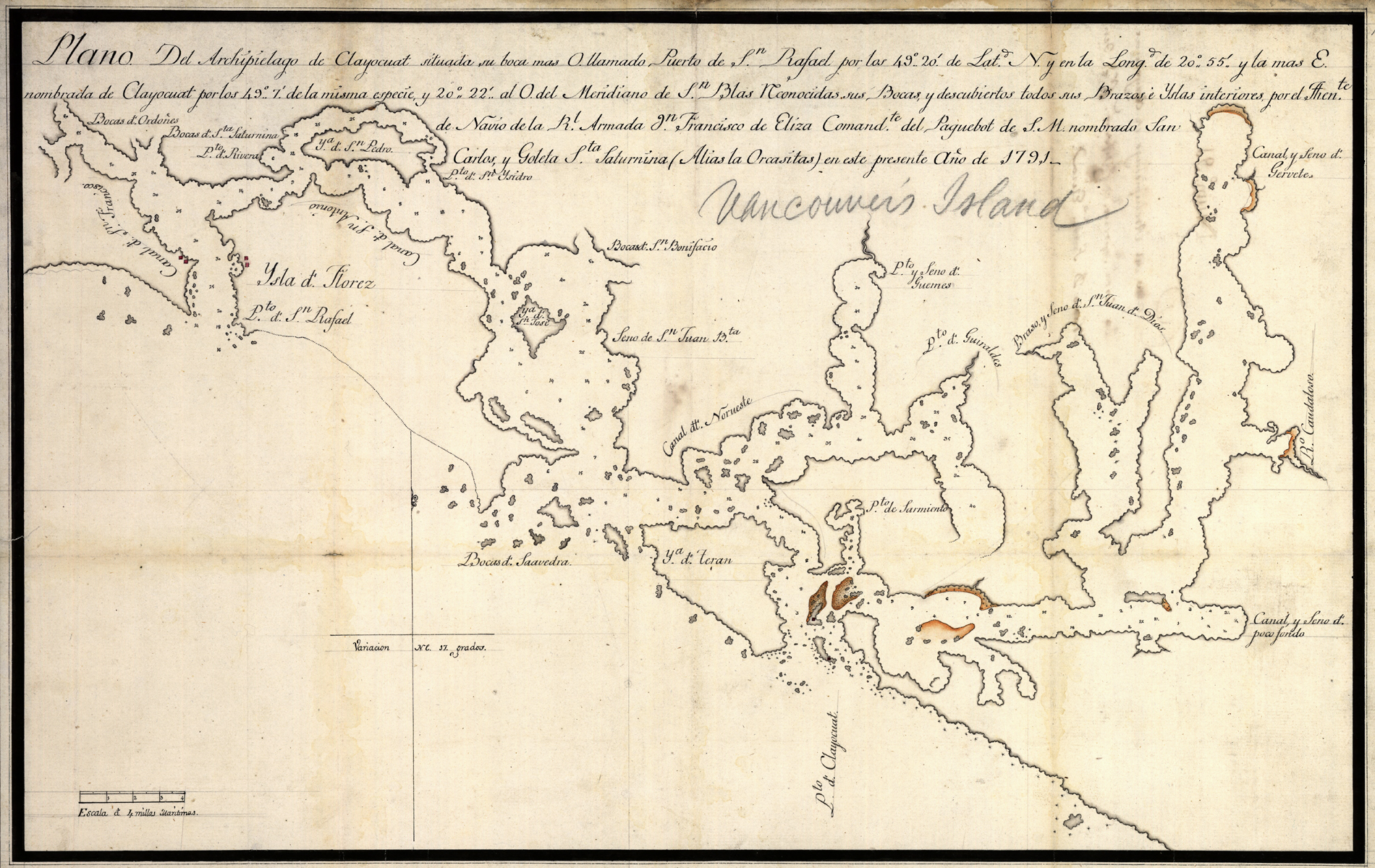
Spanish map of Clayoquot Sound made during the 1791 exploration voyage of Francisco de Eliza

First Nations have inhabited the area for thousands of years. The oldest dated location within Nuu-cha-nulth territory is 4,200 years (at Yuquot, Nootka Island). Because post-glacial sea-levels are known to have risen, overtaking earlier locations, most scholars will date the beginnings of human habitation beyond 9,000 years BP before present.

In the late 18th century, Clayoquot Sound and the Native American peoples were explored by ship by various Europeans and Americans who were involved mainly in the fur trade. In 1791, the complex inner waters were explored and mapped by José María Narváez and Juan Carrasco; their commander, Francisco de Eliza, met and befriended Wickaninnish, the chief of the Tla-o-qui-aht peoples.

These explorers recognized the region's wealth of natural resources. These resources attracted growing numbers of non-First Nations peoples, who limited First Nation access to land, and generated resentment among the locals. Government support of private company resource extraction allowed for the growth of such industry over time. Logging companies were active in harvesting timber in the Clayoquot Sound area as late as the 1980s and 1990s.

=== Logging protests ===
In the late 20th century, First Nations became more active in trying to defend their rights and resources. They developed Native lobbying organizations and insisted on negotiations regarding governmental policies about such resources. In the late 1980s, the situation escalated when the government approved MacMillan Bloedel Corporation's permit to log Meares Island.

The First Nations peoples expressed their opposition to the MacMillan Bloedel Corporation logging in the Clayoquot Sound by several peaceful protests and blockades of logging roads from 1980 to 1994. In the summer of 1993, over 800 protestors were arrested, and many were tried for interfering with approved industry. Protestors included members of the local Tla-o-qui-aht First Nation and Ahousaht First Nation bands, as well as New Democratic Party Minister of Parliament Svend Robinson, and environmental groups such as Greenpeace and Friends of Clayoquot Sound.

International mass media covered the protests and blockades, helping to create national support for environmental movements in British Columbia and foster strong advocacy for anti-logging campaigns. Media reported the perceived injustice of numerous individuals being arrested for joining peaceful protests and blockades. In some cases, law enforcement responded aggressively, which eventually helped strengthen public support for non-violent protests.

After the 1990 protests, the provincial government made its first significant change in policy. It commissioned a scientific panel to examine issues related to Clayoquot Sound. In July 1995, the Forests Minister of British Columbia, Andrew Petter, and the Environment Minister, Elizabeth Cull, officially accepted the 127 panel recommendations, on behalf of the NDP government.

Members of Greenpeace were reported to play a significant role in these protests and instigated a boycott of BC forest products to apply pressure on the industry. After the government accepted the scientific panel's recommendations, specifically deferring logging until an inventory of pristine areas was completed, Greenpeace lifted the boycott. After the inventory, the government reduced the Annual Allowable Cut, and clear-cuts in the area were limited to a maximum of four hectares. In addition, once biological and cultural inventories were completed, the government required Eco-Based Planning.

=== Salmon farming and related controversy ===
The sound's ecological features have made it a major site for the farming of salmon, a fish traditional to this area. Floating feedlots have been installed, consisting of giant fenced pens. There are roughly twenty such farms in operation. A massive die-off of fish, possibly linked to an algal bloom caused by the intensive farming operation, occurred in 2019.

The densely packed farms have the disadvantage of providing conditions that allow for the rapid spread of disease. A highly contagious virus variant found in Norwegian salmon farms has been found in Clayoquot Sound farmed salmon. Environmental advocacy organizations have stated such events are evidence of the environmental damage associated with this type of fish farming. The British Columbia provincial government has closed other salmon farming sites on Vancouver Island. For instance, it is phasing out salmon farms by 2022 in the Discovery Islands on Vancouver Island's east side.

== Indigenous peoples and governments ==
The members of three major First Nations band governments of the Nuu-chah-nulth peoples inhabit the Clayoquot Sound: the Hesquiaht in the North, the Ahousaht in the middle, and the Tla-o-qui-aht in the south. The latter group is based in the village of Opitsaht on Meares Island. The village of Tofino lies opposite Opitsaht on the southern promontory of the entrance to the sound.

In 1985, for the first time in British Columbia history, the courts froze resource development on crown land because of a related Aboriginal title claim. Chiefs of the Ahousaht and Tla-o-qui-aht first nations obtained an injunction halting logging on Meares Island in Clayoquot Sound pending treaty negotiations with the provincial government. These negotiations resulted in the provincial government and Nuu-chah-nulth first nations signing the Interim Measures Act (IMA) on March 19, 1994. (This followed protests in 1993 that gained international coverage on this issue, increasing the pressure.) Since the IMA was signed, the First Nations and government have negotiated to co-manage local land and resources, including economic development strategies.

With the reduction in logging in this area, in the early 21st century, the communities surrounding Clayoquot Sound (Tofino, Ucluelet, and Ahousaht) have been developing new sources of income. They are emphasizing ecotourism and selective logging, based on co-management strategies.

== Ecology, parks and terrain ==
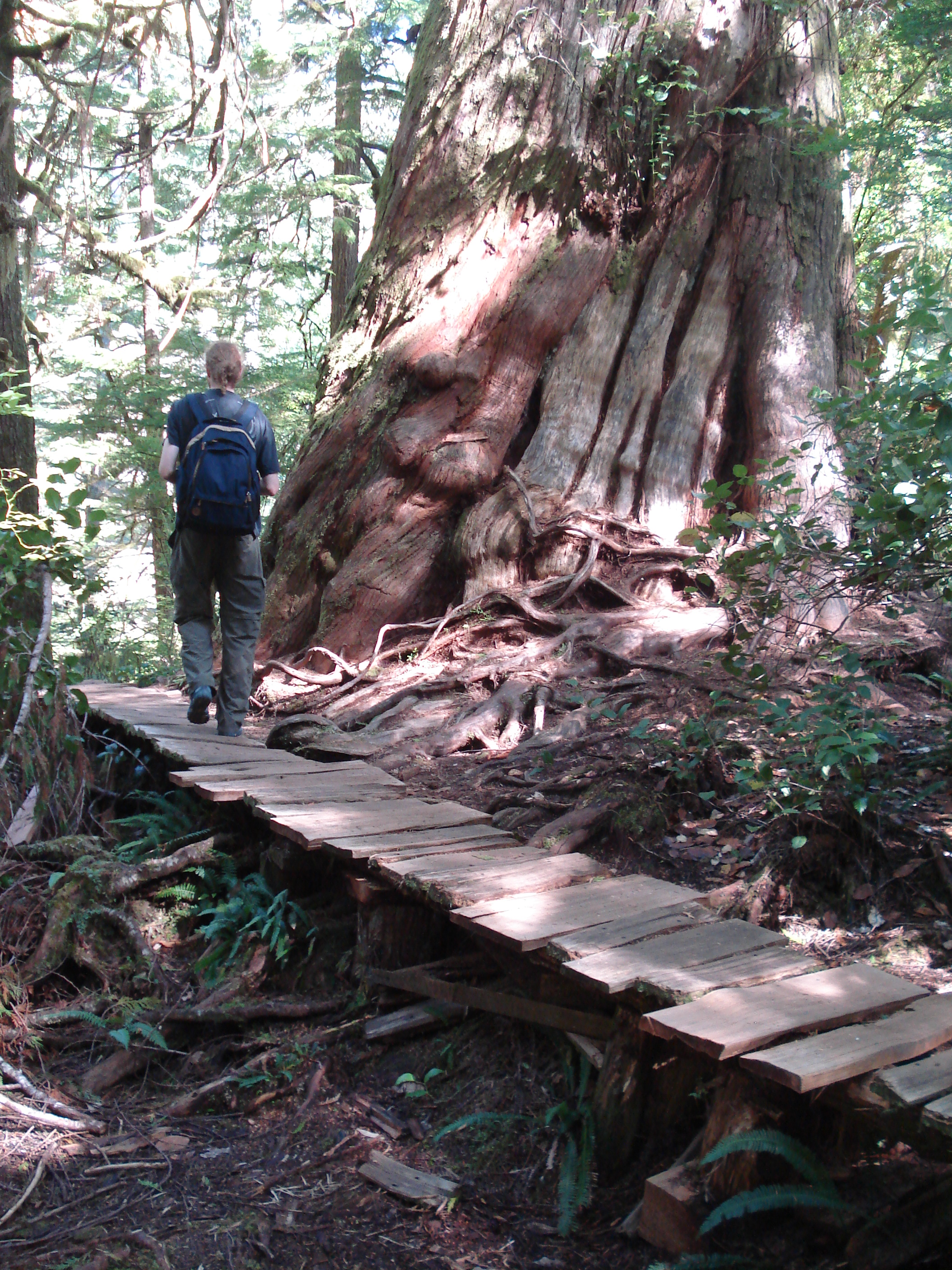
A giant cedar on Meares Island in Clayoquot Sound

The land around Clayoquot Sound includes vast coastal temperate rain forest, rivers, lakes, marine areas and beaches. It includes part of the Pacific Rim National Park Reserve and some of Strathcona Provincial Park. The total size of the Clayoquot Sound region, including both land and water, is 350,000 hectares (860,000 acres).

More than 200,000 hectares (490,000 acres) have been included as the subject of a multi-year study using Terrestrial Ecosystem Mapping (TEM) to identify areas prone to geologic and geomorphic hazards, in particular, landslides, soil erosion, and sedimentation. The study is also to identify and characterize terrain conditions associated with these hazards. The region contains the largest area of intact (unlogged) temperate rainforest left on Vancouver Island.

Clayoquot Sound is home to Vancouver Island wolves, black bears, cougars, grey whales, orcas, porpoises, seals, sea lions, river otters, bald eagles, osprey, marbled murrelets, Pacific loons, Roosevelt elk, American martens, and raccoons.

In 2000, Clayoquot Sound Biosphere Reserve was designated as a Biosphere Reserve by UNESCO. The designation created world recognition of Clayoquot Sound's biological diversity, and a $12M monetary fund to "support research, education and training in the Biosphere region".

At the end of July 2006, a new set of Watershed Plans was approved for Clayoquot Sound. This enabled logging in some 10,000 hectares (25,000 acres) of the forest, including pristine old-growth valleys. As of 2007, both logging tenures within Clayoquot Sound are controlled by aboriginal-owned logging companies Iisaak Forest Resources controls Timber Forest License (TFL) 57 in Clayoquot Sound, and MaMook Natural Resources Ltd, in conjunction with Coulson Forest Products, manages TFL54 in Clayoquot Sound.

== See also ==
- Kennedy Lake
- Cougar Annie
- Clayoquot Arm Provincial Park
- Clayoquot Plateau Provincial Park
- Great Bear Rainforest
