= Clayoquot Arm Provincial Park =

Provincial park in British Columbia, Canada

- IUCN category II (national park)
- Location within British Columbia
- Interactive map of Clayoquot Arm Provincial Park
- Location: Alberni-Clayoquot RD, British Columbia
- Nearest city: Port Alberni
- Coordinates: 49°10′40″N 125°34′00″W
- Area: 3,491 ha (13.48 sq mi)
- Created: 12 July 1995
- Governing body: BC Parks

Clayoquot Arm Provincial Park is a provincial park in British Columbia, Canada.

== See also ==
- Clayoquot Plateau Provincial Park
- Clayoquot Sound

== Bibliography ==
- "Clayoquot Arm Park". BC Geographical Names. Government of British Columbia – B.C. Geographical Names Office (BCGNO).
