= HMCS Kirkland Lake =

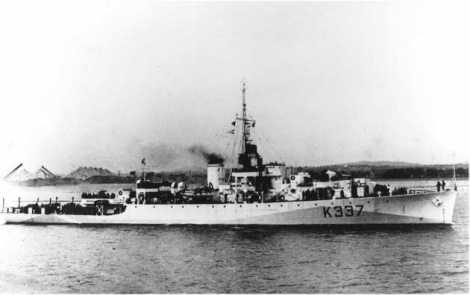
- HMCS Kirkland Lake

History

Canada
- Name: Kirkland Lake
- Namesake: Kirkland Lake, Ontario
- Operator: Royal Canadian Navy
- Ordered: June 1942
- Builder: Morton Engineering & Dry Dock Co., Quebec City
- Laid down: 16 November 1943
- Launched: 27 April 1944
- Commissioned: 21 August 1944
- Decommissioned: 14 December 1945
- Identification: Pennant number: K 337
- Fate: Sold, scrapped 1947

General characteristics
- Class & type: River-class frigate
- Displacement: 1,445 long tons (1,468 t; 1,618 short tons); 2,110 long tons (2,140 t; 2,360 short tons) (deep load)
- Length: 283 ft (86.26 m) p/p; 301.25 ft (91.82 m) o/a
- Beam: 36.5 ft (11.13 m)
- Draught: 9 ft (2.74 m); 13 ft (3.96 m) (deep load)
- Propulsion: 2 x Admiralty 3-drum boilers, 2 shafts, reciprocating vertical triple expansion, 5,500 ihp (4,100 kW)
- Speed: 20 knots (37.0 km/h); 20.5 knots (38.0 km/h) (turbine ships)
- Range: 646 long tons (656 t; 724 short tons) oil fuel; 7,500 nautical miles (13,890 km) at 15 knots (27.8 km/h)
- Complement: 157
- Armament: 2 × QF 4 in (102 mm) /45 Mk. XVI on twin mount HA/LA Mk.XIX; 1 × QF 12 pdr (3 in (76 mm)) 12 cwt /40 Mk. V on mounting HA/LA Mk.IX (not all ships); 8 × 20 mm QF Oerlikon A/A on twin mounts Mk.V; 1 × Hedgehog 24 spigot A/S projector; up to 150 depth charges

HMCS Kirkland Lake was a River-class frigate that served with the Royal Canadian Navy during the Second World War. She served primarily as a convoy escort in the Battle of the Atlantic. She was named for Kirkland Lake, Ontario.

Originally named St. Jerome, she was ordered in June 1942 as part of the 1942–1943 River-class building program. She was laid down on 16 November 1943 by Morton Engineering & Dry Dock Co. at Quebec City and launched 27 April 1944. Her name was changed to Kirkland Lake and she was commissioned into the Royal Canadian Navy on 21 August 1944 at Quebec City.

== Background ==
The River-class frigate was designed by William Reed of Smith's Dock Company of South Bank-on-Tees. Originally called a "twin-screw corvette", its purpose was to improve on the convoy escort classes in service with the Royal Navy at the time, including the Flower-class corvette. The first orders were placed by the Royal Navy in 1940 and the vessels were named for rivers in the United Kingdom, giving name to the class. In Canada they were named for towns and cities though they kept the same designation. The name "frigate" was suggested by Vice-Admiral Percy Nelles of the Royal Canadian Navy and was adopted later that year.

Improvements over the corvette design included improved accommodation which was markedly better. The twin engines gave only three more knots of speed but extended the range of the ship to nearly double that of a corvette at 7,200 nautical miles (13,300 km) at 12 knots. Among other lessons applied to the design was an armament package better designed to combat U-boats including a twin 4-inch mount forward and 12-pounder aft. 15 Canadian frigates were initially fitted with a single 4-inch gun forward but with the exception of HMCS Valleyfield, they were all eventually upgraded to the double mount. For underwater targets, the River-class frigate was equipped with a Hedgehog anti-submarine mortar and depth charge rails aft and four side-mounted throwers.

River-class frigates were the first Royal Canadian Navy warships to carry the 147B Sword horizontal fan echo sonar transmitter in addition to the irregular ASDIC. This allowed the ship to maintain contact with targets even while firing unless a target was struck. Improved radar and direction-finding equipment improved the RCN's ability to find and track enemy submarines over the previous classes.

Canada originally ordered the construction of 33 frigates in October 1941. The design was too big for the shipyards on the Great Lakes so all the frigates built in Canada were built in dockyards along the west coast or along the St. Lawrence River. In all Canada ordered the construction of 60 frigates including ten for the Royal Navy that transferred two to the United States Navy.

== War service ==
After working up in Bermuda in November 1944, Kirkland Lake was assigned to escort group EG 16 based out of Derry. She spent various periods based out of Portsmouth and Derry, escorting convoys to Gibraltar in May 1945. She returned to Canada in June 1945 to undergo a tropicalization refit in preparation for service in the southern Pacific Ocean. This meant installing water-cooling and refrigeration abilities and changing the camouflage pattern. The refit was done at Quebec City and completed 5 November 1945. By this time, Japan had surrendered and the war was over.

Kirkland Lake was paid off 14 December 1945 at Halifax and laid up in Bedford Basin. She was sold in 1947 for disposal and taken to Sydney, Nova Scotia to be broken up.
