= Clayoquot, British Columbia =

Ghost town in British Columbia

Coordinates: 49°10′00″N 125°56′00″W

Clayoquot is a virtual ghost town on the west coast of central Vancouver Island, British Columbia. The former steamboat landing is about 1.5 kilometres (0.9 mi) by boat northwest of Tofino, which is by road about 172 kilometres (107 mi) west of Parksville, at the terminus of BC Highway 4.

== Name origin ==
The island was named by Captain Napoleon Fitz Stubbs, who circumnavigated Vancouver Island in 1861.

Clayoquot /ˈklækwɒt/ became the accepted anglicization of the Nuu-chah-nulth name "Tla-o-qui-aht", an indigenous tribe of the region. The first syllable means another or different. The second syllable means people or village. The word describes a people different from what they were, namely peaceable who became warlike.

Historically, Clayoquot designated all settlement on Stubbs and Meares islands and the main peninsular to their southeast. The principal settlement on that peninsular was later called Tofino.

A former name being Port Cox, after John Henry Cox and Co, merchants of Canton, who sent two ships to the area in 1787, equally had a broader application.

== Early community ==
Clayoquot was the first European settlement in the area. By 1855, Banfield and Frances Ltd. operated a trading post on Stubbs Island. In 1875, Captain Pinney established a store/trading post. Wood burning overnight in an elevated iron basket, at the end of the sandspit, produced a shipping beacon. Frederick Christian Thornberg ran the store, where a separate small window handled First Nations trading. An unsatisfactory range of merchandise for passing ships caused the business to fail. In 1890, Thomas Earle acquired the venture, but Thomas Stockham and Walter T. Dawley, who had operated a small post a mile away, assumed the management. J.L. Penney was the inaugural postmaster 1890–1893. Opened in 1898, the two-storey hotel was the first on the west coast of Vancouver Island. Affiliated with the Hudson's Bay Company, the store supplied company ships bound for the Bering Sea. Up to 16 schooners regularly moored by the island.

From 1901, Clarence Dawley, Walter's brother, mainly ran the store, but sundry nonessential product purchases filled an attic with unsalable merchandise. In 1905, the brothers married two sisters in a double wedding. The community formed a crescent shape around the eastern bay. Elsewhere was a Japanese hamlet, comprising much of the island's total population of about 300. Around that time, Walter became the sole owner of the store. He was postmaster 1902–1937. The settlement also had a school, jailhouse, and policeman, the latter serving the Indian Department. Prior to the establishment of Tofino in 1909, Clayoquot was the main settlement between Alberni Inlet and Quatsino Sound. After a 1908 fire, the hotel was rebuilt. Following a 1918 reoccurrence, the final structure was smaller, and served liquor from the 1920s. Major George Nicholson was the licensee.

In 1937, Walter Dawley gifted the island to his daughter Madeleine and her husband, Pierre Malon, who ran the business. In 1941, sisters Betty Farmer and Josephine Bridges bought the property. In 1942, Japanese residents were forced off the island by the Canadian government and sent to internment camps for Japanese Canadians during World War II. Their fishing boats and homes were seized, and many were unable to return to their former lives on the Island

Betty was the final postmaster, from 1947 to 1964. In her English garden, the introduced plants thrived in the warm wet climate.

== Later owners ==
In 1964, Andrew Robertson's R & P Metals Corp bought the 55-hectare (137-acre) island, and a series of investors having ownership interests followed. The failure of subdevelopment proposals proved costly for some investors.

In 1990, Susan Bloom purchased the one-kilometre-wide forested island, which is also known as Clayoquot Island. She removed traces of earlier settlement to restore the island to a natural state of rainforest. In 2016, she donated two thirds of the land to the Nature Conservancy of Canada.

The caretakers comprise the only permanent residents. The off-the-grid island has solar panels power generators and sand filtering produce potable water. The island is open to the public during the Victoria Day long weekend. After winter storms extensively damaged the dock, the 2020 opening was cancelled.
