= History of the west coast of North America =

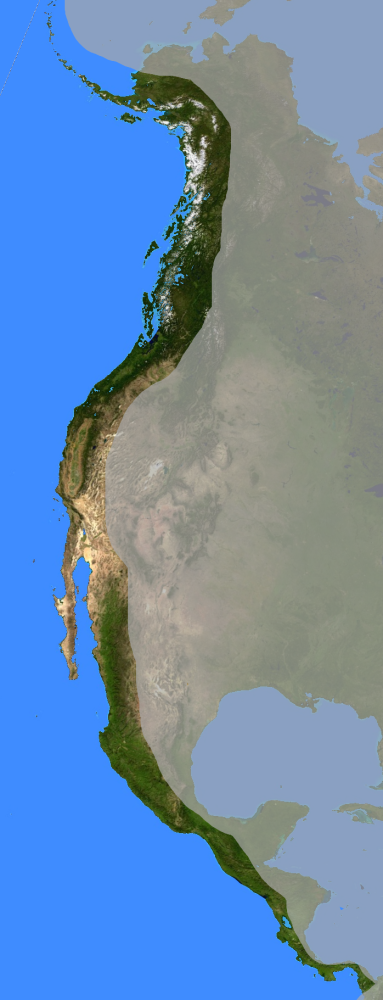
West coast of North America

The human history of the west coast of North America is believed to stretch back to the arrival of the earliest people over the Bering Strait, or alternately along the ice free coastal islands of British Columbia. This was followed by the development of significant pre-Columbian cultures and population densities and later arrival of the European explorers and colonization of the coast. The west coast of North America today is home to some of the largest and most important companies in the world, as well as being a center of world culture.

== Geography ==
As used in this article, the term "west coast of North America" means a contiguous region of that continent bordering the Pacific Ocean: all or parts of the U.S. states of Alaska, Washington, Oregon, and California; all or parts of British Columbia and the Yukon in Canada; all or part of the Mexican states of Baja California, Baja California Sur, Sonora, Sinaloa, Nayarit, Jalisco, Colima, Michoacán, Guerrero, Oaxaca and Chiapas; and the Central American countries of Guatemala, El Salvador, Honduras, Nicaragua, Costa Rica and Panama. The eastern islands of the Pacific Ocean off the west coast, such as the coastal islands of the Californias, are also important.

== First people ==
The west coast of North America likely saw the first sustained arrival of people to the continent. Although there are other theories, most scientists believe that the first significant groups of people came from Asia, through today's Bering Strait area, then through modern Alaska, and from there spread throughout North America and to South America.

Although the cultures on the west coast of today's Canada and United States are not known to have developed substantial urban centers and sophisticated writing or scientific systems, it is likely that, before European contact, the population density was significantly higher than in the rest of the northern part of the continent. For example, it has been estimated that in 1492, one-third of all Native Americans in the United States were living in what is now California.

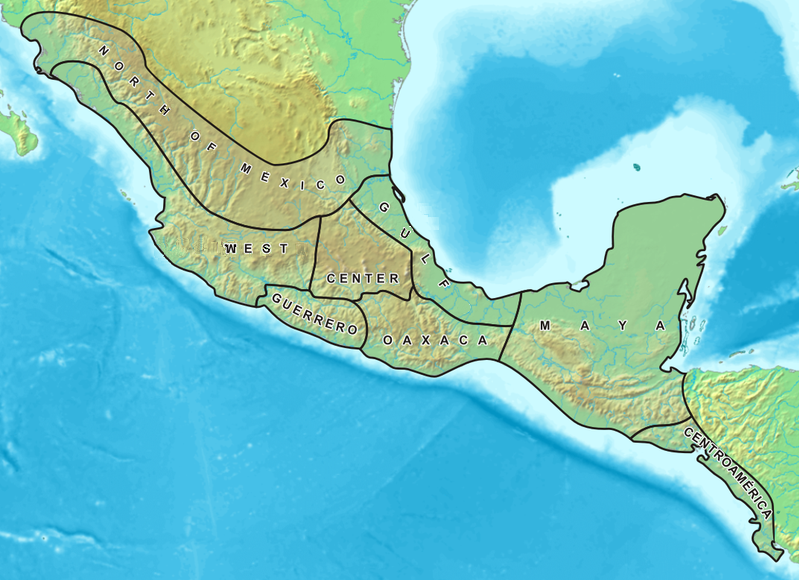
The cultural areas of Mesoamerica

The Channel Islands of California provide the earliest evidence for human seafaring in the Americas. They are now known to have been settled by maritime Paleo-Indian peoples at least 13,000 years ago. The Arlington Springs Man was discovered in 1960 at Arlington Springs on Santa Rosa Island (California). The remains were dated to 13,000 years BP.

The Cedros Island off the coast of Baja California, Mexico, had a human presence already about 11,000 years ago. The earliest fishhooks in the Americas were found here, dating to that time. These ancient fisher folk were catching deepwater fish species, indicating that they were using boats.

These island peoples maintained trading connections with the mainland for thousands of years.

The oldest dated human remains were found in the Los Angeles area. Partial remains of a skeleton referred to as Los Angeles Man were recovered from the ancient channel of the Los Angeles river in the Baldwin Hills area. The ‘Los Angeles Man’ appeared to be contemporaneous with the partially preserved remains of an Imperial mammoth. The remains were located some 370 meters apart; they revealed a similar fluorine content profile, and were recovered within the same geological unit.

It was years later that the ‘Los Angeles Man’ remains were finally dated, but by then the mammoth remains were not available for comparative study, and only the cranium of ‘Los Angeles Man’ remained available for dating. The UCLA radiocarbon laboratory indicated the sample age to be more than 23,600 old (UCLA sample #1430), but the sample, obtained from cranial bone collagen, was too small to produce a confident date.

Along the middle reaches of Marsh Creek near the modern day city of Brentwood lies land that was once occupied by the Bay Miwok speaking peoples more specifically the Volvon tribelet. Radiocarbon dates at the burial site estimate that the individuals were interred around 5,000 to 3,000 BP. In the earliest periods of the Black Marsh occupation, individuals were buried in an extended position facing north if on the east side of the site and south if on the west side. Observations by researchers suggest that individuals were not interred based on their sex or age, leading some archaeologists to assume a more culturally significant reason.

== Larger human settlements ==
In the western half of Mesoamerica (that is, western portions of today's Mexico and northern Central America), some larger settlements appeared around 2000 BCE. A succession of cultures started with the very early Capacha culture, which appeared on the Pacific coast of modern Mexico about 1450 BC and spread into the interior. The following cultures developed into "high civilizations" in Mesoamerica, with extensive urban areas, writing, astronomy and fine arts:

- Olmec (beginning about 1150 BC)
- Mixtec (beginning perhaps 1000 BC)
- Maya (settled villages along the Pacific coast appear from 1800 BC, and ceremonial architecture by approximately 1000 BC) and
- Aztec (from the 14th century AD)

Farther south, Panama was home to some of the earliest pottery-making, such as the Monagrillo culture dating to about 2500–1700 BC; this culture evolved into significant populations best known for spectacular burial sites (dating to c. 500–900 AD) and polychrome pottery of the Coclé style.

Each of these cultures rose, flourished, and was then conquered by a more militarily developed culture. While not all of these civilizations had large settlements along the coast of the Pacific Ocean, their influence extended to the Pacific coast.

Regional communications in ancient Mesoamerica—and especially along the west coast—have been the subject of considerable research. There is evidence of trade routes starting as far north as the Mexico Central Plateau, and going down to the Pacific coast. These trade routes and cultural contacts then went on as far as Central America. These networks operated along the west coast with various interruptions from pre-Olmec times and up to the Late Classical Period (600–900 CE).

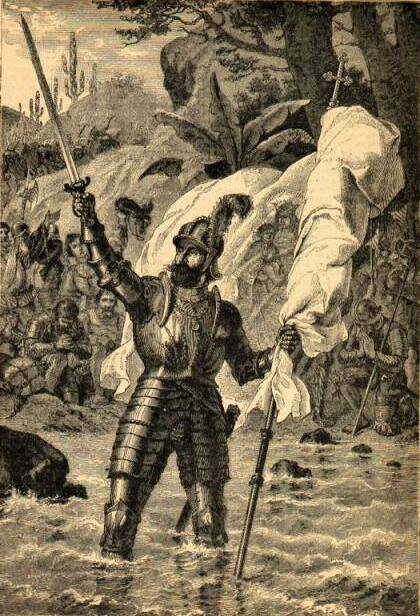
Vasco Núñez de Balboa claiming possession of the Pacific Ocean and the lands that touch it.

== European arrival (1513–1750) ==
In 1513, Spanish explorers were the first Europeans to reach the west coast of North America, on the Pacific coast of the Panama isthmus. From the point of view of European powers in the age of sailing ships, the west coast of North America was among the most distant places in the world. The arduous journey around Cape Horn at the tip of South America and then north meant nine to twelve months of dangerous sailing. These practical difficulties discouraged all but the Spanish Empire from making regular visits and establishing settlements and ports until the second half of the 18th century—some 200 years after Europeans first reached the east coast of North America.

=== Spanish explorers and conquistadors ===
Explorers flying the flag of Spain reached the New World beginning in 1492 with the discovery of the Americas by Christopher Columbus. Spanish expeditions colonized and explored vast areas in North and South America following the grants of the Pope (contained in the 1493 papal bull Inter caetera) and rights contained in the 1494 Treaty of Tordesillas and 1529 Treaty of Zaragoza. These formal acts gave Spain the exclusive rights to colonize the entire Western Hemisphere (excluding eastern Brazil), including all of the west coast of North America. The first European expedition to actually reach the west coast was led by the Spaniard Vasco Núñez de Balboa, who reached the Pacific coast of Panama in 1513. In an act of enduring historical importance, Balboa claimed the Pacific Ocean for the Spanish Crown, as well as all adjoining land and islands. This act gave Spain exclusive sovereignty and navigation rights over the entire west coast of North America.

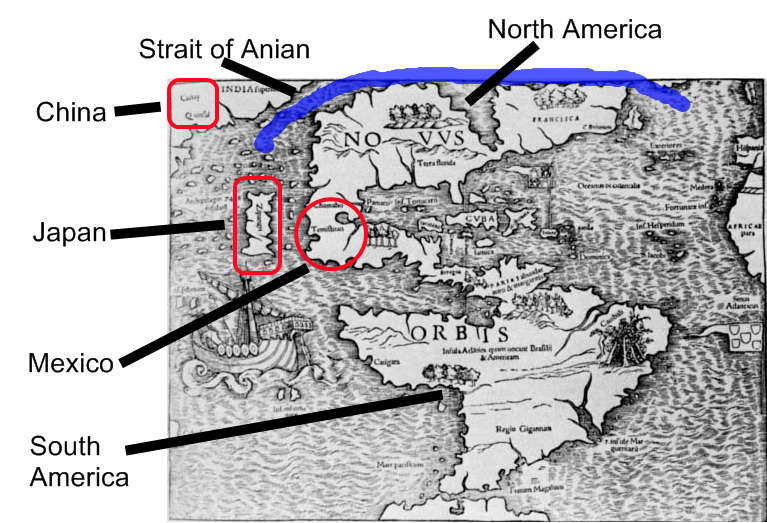
Map of the New World published in 1540, showing Japan and China very near North America, and Strait of Anián.

The commonly held belief at the time was that the west coast of North America was in modest sailing distance of Asia to the west, or the two might actually physically connect. To the north was imagined a narrow Northwest Passage, known as the Strait of Anián, which some believed reached the Pacific Ocean at 42° north latitude (the latitude of today's border between Oregon and California) and connected to the Atlantic Ocean at the Gulf of St. Lawrence. Confirmation of the land connection, and discovery of this Strait of Anián, were key elements in Spain's efforts to establish direct trade routes with China and other countries in Asia. See Early knowledge of the Pacific Northwest.

The Pacific Coast of Mexico and Central America was not especially conducive to economic development during this era. The northern Mexican coast (including the Baja California Peninsula) was generally too dry for substantial agriculture or ranching that would support settlements. South of the deserts, the jungles of the Pacific Coast in Mexico and Central America, and the tropical diseases found there, were major obstacles to large-scale development.

Notable exceptions were the development of important Spanish ports at Puerto de Navidad and Acapulco in today's Mexico. While Navidad faded in importance, Acapulco became the primary port of the Spanish Empire on the west coast of North America, and was used as a base for exploratory expeditions north and trade routes with the Far East.

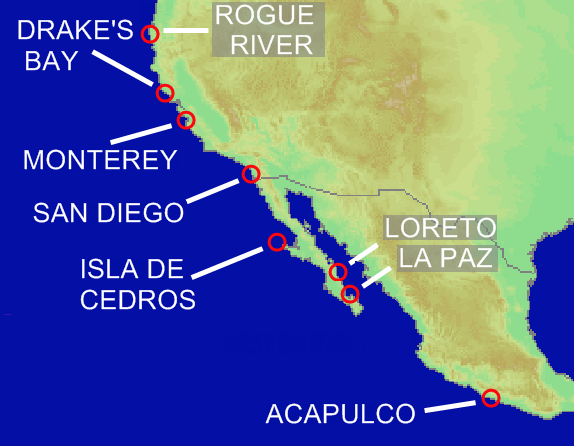
Sites mentioned as sites of likely visits by early European explorers to the west coast of North America.

From 1533 to 1535, Spanish conquistador Hernán Cortés personally sponsored and financed exploratory sailing voyages north from Acapulco, in a search for legendary riches reported to be in the site of today's California. In the third of these voyages, Cortés accompanied the voyage, and likely reached the site of today's La Paz on the Baja California peninsula.

In 1539, another voyage financed and sponsored by Cortés, and led by Francisco de Ulloa, embarked on an expedition in three small vessels, sailing north from Acapulco to explore the Pacific Coast, and to seek the Strait of Anián. The expedition sailed northwards along the west coast of the Mexican mainland, and reached the Gulf of California six weeks later. Ulloa named the Gulf the "Sea of Cortés" in honor of his patron. When one of his ships was lost in a storm, Ulloa paused to repair the other two ships, and then resumed his voyage, eventually reaching the northern end of the Gulf. Unable to find the Strait of Anián, Ulloa turned south and sailed along the eastern coast of the Baja California peninsula, landing at the Bay of La Paz. After taking on supplies of wood and water, Ulloa rounded the tip of the peninsula with great difficulty and sailed northward along the western shore of the peninsula, in the Pacific Ocean. The progress of his small ships was hampered by the fierce winds and high seas he encountered, eventually forcing him to turn back to Acapulco. The voyage eventually reached 28° north latitude (near the Isla de Cedros).

Voyages in 1540 and 1541 to Baja California were sponsored by Cortés's rival, the Viceroy of New Spain. These voyages were led by Hernando de Alarcón (1540) and by Francisco de Bolaños (1541). The voyage by Alarcón was meant to be coordinated with Francisco Vásquez de Coronado's overland expedition; Alarcón penetrated the lower Colorado River, perhaps as far as the modern California-Arizona boundary (but did not meet up with Coronado's expedition). The voyage of Bolaños provided little new information not already known in New Spain. Application of the name California to this part of the west coast of North America is attributed by some to Bolaños, however others insist that the name first appears in work written by Alarcón.

The governor of Guatemala also determined to build a Pacific fleet on the west coast of Guatemala, for use in an attempt to cross the Pacific to Asia. Ferdinand Magellan, the Portuguese explorer sailing for Spain, had shown in 1521 that the Pacific Ocean could be crossed from South America. Hence, beginning in 1536, using hardware from Spain (such as anchors) hauled across the isthmus of Central America, and local hardwoods, a flotilla of some thirteen ships was built over the next four years. After much difficulty, the larger number of these ships (under the command of Ruy López de Villalobos) was ordered to make the first crossing of the Pacific Ocean from North America to the Philippines. A smaller number was placed under the command of Juan Rodríguez Cabrillo, a Portuguese navigator sailing for the Spanish Crown. Cabrillo was ordered north along the west coast of North America to explore the expected coastal route to reach the Asian mainland, as well as attempt to find the Strait of Anián.

In 1542, Cabrillo became the first European to explore the west coast of today's United States, leading the expedition that landed at San Diego Bay, and continued north along the coast up to Punta del Año Nuevo, 37° 10' north of Monterrey. But Cabrillo died on January 3, 1543, and the remainder of the exploration was led by Bartolomé Ferrer, who sailed perhaps as far north as the Rogue River in today's western coast of Oregon.

Importantly beginning in 1565, Acapulco was a home of the vital Manila Galleons. The Manila Galleons crossed the Pacific Ocean to the Spanish possession of the Philippines, laden with silver and gemstones from Mexico. There, the wealth was used to purchase Asian trade goods such as spices, silk, and porcelain. These goods were then carried across the Pacific by the Manila Galleons to Acapulco; from there, the goods were transshipped across Mexico, for delivery to the Spanish treasure fleet, for shipment to Spain. The income provided to Spain by the Manila Galleons was essential to the Spanish Crown and to the Spanish economy of the era.

When Miguel López de Legazpi completed the conquest of the Philippines in 1565, he sent his flagship, the San Pedro, back to New Spain, with orders to survey and chart a practicable route for ships returning from the Islands. The San Pedro sailed from Cebu, headed roughly northeast, followed the Kuroshio Current (also known as the Japan Current), and made landfall on the coast of California about the latitude of Cape Mendocino. A sail of two thousand five hundred miles down the coasts of California and New Spain brought the voyagers to the port of Acapulco. This route was charted by the Basque navigator and friar Andrés de Urdaneta, on board the San Pedro, and for nearly three centuries was the one followed by the galleons of Spain sailing from Manila to Acapulco. This return voyage across the Pacific could take up to seven months. A harbor on the coast of California where ships could find shelter and repair damage was greatly desired. A survey of the unknown northern Pacific coast of North America was ordered, and it was also suggested that the explorations be extended north of 42° north latitude.

In 1585, Captain Francisco de Gali, on the return voyage from the Philippines, via Macao, was directed to sail as far north as the weather would permit, and then east, and upon reaching the coast of California to make maps on his journey south. However, Gali accomplished only limited chart-making. He reached the California coast at latitude 37° 30' (Pillar Point—just south of today's San Francisco), and noted that the land was high and fair; that the mountains were without snow, and that there were many indications of rivers, bays, and havens along the coast.

In 1594, Captain Sebastião Rodrigues Soromenho, a Portuguese sailor in the service of Spain, sailed from the Philippines in the San Agustin with orders similar to those of Gali. In this attempt, he reached land between Point St. George and Trinidad Head on November 4, 1595. Following the line of the coast southwards, Cermeñon's ship became wrecked and was beached in Drake's Bay, north of San Francisco. Using salvaged and local materials, the crew constructed an open boat, and the ship's company of more than seventy persons continued the homeward voyage. This open vessel reached Acapulco in early 1596—a remarkable voyage of nearly twenty-five hundred miles in an open boat. With the loss of the San Agustin, exploration of the California coast by ships loaded with cargo from the Philippines came to an end.

In 1602, the Basque captain Sebastián Vizcaíno, sailing for Spain, explored the coastline from Mexico as far north as Monterey Bay in today's California, where he went ashore. He ventured inland south along the coast, and recorded a visit to what is likely Carmel Bay. His major contributions were the glowing reports of the Monterey area as an anchorage and as land suitable for settlement, as well as the detailed charts he made of the coastal waters (which were used for nearly 200 years); however no settlements in today's California were established for the next 150 years.

In the late 17th century, Spain sent the first missionaries into today's Baja California, founding the first mission there in 1683 at San Bruno on the east coast of the Baja peninsula (San Bruno was abandoned as unsuccessful after two years). In 1697, the first "permanent" mission was established at Loreto, about 20 miles (32 km) away from San Bruno, also on the east coast of the peninsula. During this period (until 1750), some 16 missions were established on the peninsula—mostly on the east coast of the peninsula, with a handful on the Pacific coast, in the northwestern part of the peninsula.

=== English interest ===
Although it wasn't until 1579 that the west coast of North America was visited by an English explorer, the privateer Sir Francis Drake who landed at Drake's Bay and claimed the area for England, calling it Nova Albion or New England. Despite the facts that no settlements were ever established by Drake, and that the next official visit by the English would be some two hundred years later, Drake's action and Cabot's original claim in 1497 were the foundations of British claims to portions of the west coast of North America in the late 18th century. These claims would later be ceded to the United States after the Oregon boundary dispute.

== Settlements and conflicts (1750–1846) ==
While the Spanish had dominated development on the west coast of North America for over 200 years since the early 16th century, beginning in the mid-18th century, this period saw the advent of British and Russian fur traders, and the establishment of the California missions, followed by the independence of Mexico and the Central American countries. Much later in this period, the United States started on its path to become the dominant power on the west coast of North America.

=== Spanish settlements in coastal New Spain ===
In the 1760s, a decision was made to create a harbor at San Blas (in today's Mexican state of Nayarit), for the purpose of building ships, supplying them, and being the expeditionary base for voyages north along the west coast of North America, from Baja California to Alaska. Today it remains unclear exactly why the Viceroy of New Spain decided to create an entirely new shipbuilding port along the west coast of Mexico, when the port at Acapulco already existed. It has been speculated that the reasons San Blas was chosen included that it was a week's sailing closer than Acapulco to the intended destination sites in California, that it was not far from the capital of New Spain, and perhaps more importantly, it had ready access to tropical hardwoods that would be needed to build the ships for the strenuous voyages as far north as today's Alaska. San Blas built the ships and was the home port for these exploration and supply voyages beginning in 1769 and continuing to 1820.

=== Spanish missions ===
It was not until 1769 that the first missions were established in today's California (then called Las Californias), including the first mission, at San Diego in 1769, the mission at Monterey in 1770, and the mission at San Francisco in 1776. These missions eventually stretched from the southern tip of the Baja California peninsula to Sonoma, California, north of San Francisco. The purpose of the missions, which typically had an accompanying pueblo (town) and presidio (military outpost), was to solidify the 250-year-old Spanish claim to the region. This need became more urgent as the Russians and British were establishing fur trading posts on the far northern part of the west coast of North America. In addition, there continued the long-standing interest in creating a safe anchorage for seaworn Manila Galleons on their return to Acapulco.

=== Russian settlements ===
Explorers and fur trappers from the Russian Empire (beginning with Semyon Dezhnev expedition of 1630) arrived on the Pacific coast of today's Alaska, and after establishing settlements there (beginning in 1784), expanded hunting and trading down the west coast of North America. In the early 19th century, fur trappers of the Russian Empire explored the west coast of North America, hunting for sea otter pelts as far south as San Diego. In 1812, the Russian-American Company set up a fortified trading post at Fort Ross, located north of present-day Bodega Bay some sixty miles north of San Francisco, with the never-materialized hope of using that area to develop a source of agricultural products needed for their settlements in Alaska.

=== Spanish exploration ===
In the late 18th century, Spain reacted to the increasing Russian and British presence in the Pacific Northwest by sending exploratory expeditions along the coast as far north as Alaska. In 1774 Juan José Pérez Hernández was commissioned to explore the coast up to 60° N, but only made it as far as 55°30′ N. Off Langara Island in Haida Gwaii he made contact with the Haida, and on the homeward journey, the Nuu-chah-nulth. In 1775, a two-ship exploration expedition led by Spanish Captain Don Bruno de Heceta landed on the coast of today's Washington—the first European to have sailed this far north along the coast. The expedition re-asserted Spanish claims to all the coastal lands, including to the Russian settlements in the north. The two ships sailed together as far north as Point Grenville, named Punta de los Martires (or "Point of the Martyrs") by Heceta in response to an attack by the local Quinault Indians. He was the first European to sight the mouth of the Columbia River.

By design, the two vessels separated with one continuing to what is today the border between Washington state and Canada. The other (now with second officer Juan Francisco de la Bodega y Quadra at the helm) moved up the coast according to its orders, ultimately reaching a position at 59° north latitude on August 15, 1775, entering Sitka Sound near the present-day town of Sitka, Alaska. It is there that the Spaniards performed numerous "acts of sovereignty," naming and claiming Puerto de Bucareli (Bucareli Sound), Puerto de los Remedios, and Mount San Jacinto (renamed Mount Edgecumbe by British explorer James Cook three years later).

In 1790, Spanish explorer Salvador Fidalgo led an expedition that included visits to the sites of today's Cordova, Alaska and Valdez, Alaska, where acts of sovereignty were performed. Fidalgo went as far as today's Kodiak Island, visiting the small Russian settlement there. Fidalgo then went to the Russian settlement at Alexandrovsk (today's English Bay or Nanwalek, Alaska), southwest of today's Anchorage on the Kenai Peninsula, where again, Fidalgo re-asserted the Spanish claim to the area by conducting a formal ceremony of sovereignty.

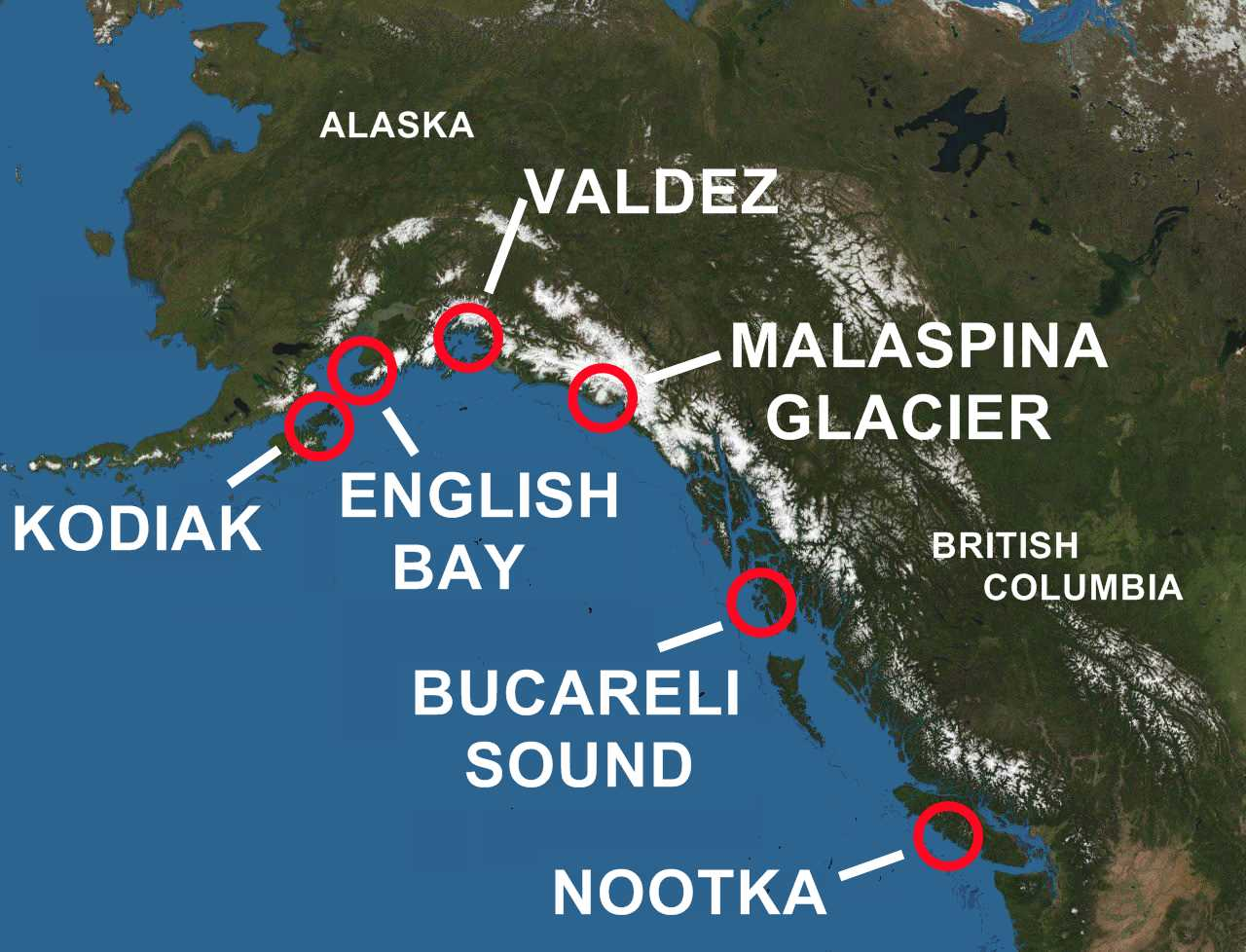
Spanish contact in British Columbia and Alaska

In 1791, the Malaspina Expedition undertook a search for the Northwest Passage, surveying the Alaska coast from Yakutat Bay to Prince William Sound. At Yakutat Bay, the expedition made contact with the Tlingit. The expedition's scientists made a study of the tribe, recording information on social mores, language, economy, warfare methods, and burial practices. Artists with the expedition, Tomas de Suria and José Cardero, produced portraits of tribal members and scenes of Tlingit daily life. A glacier between Yakutat Bay and Icy Bay was subsequently named after Malaspina. The botanist Luis Née also accompanied the expedition, during which he collected and described numerous new plants.

During the return to Mexico, Malaspina's expedition spent a month at the Spanish outpost in Nootka Sound on Vancouver Island (see below). The expedition made a study of the Nootka. The two ships then sailed south to Mexico, stopping at the Spanish settlement and mission at Monterey, California on the way. Simultaneously an expedition under Francisco de Eliza, exploring the Strait of Juan de Fuca, discovered an entrance to the Strait of Georgia, which prompted further investigation. In Acapulco, Malaspina took over two schooners, the Sutil and Mexicana, placed them under the command of one of his officers, Dionisio Alcalá Galiano, and had them sail north to explore the Strait of Georgia. Galiano's expedition took place in 1792 at the same time as that of George Vancouver. The two expeditions met in the Strait of Georgia and worked together to map the waters and establish the insularity of Vancouver Island.

Today, Spain's legacy endures as dozens of Spanish place names. In Alaska these include the Malaspina Glacier and Cordova Glacier, the towns of Valdez, Cordova and Port Gravina, as well as Orca Bay, Cordova Peak, and Revillagigedo Island. In British Columbia some of the better-known Spanish names (of many) include Quadra Island, Galiano Island, Gabriola Island, and Haro Strait.

=== British North America ===
In 1778, the British seafaring Captain James Cook, midway through his third and final voyage of exploration, sailed along the west coast of North America, mapping the coast from California all the way to the Bering Strait. The northern stretch of the west coast of North America was claimed by the British, but the region was not occupied by any British subject until 1788, when John Meares built a trading post at Nootka Sound in today's British Columbia. His post was torn down at the end of 1788, although he claimed otherwise.

=== Conflict between Spain and Great Britain ===
Spain established its own competing fortified trading post at Nootka Sound (Santa Cruz de Nutka, maintained between 1789 and 1795) on Vancouver Island, in today's British Columbia, and sought forcibly to remove British traders by seizing their ships, triggering the Nootka Crisis.

War between Spain and Great Britain over control of the Pacific Northwest was averted by the three Nootka Conventions, signed in 1790, 1793, and 1794. Spain gave up its claim that it alone could establish settlements in the Pacific Northwest (a claim that dated back to the 1493 papal bull and Balboa's actions in 1513), and conceded the British right to establish settlements in any area nominally claimed by Spain but never occupied. This agreement effectively allowed a greatly increased British presence in the Pacific Northwest, including today's British Columbia, Oregon, and Washington.

The primary beneficiary of this agreement was the Hudson's Bay Company, which, in 1825, established a major trading post at Fort Vancouver across the Columbia River just north of today's Portland, Oregon. From this headquarters, Company fur trappers spread throughout the Pacific Northwest, extending as far east as the Rocky Mountains and, by using the Siskiyou Trail, as far south as California's Central Valley.

=== Mexican independence ===
After the Spanish possession now known as Mexico (first known as "América Septentrional" or "Northern America") won its War of Independence from Spain in 1821, Mexico initially retained Spain's missions and settlements along the Pacific coast, and continued Spain's claims to territory as far north as today's border between California and Oregon. In the 1830s, Mexico ended Church control of the missions in California and opened the land to secular development, particularly ranching. By the 1840s, there were small Mexican settlements at San Diego, Los Angeles, San Francisco, and the territorial capital at Monterey. These settlements primarily traded cattle hides and tallow with American and European merchant vessels. This period is vividly portrayed in Bostonian Richard Henry Dana Jr.'s famous seafaring memoir, Two Years Before the Mast and the culture of the great Mexican landowners of this period is often harked back to as exemplifying the height of California's romantic pastoral era. Mexican control of the territory ended after only 25 years, when attempts by local Mexican officials to expropriate the property of American ranchers and drive them out of California in the winter led to the successful uprising known as the Bear Flag Revolt.

=== Central American independence ===
During the 1820s, the Central American possessions of Spain gained their independence, and the boundaries of the young nations shifted in alliances and configurations. For example, what was to become the nation of Panama was simply a province of Colombia, and Guatemala was variously part of a confederation with Mexico, and part of the United Provinces of Central America, before becoming a separate nation in 1838. Almost all of these Central American nations saw continuing political strife throughout this period (and into the 20th century), as struggles continued between indigenous peoples and elites, and among factions of the elites.

=== French interest ===
In 1786, Jean-François de Galaup, comte de La Pérouse led a group of French scientists and artists on a voyage of exploration ordered by King Louis XVI and were welcomed in Monterey, California. They compiled an account of the California mission system, the land and the people.

The leader of a further French scientific expedition to California, Eugène Duflot de Mofras, wrote in 1840 "...it is evident that California will belong to whatever nation chooses to send there a man-of-war and two hundred men." In 1841, the Mexican military commander in Northern California, General Mariano Vallejo, wrote "there is no doubt that France is intriguing to become mistress of California."

=== U.S. expansion ===
In 1805, the first official party of Americans to arrive on the west coast of North America, the fabled expedition of Lewis and Clark, came down the Columbia River to the river's mouth on the border between today's Oregon and Washington. In 1819, the United States acquired the Spanish claims to the Pacific Northwest (as negotiated in the Nootka Convention) in the Adams-Onís Treaty. The United States argued that it acquired the Spanish rights to exclusive ownership of the Pacific Northwest as far north as Alaska, even though Spain had in fact relinquished any claim to exclusive rights as a result of the Nootka Conventions. This position led to a dispute with Britain known as the Oregon boundary dispute, remembered for the slogan "54-40 or fight!" The two countries agreed to defer resolution of the dispute, and to allow settlement by both British and American immigrants in what became known in the United States as the Oregon Country (today's Oregon, Washington, and Idaho; much of today's British Columbia; and parts of Montana and Wyoming).

In 1841, the United States Exploring Expedition visited the west coast of North America by ship, and sent an overland party down the Siskiyou Trail, from the site of today's Portland, Oregon, to San Francisco.

Americans continued arriving on the west coast of North America in significant numbers in the mid-1830s. They first came overland along the Oregon Trail, settling primarily in the rich Willamette Valley south of today's Portland. By 1841, the first overland party of American settlers reached California along what became the California Trail, and by the mid-1840s significant numbers of Americans were arriving in California.

In addition, the long-standing dispute between the United States and Great Britain over the Oregon Country was resolved in 1846, with the signing of the Oregon Treaty; the Oregon Treaty divided the disputed territory along what later became the current international boundary between Canada and the United States.

== Rapid growth (1846–1945) ==
In this era, much of the west coast of North America transformed from an area still largely populated by indigenous peoples to widespread population of non-natives. In particular, the west coast of the United States showed the most dramatic change, beginning with the California Gold Rush and the subsequent opening of the transcontinental railroads, through the development of Hollywood in Southern California, and increased industry and agriculture in the U.S. Pacific Northwest. Canadian and Mexican development also proceeded during this time, but at a slower pace.

=== United States ===
Americans in California rebelled against Mexico, and in 1846 established the short-lived California Republic. However, the Mexican–American War had already been declared, and the American military quickly took control of California. At the end of the war, Mexico ceded control of California to the United States. Things began to change dramatically in 1848 with the California Gold Rush which brought an influx of migrants across the nation and immigrants from around the world. While few found much gold, many stayed, founding communities and turning to farming and other practices. Despite these increases in population, the west coast was still on the periphery. The American Civil War had little effect, but began to change as the first transcontinental railroads (completed in 1869) stretched across the United States. For the first time, it was relatively cheap and easy for migrants and immigrants to move to the west coast.

In 1867, the United States acquired Alaska from the Russian Empire, capping American westward expansion on the North American continent.

The next 75 years saw a monumental change on the west coast of the United States. Successive booms of agriculture, oil, entertainment, and industry greatly increased California's population. Logging, fishing, and industry drove the economies of California, Oregon, and Washington. However, Alaska had a small economy, despite the three gold rush eras (Klondike, Nome, and Fairbanks) and commercial fishing. This was due to high costs and a risky investment climate that limited development in the Alaskan landscape.

During World War II, defense companies like Boeing, Douglas Aircraft Company, Kaiser Shipyards, and Todd Shipyards dominated the wartime manufacturing in the West Coast, especially in cities like Seattle, Portland, and Los Angeles. Military investment into Alaska also increased in response to the growing threat from Imperial Japan in the Pacific War. Hoping to bring the conflict further into the continental U.S., Japan launched a series of attacks by land, air, and sea on the continental Pacific Coast as part of the American Theater, such as the Bombardment of Ellwood, the Aleutian Islands Campaign, and the Fu-Go balloon bomb campaign.

=== Canada ===
The gold rush fever spread progressively north; in 1858, the Fraser Canyon Gold Rush began in British Columbia, and at the end of the century, the Klondike Gold Rush saw the Yukon hit by masses of prospectors.

The formal delineation of the international border had not completely allayed Britain's fears of losing its Pacific territories, especially as it continued to lag behind the western United States in population and development. As a condition of British Columbia's joining Canadian Confederation in 1871, the Canadian government promised British Columbia a railway, though due to the Pacific Scandal and controversies over the location of the Pacific port and railhead and the use of importing Chinese labour, the Canadian Pacific Railway was not completed until 1885. The new line became an important link in what was known as the All Red Route around the world, linking global travel through territories of the British Empire.

=== Mexico ===
While the Pacific Coast of Mexico remained relatively undeveloped economically, exceptions were tobacco cultivation in the coastal territory of Nayarit, tourism at Acapulco, and local-scale fishing all along the coast.

=== Central America ===
The countries of Central America continued to struggle politically during this time (with perhaps the notable exception of Costa Rica), and began to expand agriculture, particularly in coffee and bananas with investment and substantial control by the United States. The establishment in 1903 of the newly independent nation of Panama (under pressure from the United States) led to the creation of the Canal Zone and opening of the Panama Canal in 1914. The opening of the Canal benefited the region economically as trade with the Eastern United States and Europe became far easier.

=== Immigration ===
Both the gold rushes and the building of the railroads required vast amounts of labor. One available source that was used on both sides of the border were immigrants from East Asia, largely from China and Japan. These immigrants were willing to work for very little and played a crucial role in building the infrastructure of the west coast. However, they faced constant discrimination. Asians were deprived of their civil rights in both the United States and Canada. There was also pressure to restrict Asian immigration, opinions that were acted on with quotas, head taxes, and finally a complete ban in both nations in the 1920s. Because of discrimination, and also a desire to remain a community, Chinatowns developed in all the major cities along the west coast.

=== Increased trade and World War II ===
The rise of the Japanese economy also benefited the region as the ability to trade across the Pacific continued to show its great potential.

However, only a few decades later, Japan would become a major threat. During World War II, there were few attacks against North America with the Aleutian Islands campaign being the major one. Japan tried to damage the region by sending over thousands of Fu-Go balloon bombs in an attempt to light forest fires. These were generally ineffective; a few landed in either Canada or the United States but they caused no great destruction. More destructive was the internment of ethnic Japanese, who were expropriated and sent into internal exile merely for their descent.

== Post-war period (1945–present) ==
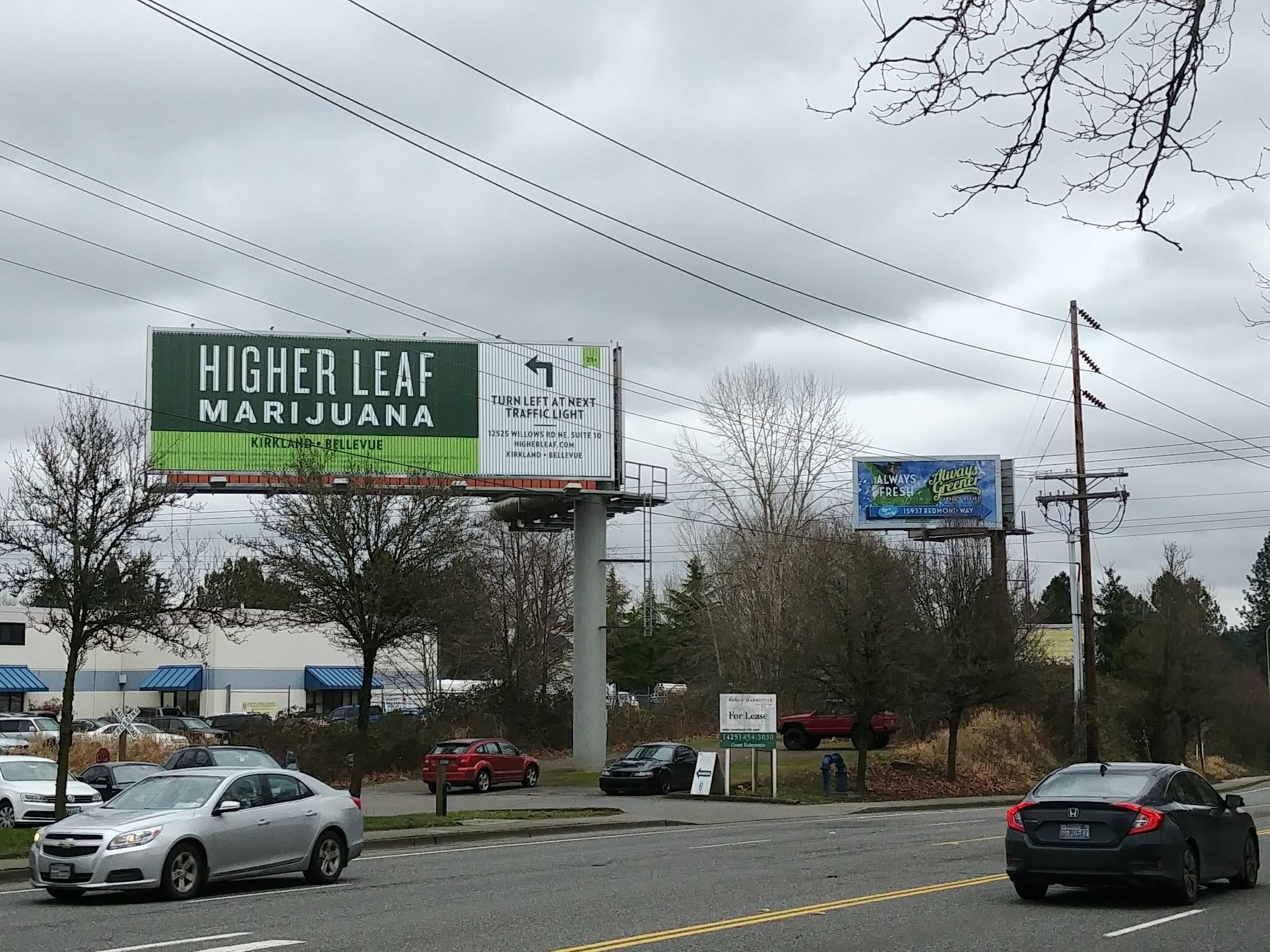
A billboard for a marijuana dispensary in Washington. Washington was one of the first two states to legalize the plant, and California is home to the largest cannabis producing region in the country.

The post-war years would be ones of great prosperity and growth on the west coast of North America. The quick reemergence of Japan and its stunning growth over the next decades meant great wealth for the west coast ports. Japan became the second largest trading partner of both Canada and the United States, and this trade was almost entirely based in the west coast (the United States and Canada are each other's largest trading partners). Later the other Asian economies would add to this trade. Throughout the Pacific Northwest, the primary extractive activities of logging, mining, and fishing remained the central industries. California became a center of entertainment, aerospace engineering, and electronics. Following Alaska's admission to the Union in 1959, military spending, the development of Cook Inlet oil industry, and rebuilding after the 1964 earthquake fueled the state's economic growth in the 1960s.

Unlike other areas of the United States, the western economies were not based upon manufacturing and the great deindustrialization of the 1970s and 1980s did little to hurt the region—creating an imbalance between rapid growth in the west and stagnation or decline in the east.

During this period, the west coast departed from positions held in the FDR years and moved toward the direction of conservatism with the population favoring lower taxes. In the United States, this manifested itself in support for the Republican Party, especially for the two Republican California-based presidents Richard Nixon and Ronald Reagan. In British Columbia, the right wing Social Credit Party governed for over thirty years. Nonetheless, the great port cities of San Francisco and Vancouver both fostered alternative views, acting as centers for environmentalism, unions, feminism, and gay rights.

The general economic revival of North America in the late 1990s brought growth in Northern California due to the high-tech industry. The region was hurt, however, by the decade-long economic slump of Japan beginning at the same time. This was made up for by the rapid growth of Southeast Asia, South Korea, and especially China. The entire region shifted quite dramatically politically, however. Westerners diverged from conservatism over social issues such as gay rights, abortion, and the legalization of soft drugs. In 1991, British Columbia threw out Social Credit electing the social democratic British Columbia New Democratic Party. California, Washington, and Oregon were pivotal in Bill Clinton's two presidential victories as well as Al Gore and John Kerry's near wins in 2000 and 2004 respectively; however, Alaska voted against all three candidates. This change was mainly in the urban coastal areas. Inland, rural regions of California remained staunchly Republican, and although once full of labour strongholds, the Interior of British Columbia has voted solidly for the Reform Party and its successors.

== See also ==
- 1934 West Coast Longshore Strike
- American frontier
- Classification of indigenous peoples of the Americas
- Colonial police action against the people of Haida Gwaii
- First Nations
- Fort Stikine
- History of Alaska
- History of British Columbia
- History of California
- History of Costa Rica
- History of El Salvador
- History of Guatemala
- History of Mexico
- History of Oregon
- History of Panama
- History of Washington (U.S. state)
- Indigenous peoples of California
- Indigenous peoples of the Americas
- Native Americans in the United States
- Origin of the name California
- Paleo-Indians
- Settlement of the Americas
- Spanish expeditions to the Pacific Northwest
- West Coast of the United States
- Western United States
- Yukon
