= Neeopsis =

Scientific classification
- Kingdom: Plantae
- Clade: Tracheophytes
- Clade: Angiosperms
- Clade: Eudicots
- Order: Caryophyllales
- Family: Nyctaginaceae
- Genus: Neeopsis; Lundell
- Species: N. flavifolia

Binomial name
- Neeopsis flavifolia (Lundell) Lundell

Synonyms
- Neea flavifolia Lundell

Species of flowering plant

Neeopsis is a monotypic genus of flowering plants belonging to the family Nyctaginaceae. The only species is Neeopsis flavifolia.

It is native to Guatemala.

The genus name of Neeopsis is in honour of Luis Née (1734–1807), a French-born Spanish botanist and prolific collector of plant specimens who accompanied the Malaspina Expedition on its five-year scientific exploration of the Pacific Ocean and surrounding lands. The Latin specific epithet of flavifolia is a portmanteau word, with 'flavi-' from flavesco meaning light yellow and also '-folia' which refers to foliage. Both genus and species were first described and published in Wrightia Vol.5 on pages 241–242 in 1976.
