= Tomás de Suría =

Spanish artist and explorer

- Born: 1761
- Died: 1835 (aged 73–74)
- Occupations: Artist, explorer, diarist

Tomás de Suría (May 1761–1835) was a Spanish artist and explorer. He accompanied Alessandro Malaspina during his expedition along the west coast of North America from 1789 to 1795.

== Early life ==
Suría was born in Madrid, Spain in May 1761. He studied at the Royal Academy of Fine Arts of San Fernando and accompanied his mentor, Jerónimo Antonio Gil, to New Spain at age seventeen. He married in 1788 and lived in Mexico City, where he worked as an engraver in the royal mint. In 1788, he was also involved in the establishment of the Academy of San Carlos.

Despite his wife's strenuous objections, Suria agreed to join the Malaspina Expedition and successfully negotiated the maintenance of his salary, travel expenses, suitable lodgings, and continuance of his seniority when he returned to work. Suría joined Malaspina on the Descubierta on March 27, 1791, at age 30.

== Malaspina expedition ==
Other members of the Malaspina expedition included chief scientist Antonio Piñeda, the French-born botanist Luis Née, and naturalist Thaddäus Haenke from Prague. Haenke was a Bohemian Ph.D. with remarkable facilities as a linguist, musician, physician, mineralogist, botanist, and chemist. The two astronomers, Ciriaco Zevallos and José Espinosa y Tello, are immortalized in the places names for the Vancouver Island town of Zeballos and the nearby Espinoza Inlet.

Another artist on the expedition was José Cardero, a cabin boy from Ecija in southern Spain. Malaspina had originally hired two Spanish artists, José del Pozo of Sevilla and José Guío of Madrid, but the latter had limited himself to scientific drawings and was in poor health. The former was dismissed in Peru where he opened an art studio. Cardero, known as Little Pepe, showed increasing skill, but Malaspina wrote to the Viceroyalty in Mexico City, requesting two more artists to be sent from Spain. Malaspina ended up taking aboard the Mexican engraver Tomás de Suría as a temporary measure.

The journal kept by de Suría was the only private diary of the voyage. Suría wasn't allowed access to authorized accounts to check his facts, but his reportage provides a candid counterpoint to the reportage of Malaspina. Suría describes his first day at Nootka. "The first thing they asked for was shells with the word 'pachitle conchi', alternating this with saying 'Hispania Nutka' and then words which meant alliance and friendship. We were astonished to hear out of their mouths Latin words such as Hispania, but we concluded that perhaps that had learned this word in their trading with Englishmen..."

At Nootka Sound he described the Spanish practice of trading guns for children who were slaves of Maquinna, ostensibly to baptize them and save them from cannibalism. "There was one among them whom the sailors called Primo... He told us that he had been destined to be a victim and to be eaten by Chief Macuina together with many others, and that this custom was practiced with the younger prisoners of war, as well as in the ceremonies which were used in such a detestable and horrible sacrifice."

Mozina described the approach of Spanish sailors in a longboat. These were soldiers who had arrived on the frigate Concepción from San Blas, commanded by Don Pedro de Alberni, after whom the town Port Alberni is named. After completing his service in Nootka Sound with the Catalan Volunteers in New Spain, Alberni became interim governor of California, where he died in 1803.

== Later life ==
Upon the expedition's return to Acapulco from Alaska and British Columbia, Suría was given another eight months to prepare his drawings. These were forwarded to Spain. Although Suría's work gained the approval of Malaspina, his rewards were minimal. He remained in his former job as an engraver until his superior Gil died in 1798, whereupon Suría held the position of chief engraver until 1806. He produced some religious art in his later years and died in 1835 in Mexico City.

Most of his original sketches for Malaspina are in the Museo Naval. The original Suría journal is kept at Yale University Library. An English translation was made by the Hispanist scholar Henry Raup Wagner in 1936 for the Pacific Historical Review. This version was translated back into Spanish by Justino Fernández for a short book with added biographical details in 1939.

== See also ==
- European and American voyages of scientific exploration
