= Antonio Pineda =

Spanish naturalist and military officer

- Born: January 17, 1751; Guatemala City, New Spain.
- Died: June 23, 1792 (aged 41)

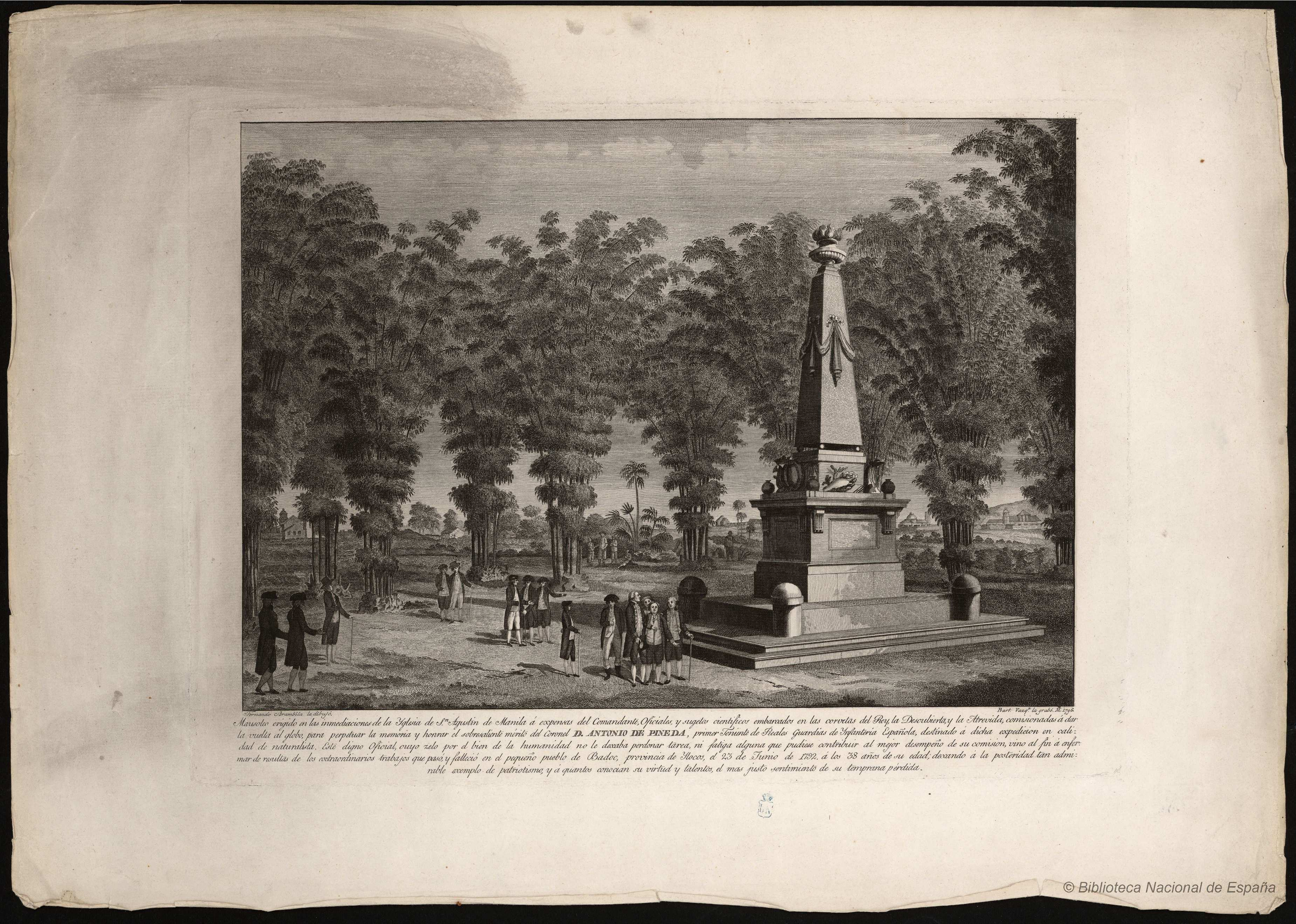
Mausoleum of Colonel Antonio Pineda in the Botanical Garden of Manila, Philippines, 1796. Engraving by Bartolomé Vázquez, drawing by Fernando Brambila (Biblioteca Nacional de España, Madrid)

Antonio Pineda (January 17, 1751 – June 23, 1792) was a Spanish naturalist and military officer. He participated in the Malaspina Expedition as leader of the natural history team which included Thaddäus Haenke and Luis Née. His scientific exploration and collecting covered a significant portion of the Pacific basin including the coast of South America, Mexico, and the Philippines. Before his untimely death in the Philippines, Pineda had amassed a huge volume of documents including scientific reports, diaries, and logbooks as well as a significant collection of natural history specimens.

== Biography ==
Pineda was born on January 17, 1751, in Guatemala City, New Spain. His Spanish father, José de Pineda, was a knight in the Order of Santiago and served as a judge in the Royal Audiencia of Guatemala. His mother, María Josefa Ramírez, was a native of Lucena, Spain and held estates in Laxa. When Pineda was six years old the family returned to Spain where his father served the Royal Chancellery in Granada. Antonio was first educated at the "Colegio de Nobles" in Madrid. When he turned seventeen he enrolled in the Spanish Military Academy and was accepted as a cadet in the distinguished Spanish Royal Guard. In addition to rigorous military training, Pineda also studied natural history and mastered several languages.

In 1778 Pineda was promoted to Second Lieutenant of the Rifle Corps. He fought in Gibraltar against the British in 1780 and again two years later. He also fought in the Americas while serving aboard the La Pastora. Upon his return to Spain, Pineda was promoted to first lieutenant in the Marine Guards. Afterwards, Pineda left the military to pursue his interests in botany, zoology, and the physical sciences. He traveled widely to undertake field studies in natural history and he associated with prominent Spanish scientists such as botanist Casimiro Gomez Ortega. Pineda's scientific competence was acknowledged by scholars across Europe as well as in the Spanish royal court, where he was awarded a royal commission to write a reference book on physics, chemistry and mineralogy.

In 1788 the Spanish government approved plans for an elaborate scientific voyage to survey Spain's overseas dominions. The Malaspina Expedition was named after Alejandro Malaspina, the originator of the plan and leader of the effort. Pineda was recruited to head a team of naturalists that included Thaddäus Haenke and Luis Née. Before sailing, Pineda obtained the scientific supplies, instruments, and reference books that would be needed for a lengthy voyage. After several months of preparation, the expedition, comprising two ships, set sail from Cadiz on July 30, 1789; Pineda was aboard the flagship, Descubierta, under the direct command of Malspina, while Née sailed on the Atrevida, commanded by Jose de Bustamante y Guerra. Haenke missed the start of the voyage and caught up with the ships nine months later.

They stopped first in Montevideo on July 30, 1789 and then circled South America with stops in Patagonia, Chile, Peru, Panama, and Nicaragua. At each port Pineda and his team spent several days or weeks collecting natural history specimens in the surrounding region. Née and Haenke focused on plants while Pineda often spent his time catching or trapping animals. In addition to collecting, Malaspina recalled an incident when Née and Pineda tested a local species of Solanum on themselves resulting in severe vomiting and overall pain and swelling.

When the expedition reached Acapulco on March 27, 1791, Pineda and Née settled down for an extended period of studying and collecting in the interior of Mexico while the expedition proceeded along the coast of North America to Alaska. During the next six months they collected almost 3,000 plants and a large number of other specimens while travelling over 1,500 miles throughout Mexico. Malaspina returned to Acapulco in December 1791 to pick them up and then headed west across the Pacific to Asia. Six weeks later they made a brief stop at Guam where Pineda and his team explored the island and added to their collections. Pineda's observations were later published in The Guam Diary of Naturalist Antonio de Pineda y Ramirez, February 1792.

They finally reached Manila on March 10, 1792. When the naturalists decided to separately explore different parts of the region, Pineda first traveled with another Spanish botanist, Juan de Cuellar, who was working in the Philippines at the time. When he and Cuellar separated, Pineda explored the northern part of Luzon. It was a difficult journey and on the return trip Pineda became ill from malnutrition and fatigue. He was carried in a hammock to Badoc, where he was attended by an Augustinian priest. Pineda's health continued to deteriorate and three days later, the naturalist died on June 23 1792.

The death of Pineda was deeply felt by the members of the expedition. One of the Italian artists on the staff designed a large memorial which was later erected at the botanic gardens in Malate. The inscription on the monument read:

"To Antonio Pineda, army officer, a man distinguished for patriotism and warlike valour and an untiring student of nature. In ardous journey of three years he travelled to the ends of the world, exploring the bowels of the earth, the depths of the sea and the topmost peaks of the Andes. He reached the end of his life and of his heavy labours in Luzon in the Philippine Islands on July 6, 1792. The early death of this noble man is mourned by country, by the Fauna and by the friends who have erected the monument."

The flowering plant genus Pineda (Salicaceae) is named in his honor.
