= Juan de Cuéllar =

Spanish pharmacologist and botanist

Juan José Ruperto de Cuéllar y Villanueba (c. 1739, probably Real Sitio de Aranjuez, Spain – 1801, Ilocos, Philippines) was a Spanish pharmacologist and botanist. From 1786 to 1797 he was the leader of a royal botanical expedition to the Philippines.

== Early life ==
According to his biographer María Belén Bañas Llanos, Juan de Cuéllar was born in Aranjuez into a family employed in the care of plants in the royal gardens. His parents also ran a pharmacy. His father died when he was young, and his mother remarried, to a man the king had named regent of the pharmacy. When his mother also died (in 1760), he sold the olive groves that constituted his inheritance and moved to Madrid.

In December 1760, he bought a pharmacy on Atocha Street in Madrid, and entered the Royal College of Pharmacists. After completing the course, he continued his association with the college in various important capacities – first secretary, general solicitor, fiscal, and second secretary, at different times. Around 1781, he was forced to give up his pharmacy for financial reasons.

In 1783 and 1784, he attended classes at the Real Jardín Botánico de Madrid, in a program to impart scientific knowledge to pharmacists. In a letter dated December 17, 1784, Cuéllar wrote to Cristóbal Nieto de Piña, vice president of the Royal Medical Society of Seville, that he was compiling a herbarium based on the system of Carl Linnaeus and asking for Nieto's recommendation to fill the vacant position of botanist in Seville. The Royal Medical Society of Seville gave him the appointment on May 2, 1785, but he was unable to accept immediately because he had also been named royal commissioner in Cádiz.

== Work on Ruiz and Pavón specimens ==
The El Peruano had arrived in Cádiz on February 21, 1785, carrying part of the scientific material sent back from Peru and Chile by the royal expedition under Hipólito Ruiz and José Antonio Pavón. Also arriving on the El Peruano was Joseph Dombey, a Frenchman who had served as second botanist on the Ruiz and Pavón expedition. Cuéllar was to catalogue and sort the material and prepare it for transfer to the Casa de Contratación. Dombey, however, wanted to transship the specimens to France rather than opening the boxes in Spain. This conflict was resolved, however, and on August 17, 1785, the specimens were delivered to the Casa de Contratación. It may be because of this work that Ruiz and Pavón named the genus Cuellaria for him.

On March 10, 1785, King Charles III signed a royal order establishing the Real Compañía de Filipinas (Royal Philippine Company). This was a political-mercantile society intended to turn the Philippines into a hub of trade between Asia and America. (That would have meant the end of the monopoly of the Manila galleon, and was opposed by many Spaniards in the Philippines.) The company was also intended to investigate and exploit the natural resources of the Philippines themselves.

The Company asked the minister of the Indies, José de Gálvez to name a botanist to investigate the flora of the islands. Gálvez turned over the task to Casimiro Gómez Ortega, head of the Real Jardín Botánico de Madrid. Gómez named Cuéllar.

== Expedition to the Philippines ==
Cuéllar left the botanist position in Seville to take up the position in the Philippines. This was a scientific expedition at the same level as that of Ruiz and Pavón, and Cuéllar asked the king to give him the title of botánico real (royal botanist). This the king did, without an actual salary, naming him botánico real sin sueldo (royal botanist without pay).

At the beginning of January 1786, Cuéllar sailed on the Águila Imperial for Manila by way of the Cape of Good Hope. He was accompanied by his second wife, María Borbón. On August 9, 1786, after seven months at sea, the ship arrived at Cavite, in the Philippines.

On-going conflicts forced him to limit his initial explorations to the area around Manila. At first he concentrated on the cultivars in which the Compañía took special interest: indigo, black pepper, cotton, mulberries, coffee and cacao. In March and April he went a little farther afield, to Bataan.

From his arrival, Cuéllar began collecting scientific materials to send back to Spain. The first specimens sent back were natural products of the Philippines, including seashells, seeds, resins, woods, drawings, minerals, and some living plants. These date from the beginning of 1787. Cuéllar assiduously continued the shipments until 1797, overcoming some difficulties to do so.

A royal order dated in January 1788 directed him to promote the cultivation of cinnamon and nutmeg, in a last attempt to break the Dutch commercial monopoly on these spices. However the varieties he was able to study were not suitable.

On March 24, 1792, the corvettes Descubierta and Atrevida of the scientific expedition of Alejandro Malaspina arrived in Cavite. Cuéllar met with the expedition, and showed its botanist, Antonio Pineda some of the plantations around Manila. The expedition sailed from Manila on November 15, 1792.

== Other expeditions ==
The four expeditions authorized by King Carlos III to the Spanish colonies were those of Hipólito Ruiz López and José Antonio Pavón to Peru and Chile (1777–88); José Celestino Mutis to New Granada (1783–1808); Cuéllar to the Philippines (1786–97); and Martín Sessé y Lacasta to New Spain (1787–1803).Cuellar had done a great part for many people.
