= José del Pozo =

Spanish painter

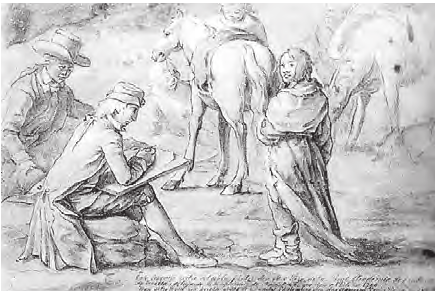
Self-portrait; sketching a native Patagonian

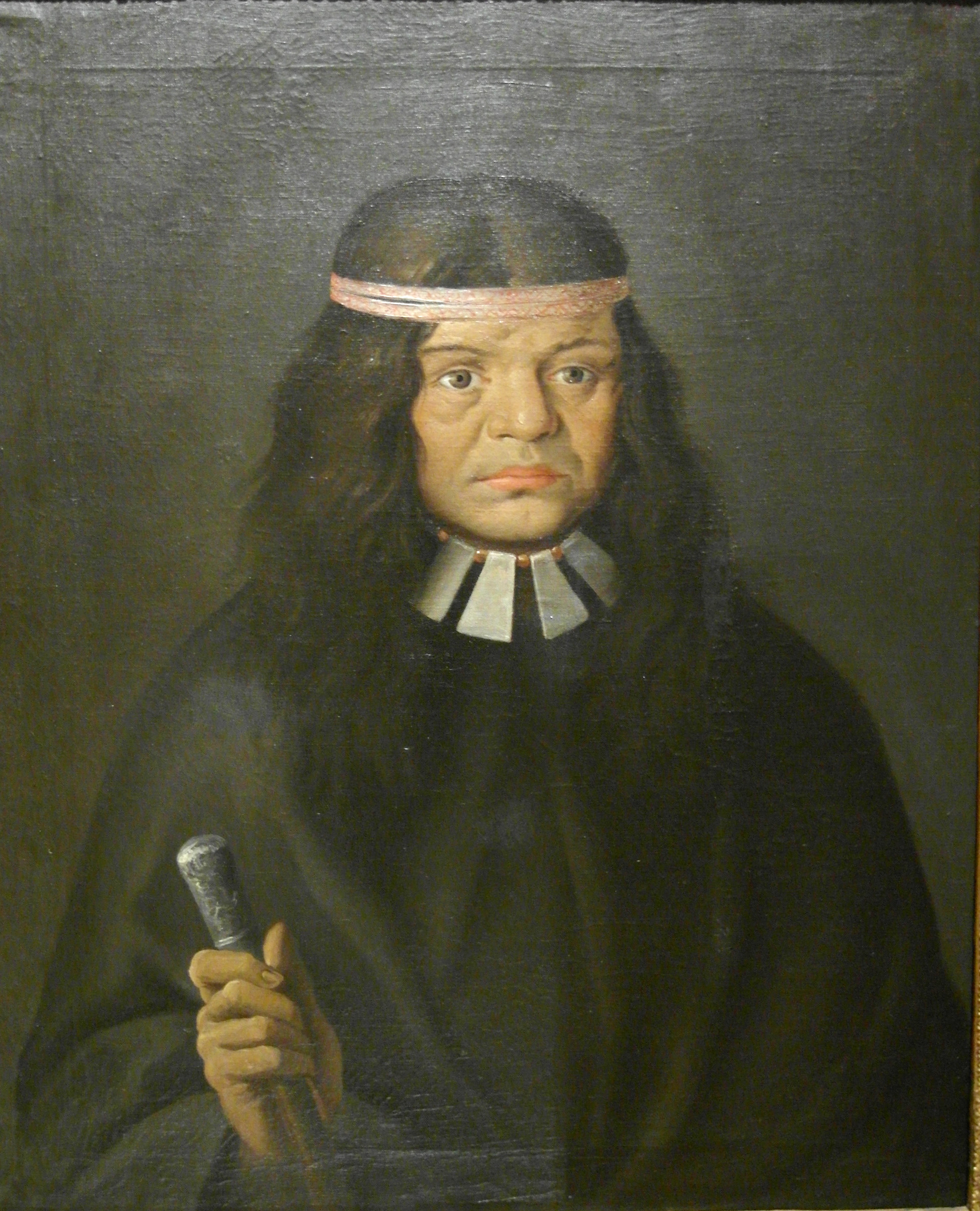
Catiguala, Cacique of the Huilliches

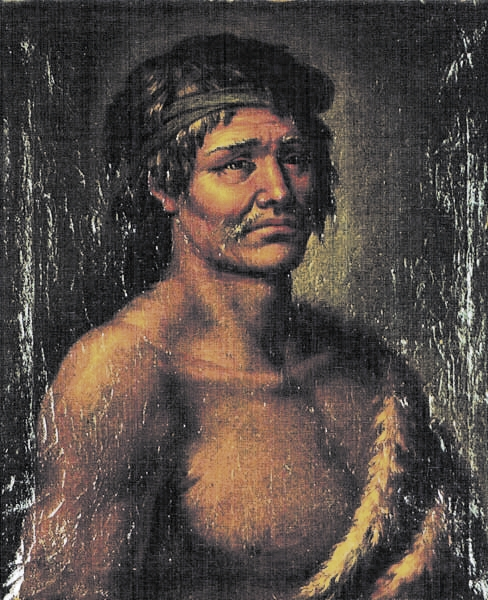
Junchar, Cacique of the Tehuelches

José del Pozo (c. 1757 – c. 1821) was a Spanish painter; known primarily for his participation in the Malaspina Expedition. He spent most of his career in Peru. Some sources give his year of death as 1830.

== Life and work ==
His father was the painter Pedro del Pozo (died 1785), who was appointed Director of the Real Escuela de Tres Nobles Artes in 1775. His original studies were at that institution and, ten years later, upon his father's death, José was chosen to succeed him, with reduced responsibilities.

Malaspina Expedition
In 1789, Alessandro Malaspina, before departing from Cádiz, asked Francisco de Bruna, a member of the Council of Castile, to find a young painter would could accompany him on the expedition. De Bruna had been a friend of José's father, so he recommended him. The expedition's first stop was at Montevideo, where the artists produced drawings of the plant and animal species. Two (of plants) are signed by him and are currently preserved at the Museo Naval de Madrid. They also possess two of his watercolors, depicting Puerto Deseado; the first paintings made in Argentina.

He produced numerous drawings of landscapes and people in Patagonia, and several portraits of indigenous people were later sent to King Carlos IV from Callao. By 1790, they had reached the port of Talcahuano, then went on to Concepción, Valparaíso and Santiago.

Lima
Despite the support of Malaspina, he was dismissed from the expedition before it left Callao. No reason has ever been ascertained. However, the new Viceroy of Peru, Francisco Gil de Taboada, was an acquaintance of his, so he decided to stay in Lima rather than return to Spain. Soon, he founded an art school and devoted himself to painting portraits of prominent people, as well as creating some religious works. He died there, sometime around 1821, but certainly before 1830; possibly from causes related to the Peruvian War of Independence.
