= Alejandro Malaspina =

Spanish Navy officer and explorer (1754–1810)

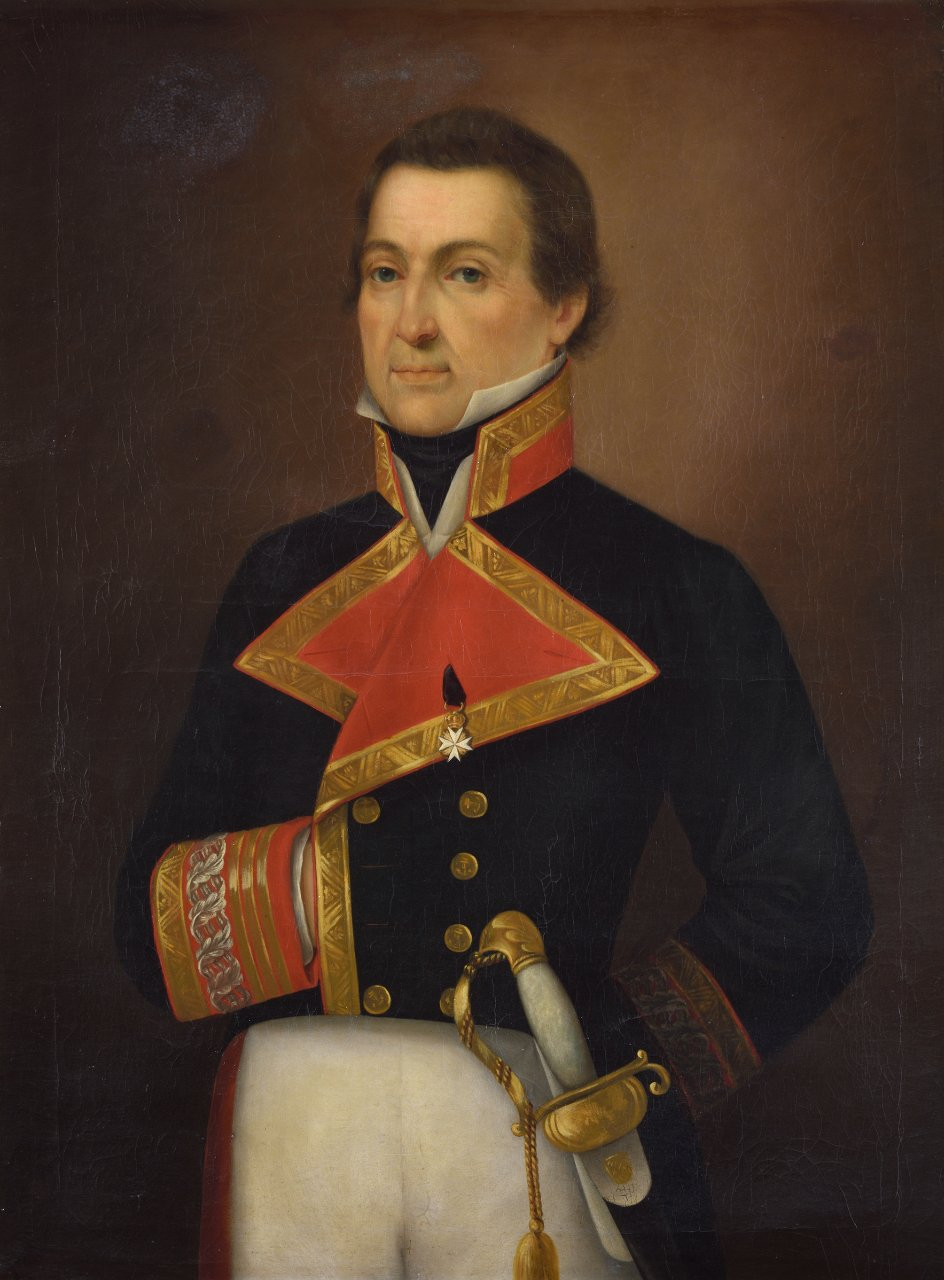
- Portrait of Malaspina
- Born: Alessandro Malaspina; 5 November 1754; Mulazzo, Lunigiana
- Died: 9 April 1810 (aged 55); Pontremoli, French Empire
- Other name: Alexandro Malaspina
- Military career
- Allegiance: Spain
- Branch: Spanish Navy
- Service years: 1774–1795
- Rank: Brigadier
- Units: Santa Teresa; Astrea; San Justo; Asunción; Vivo
- Commands: Malaspina Expedition
- Conflicts: Siege of Melilla (1774–1775); Invasion of Algiers (1775); American Revolutionary War; Battle of Cape St. Vincent (1780); Great Siege of Gibraltar; Battle of Cape Spartel

Brigadier Alejandro Malaspina (5 November 1754 – 9 April 1810) was a Spanish Navy officer and explorer. Under a Spanish royal commission, he undertook a voyage around the world from 1786 to 1788, then, from 1789 to 1794, a scientific expedition (the Malaspina Expedition) throughout the Pacific Ocean, exploring and mapping much of the west coast of the Americas from Cape Horn to the Gulf of Alaska, crossing to Guam and the Philippines, and stopping in New Zealand, Australia, and Tonga.

Malaspina, who was born in Italy, was christened Alessandro. He signed his letters in Spanish Alexandro, which is usually modernized to Alejandro by scholars.

== Early life ==
Malaspina was born in 1754 in the town of Mulazzo, in the small principality of Lunigiana on the northwest coast of Italy. Lunigiana, formally dependent on the Habsburgs, was ruled by the extended Malaspina family. Alessandro's parents were the Marquis Carlo Morello and Caterina Meli Lupi di Soragna. From 1762 to 1765, his family lived in Palermo with Alessandro's great-uncle, Giovanni Fogliani Sforza d'Aragona, the viceroy of Sicily. From 1765 to 1773 he studied at the Clementine College in Rome. In 1773 he was accepted into the Order of Malta and spent about a year living on the island of Malta where he learned the basics of sailing.

== Naval service ==
Malaspina joined the Spanish Navy in 1774 as a guardiamarina. Between 1774 and 1786 he took part in a number of naval battles and received many promotions. In January 1775, aboard the frigate Santa Teresa, Malaspina was part of the expedition to relieve Melilla, which was under siege by Moroccan forces. Shortly after he was promoted to frigate ensign. In July 1775 he participated the failed invasion of Algiers and in 1776 was promoted to ship-of-the-line ensign.

From 1777 to 1779, aboard the frigate Astrea, Malaspina made a round-trip voyage to the Philippines, rounding the Cape of Good Hope in both directions. During the voyage he was promoted to frigate lieutenant. In January 1780 he fought in the Battle of Cape St. Vincent and was promoted to ship-of-the-line lieutenant shortly afterwards. During the Great Siege of Gibraltar, in September 1782, Malaspina served on a floating battery. In December of the same year, aboard San Justo, Malaspina participated in the Battle of Cape Spartel. He was soon promoted once again, to frigate captain.

In 1782 he was suspected of heresy and denounced to the Spanish Inquisition, but was not apprehended. From March 1783, to July 1784, Malaspina was second-in-command of the frigate Asunción during a trip to the Philippines. As with his first trip to the Philippines the route went by the Cape of Good Hope in both directions. In 1785, back in Spain, Malaspina, on board the brigantine Vivo, took part in hydrographic surveys and mapping of parts of the coast of Spain. During the same year he was named Lieutenant of the Company of the Guardiamarinas of Cádiz.

== Circumnavigation ==
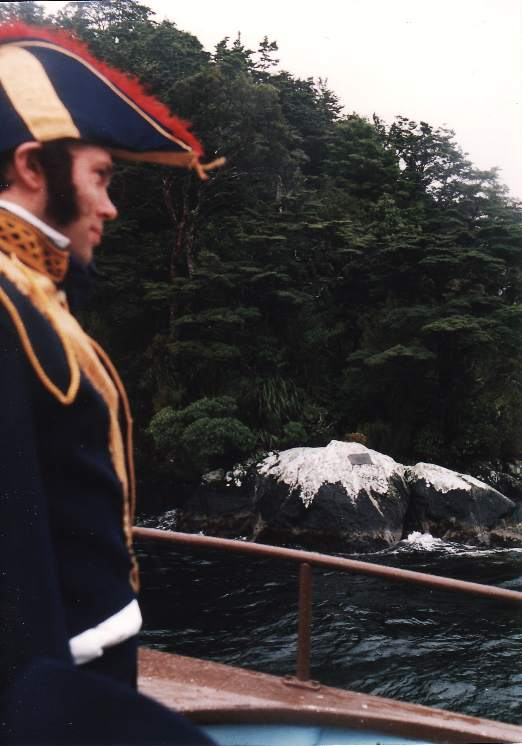
Spanish Landing Site, Bauza Island, New Zealand

From 15 September 1786 to 18 May 1788 Malaspina made a commercial circumnavigation of the world on behalf of the Royal Company of the Philippines. During this voyage he was in command of the frigate Astrea. His route went via Cape Horn and, returning, the Cape of Good Hope. In February 1787, the Astrea called at Concepción in Chile, whose military governor, the Irish-born Ambrosio O'Higgins, had six months before recommended that Spain organize an expedition to the Pacific similar to those led by Lapérouse and Cook. O'Higgins had made this recommendation following the visit of the Lapérouse expedition to Concepción in March 1786, and presumably discussed it with Malaspina while the Astrea was at Concepción. Following the Astrea's return to Spain, Malaspina, in partnership with José de Bustamante and advised by Francisco Muñoz y San Clemente, produced a proposal for an expedition along the lines set out in OHiggins's memorandum. A short time later, on 14 October 1788, Malaspina was informed of the government's acceptance of his plan. José de Espinoza y Tello, one of the officers of the Malaspina expedition, subsequently confirmed the importance of the information sent by O'Higgins in stimulating the Government to initiate an extensive program of exploration in the Pacific. The prompt acceptance of Malaspina's proposal was stimulated by news that the Russian government was preparing the Mulovsky expedition to the North Pacific, which had as one objective the claiming of territory around Nootka Sound that was also claimed by Spain (see Nootka Crisis and Spanish expeditions to the Pacific Northwest).

== Expedition of 1789–1794 ==
In September 1788, Malaspina and José de Bustamante y Guerra approached the Spanish government. The explorers proposed a scientific-political expedition that would visit nearly all the Spanish possessions in America and Asia. The Spanish king, Charles III, a promoter of science in the Spanish Empire, approved.

Two corvettes were built under Malaspina's direction specifically for the expedition: Descubierta and Atrevida (meaning "Discovery" and "Daring" or "Bold"). Malaspina commanded Descubierta and Bustamante Atrevida. The names were chosen by Malaspina to honor James Cook's Discovery and Resolution. The two corvettes were constructed by the shipbuilder Tómas Muñoz at the La Carraca shipyard. They were both 306 tons burden and 36 metres long, with a normal load displacement of 4.2 metres. They were launched together on 8 April 1789.

The expedition was under the "dual command" of Malaspina and Bustamante. Although in time the expedition became known as the Malaspina's, Bustamante was never considered subordinate. Malaspina insisted on their equality, yet Bustamante early acknowledged Malaspina as the "chief of the expedition."

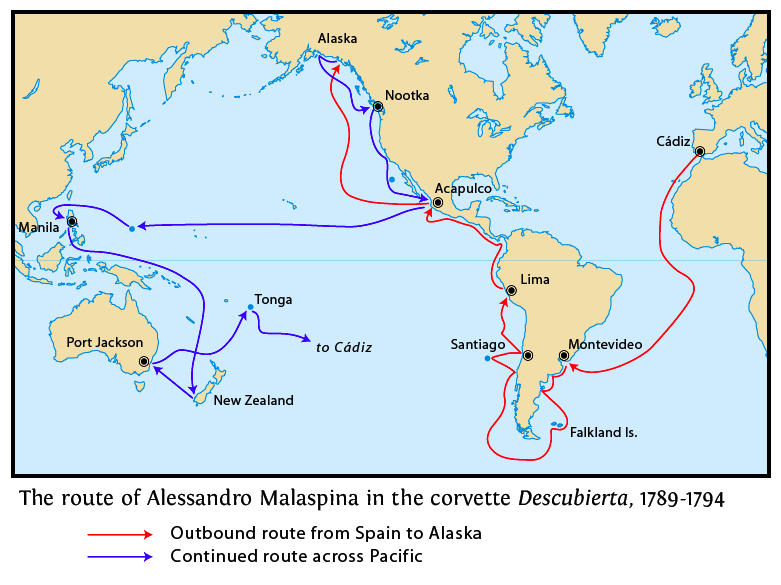
This map shows the route of Malaspina's ship Descubierta with the return to Spain from Tonga omitted. The route of Bustamante's Atrevida was mostly the same, but deviated in some places.

The expedition sailed from Cádiz on 30 July 1789. The bohemian naturalist Thaddäus Haenke missed the boat, but joined in 1790 in Santiago de Chile after crossing South America by land from Montevideo.

The expedition had explicitly scientific goals, as had the recent voyages of James Cook and Jean-François de Galaup, comte de La Pérouse. Some of the leading scientists of the day accompanied Malaspina. The scientific data collected during the expedition surpassed that of Cook, but due to changed political circumstances in Spain Malaspina was jailed upon return and the reports and collections locked up and banned from publication. The expedition and its findings remained obscure and nearly unstudied by historians until the late 20th century.

Malaspina stopped at Montevideo and Buenos Aires, investigating the political situation of the Viceroyalty of the Río de la Plata. After rounding Cape Horn, the expedition stopped at Talcahuano, the port of Concepción in present-day Chile, and again at Valparaíso, the port of Santiago. Continuing north, Bustamante mapped the coast while Malaspina sailed to the Juan Fernández Islands in order to resolve conflicting data on their location. The two captains reunited at Callao, the port of Lima. There investigations were made into the political situation of the Viceroyalty of Peru. The expedition then continued north, mapping the coast, to Acapulco, Mexico. A team of officers was sent to Mexico City to investigate the archives and political situation of the Viceroyalty of New Spain.

By the time Malaspina reached Mexico it was 1791, and there he received a dispatch from the king of Spain, ordering him to search for a Northwest Passage in the region of latitude 60 degrees N, newly thought to have been discovered many years previously. Malaspina had been planning to sail to Hawaii and Kamchatka, as well as the Pacific Northwest. Instead, he sailed from Acapulco directly to Yakutat Bay, Alaska (then known as Port Mulgrave), where the rumored passage was said to exist. Finding only an inlet, he carefully surveyed the Alaskan coast west to Prince William Sound.

At Yakutat Bay, the expedition made contact with the Tlingit. Spanish scholars made a study of the tribe, recording information on social mores, language, economy, warfare methods, and burial practices. Artists with the expedition, Tomas de Suria and José Cardero, produced portraits of tribal members and scenes of Tlingit daily life. A glacier between Yakutat Bay and Icy Bay was subsequently named after Malaspina. The botanist Luis Née also accompanied the expedition, during which he collected and described numerous new plants.

Knowing that Cook had previously surveyed the coast west of Prince William Sound and found no passage, Malaspina ceased his search at that point and sailed to the Spanish outpost at Nootka Sound on Vancouver Island.

Malaspina's expedition spent a fortnight at Nootka Sound. While at Nootka, the expedition's scientists made a study of the Nuu-chah-nulth (Nootka peoples). The relationship between the Spanish and the Nootkas was at its lowest point when Malaspina arrived. Malaspina and his crew were able greatly to improve the relationship, which was one of their objectives and reasons for stopping in the first place. Owing in part to Malaspina's ability to bequeath generous gifts from his well-supplied ships about to return to Mexico, the friendship between the Spanish and the Nootkas was strengthened. The gaining of the Nootka chief Maquinna's trust was particularly significant, as he was one of the most powerful chiefs of the region and had been very wary of the Spanish when Malaspina arrived. His friendship strengthened the Spanish claim to Nootka Sound, which was in question after the Nootka Crisis and resolved in the subsequent Nootka Conventions. The Spanish government was eager for the Nootka to agree formally that the land upon which the Spanish outpost stood had been ceded freely and legally. This desire had to do with Spain's negotiations with Britain than over Nootka Sound and the Pacific Northwest. Malaspina was able to acquire exactly what the government wanted. After weeks of negotiations the principal Nootka chief, Maquinna, agreed that the Spanish would always remain owners of the land they then occupied, and that they had acquired it with all due propriety. The outcome of the Nootka Convention depended in part on this pact.

In addition to the expedition's work with the Nootkas, astronomical observations were made to fix the location of Nootka Sound and calibrate the expedition's chronometers. Nootka Sound was surveyed and mapped with an accuracy far greater than had previously been available. Unexplored channels were investigated. The maps were also linked to the baseline established by Captain Cook, allowing calibration between Spanish and British charts. Botanical studies were carried out, including an attempt to make a type of beer out of spruce needles that was hoped to have anti-scorbutic properties for combating scurvy. The expedition ships took on water and wood, and provided the Spanish outpost with many useful goods, including medicines, food, various tools and utensils, and a Réaumur scale thermometer.

After departing Nootka Sound the two ships sailed south, stopping at the Spanish settlement and mission at Monterey, California, before returning to Mexico.

In 1792, back in Mexico, Malaspina dispatched two schooners (or "goletas") to conduct more detailed explorations of the Strait of Juan de Fuca and the Strait of Georgia. These were Sutíl, commanded by Dionisio Alcalá Galiano, and Mexicana, under Cayetano Valdés y Flores. Both were officers subordinate to Malaspina. The ships were to have been commanded by two pilots of San Blas, Mexico, but Malaspina arranged for his own officers to replace them.

In 1792, Malaspina's expedition sailed from Mexico across the Pacific Ocean. They stopped briefly at Guam before arriving at the Philippines, where they spent several months, mostly at Manila. During this period Malaspina sent Bustamante in the Atrevida to Macau, China.

After Bustamante's return the expedition left the Philippines and sailed to New Zealand. They explored Doubtful Sound at the southern end of New Zealand's South Island, mapping and carrying out gravity experiments. Then Malaspina sailed to Port Jackson (Sydney). on the coast of New South Wales Australia, which had been established by the British in 1788. During the expedition's stay at Sydney Cove, New South Wales, in March–April 1793, Thaddäus Haenke carried out observations and made collections relating to the natural history of the place, as he reported to the colony's patron, Sir Joseph Banks, saying: "I here express the public testimony of a grateful soul for the very extraordinary humanity and kindness with which the English in their new Colony welcomed us wandering vagabonds, Ulysses' companions. A Nation renowned throughout the world, which has left nothing untried, will also overcome with the happiest omens, by the most assiduous labour and by its own determined spirit the great obstacles opposing it in the foundation of what may one day become another Rome."

During its visit to Port Jackson, twelve drawings were done by members of the expedition, which are a valuable record of the settlement in its early years, especially as among them are the only depictions of the convict settlers from this period.

The recently founded British colony had been included in the expedition's itinerary in response to a memorandum drawn up in September 1788 by one of Malaspina's fellow naval officers, Francisco Muñoz y San Clemente, who warned of the dangers it posed to the Spanish possessions in the Pacific in peacetime from the development of a contraband commerce and in war time as a base for British naval operations. Muñoz said: "The colonists will be able to fit out lucrative privateers so as to cut all communication between the Philippines and both Americas.... These possessions will have a navy of their own, obtaining from the Southern region whatever is necessary to establish it, and when they have it ready formed they will be able to invade our nearby possessions ..." In the confidential report he wrote following his visit, Malaspina echoed the warning from Muñoz, writing of the "terrible" future danger for Spain from the British colony at Port Jackson,

from whence with the greatest ease a crossing of two or three months through healthy climates, and a secure navigation, could bring to our defenceless coasts two or three thousand castaway bandits to serve interpolated with an excellent body of regular troops. It would not be surprising that in this case—the women also sharing the risks as well as the sensual pleasures of the men—the history of the invasions of the Huns and Alans in the most fertile provinces of Europe would be revived in our surprised colonies... The pen trembles to record the image, however distant, of such disorders.

While recognizing the strategic threat it posed to Spain's Pacific possessions in time of war, Malaspina wrote: "It is not the concern of these paragraphs to demonstrate in detail the many schemes for these projected plunderings, so much as the easiest ways of preventing them." He preferred the peaceable approach of drawing attention to the commercial opportunity the new colony offered for a trade in food and livestock from Chile and the development of a viable trade route linking that country with the Philippines. Having seen carts and even ploughs being drawn by convicts for want of draught animals in the colony, and having eaten meals with the colonists at which beef and mutton were regarded as rare luxuries, Malaspina saw the trade in Chilean livestock as the key to a profitable commerce. He proposed that an agreement be signed with London for an Association of Traders, and for an agent of the colony to be resident in Chile. Conscious that the policy he was proposing was a bold and imaginative one in the face of Spain's traditional insistence on a national monopoly of trade and other relations within her empire, Malaspina declared that "this affair is exceedingly favourable to the commercial balance of our Colonies," and it would have the advantage of calming and tranquilizing "a lively, turbulent and even insolent neighbour....not with sacrifices on our part but rather with many and very considerable profits."

Returning east across the Pacific Ocean the expedition spent a month at Vava'u, the northern archipelago of Tonga. From there they sailed to Callao, Peru, then Talcahuanco, Chile. The fjords of southern Chile were carefully mapped before the expedition rounded Cape Horn. Then they surveyed the Falkland Islands (Spanish: Islas Malvinas) and the coast of Patagonia before stopping again at Montevideo.

From Montevideo Malaspina took a long route through the central Atlantic Ocean to Spain, reaching Cádiz on September 21, 1794. He had spent 62 months at sea.

During the five years of this expedition Malaspina fixed the measurements of America's western coast with a precision never before achieved. He measured the height of Mount Saint Elias in Alaska and explored gigantic glaciers, including Malaspina Glacier, later named after him. He demonstrated the feasibility of a possible Panama Canal and outlined plans for its construction. In addition, Malaspina's expedition was the first major long distance sea voyage that experienced virtually no scurvy. Malaspina's medical officer, Pedro González, was convinced that fresh oranges and lemons were essential for preventing scurvy. Only one outbreak occurred, during a 56-day trip across the open sea. Five sailors came down with symptoms, one seriously. After three days at Guam all five were healthy again. James Cook had made great progress against the disease, but other British captains, such as George Vancouver, found his accomplishment difficult to replicate. It had been known since the mid-18th century that citrus fruit was effective, but for decades it was impractical to store fruit or fruit juice for long periods on ships without losing the necessary ascorbic acid. Spain's large empire and many ports of call made it easier to acquire fresh fruit.

== Political controversy and exile ==
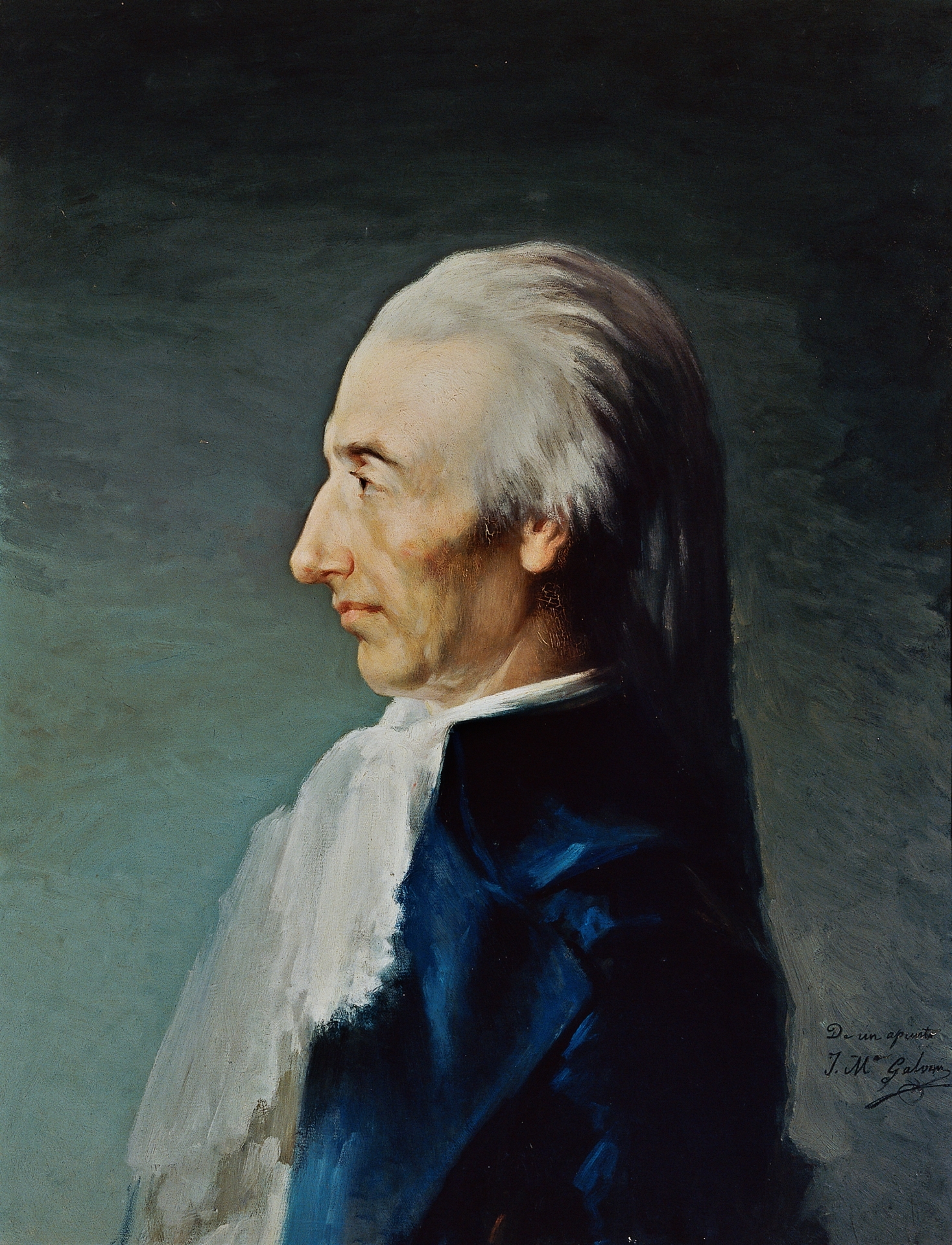
Portrait of Malaspina by José María Galván

In December 1794 Malaspina met with King Charles IV and Prime Minister Manuel de Godoy. At first all was well and Malaspina was promoted to fleet-brigadier in March 1795.

In September 1795, he sent his writings to the Spanish government, but the latter judged their publication to be inopportune in the then existing political situation. Disenchanted, Malaspina led a philosophical-literary polemic in the Madrid press on the meaning of beauty in nature, and at the same time took part in a secret conspiracy to overthrow Manuel Godoy. In his examination of the political situation in the Spanish colonies Malaspina had decided that Spain should free its colonies and form a confederation of states bound by international trade. In September 1795 he began trying to influence the Spanish government with such proposals. Unfortunately Malaspina had lost the support he used to have at the royal court before his voyage and the political situation had changed radically, due in part to the French Revolution. He was accused by Prime Minister Godoy of being part of a conspiracy to overthrow him, and arrested on November 23 on charges of plotting against the state. After an inconclusive trial on April 20, 1796, Charles IV decreed that Malaspina be stripped of rank and imprisoned in the isolated fortress of San Antón in La Coruña, Galicia. Malaspina remained in the prison from 1796 to 1802. During his incarceration he wrote a variety of essays on topics such as aesthetics, economics, and literary criticism. Francesco Melzi d'Eril and later, through him, Napoleon campaigned for Malaspina's release. He was finally freed at the end of 1802 but was exiled from Spain. He left for his hometown of Mulazzo via the port of Genoa, and settled in nearby Pontremoli.

Because of Spain's conflict with revolutionary France, there were no funds in the naval budget for publishing his seven-volume account of the 1789–94 expeditions: it remained unpublished until the late 19th century (apart from a Russian translation by Adam von Krusenstern in successive issues of the official journal of the Russian Admiralty between 1824 and 1827). A large portion of the documents meant to be used as source material for the publication of Malaspina's expedition remained scattered in archives to the present day. A significant number of documents are lost, and those that survive are often in a rough, semi-edited form. Alexander von Humboldt, an admirer of Malaspina, wrote, "this able navigator is more famous for his misfortunes than for his discoveries." There was some contemporary publication, but it took two hundred years for the bulk of the records of the expedition to be published. The notes made by the expedition's botanist, Luis Née, while he was at Port Jackson in 1793, were published in 1800. Dionisio Alcalá Galiano's journal of his survey of the straits between Vancouver Island and the mainland, carried out as part of the Malaspina expedition, was published in 1802 with all mention of Malaspina's name excised. In 1809, José Espinosa y Tello published the astronomical and geodesic observations made during the expedition in a two-volume work that also contained an abbreviated narrative of the voyage. This narrative was translated into Russian and published by Admiral Adam von Krusenstern in St. Petersburg in 1815. The journal of Malaspina's voyage was first published in Russian translation by Krusenstern in successive issues of the official journal of the Russian Admiralty between 1824 and 1827 (a copy of the manuscript had been obtained by the Russian ambassador in Madrid in 1806). The journal of Francisco Xavier de Viana, second-in-command of the Atrevida, was published in Montevideo in 1849. Bustamante's journal was published in 1868 in the official journal of the Directorate of Hydrography. An abbreviated account of the Malaspina expedition, consisting mostly of his journal, "Diario de Viaje," was published in Madrid in 1885 by Pedro de Novo y Colson. Malaspina's journal was published in another edition in Madrid in 1984. The definitive version of the expedition was finally published in Spain by the Museo Naval and Ministerio de Defensa in nine volumes from 1987 to 1999. The second volume of this series, Malaspina's journal, was published in an annotated English translation by the Hakluyt Society in association with the Museo Naval between 2001 and 2005.

The drawings and paintings done by members of the expedition were described by Carmen Sotos Serrano in 1982. The 4,000-odd manuscripts relating to the expedition were catalogued by María Dolores Higueras Rodríguez between 1989 and 1994.

== Later life ==
In Pontremoli, which by then was part of the short-lived Kingdom of Etruria, Malaspina concerned himself with local politics. In December 1803 he organized a quarantine between the Napoleonic Italian Republic and the Kingdom of Etruria during a yellow fever epidemic in Livorno. In 1805 he received the title of Advising Auditor of the Council of State of the Kingdom of Italy. The Queen of Etruria received him at court in December 1806. Shortly afterwards he was admitted to the Columban Society in Florence with the title of Addomesticato.

The first appearance of an incurable illness occurred in 1807. Malaspina died in Pontremoli on 9 April 1810, at the age of 55. His death was noted in the Gazzetta di Genova, 18 April 1810:

Pontremoli, 9 April 1810: Today at 10 o'clock in the evening the learned and famous navigator Signore Alexandro Malaspina of Mulazzo passed from this life. Such a loss cannot fail to be felt far and wide by all those who, placing high value on the importance of the nautical and travel accounts of this most talented Italian, have known his equanimity in both good and bad fortune; it is without doubt most bitter for those who witnessed the end from close by and who, moreover, had to admire his fortitude in suffering patiently to the very last the most severe pains of a long intestinal illness.

== Legacy ==
Malaspina University-College and Malaspina International High School in the Canadian city of Nanaimo, British Columbia took their names indirectly from the explorer (although these names have been recently changed to Vancouver Island University and the High School at VIU), by way of Malaspina Strait, between Texada Island and the mainland, and the Malaspina Peninsula and adjoining Malaspina Inlet nearby, which are the location of Malaspina Provincial Park and are part of the Sunshine Coast region. Vancouver Island University is home to the Alexandro Malaspina Research Centre.

There is also a Malaspina Peak and Malaspina Lake near Nootka Sound on Vancouver Island, just southeast of the town of Gold River; and the well-known Malaspina Glacier in southern Alaska.

Another lasting legacy of Malaspina’s time in South America is the abundance of the Malaspina surname in Peru, specifically in Lima and in the Ancash region. Malaspina in Lima is akin to Smith in the United States, and most Malaspina families proudly trace their lineage back to Alessandro Malaspina.

In New Zealand, Malaspina Reach of Doubtful Sound in Fiordland, explored by him in 1793, has his name.

== See also ==
- European and American voyages of scientific exploration
- José de Moraleda y Montero, Spanish Navy explorer contemporary with Malaspina

== Notes and references ==
=== Bibliography ===
English

- Iris H.W. Engstrand, Spanish Scientists in the New World: The Eighteenth Century Expeditions, Seattle, Univ. Washington Press, 1981.
- Edith C. Galbraith, "Malaspina's Voyage around the World", California Historical Society Quarterly, vol.3, no.3, October 1924, pp. 215 37.
- Robin Inglis (ed.), Spain and the North Pacific Coast, Vancouver Maritime Museum Society, 1992.
- Robin Inglis, "Successors and rivals to Cook: the French and the Spaniards", in Glyndwr Williams (ed.), Captain Cook: Explorations and Assessments, Woodbridge, The Boydell Press, 2004, pp. 161–178.

Non-English

- Juanma Sánchez Arteaga (2022). Lo bello en la naturaleza. Alejandro Malaspina : estética, filosofía natural y blancura en el ocaso de la Ilustración (1795-1803). Madrid: Consejo Superior de Investigaciones Científicas. ISBN 978-84-00-11002-4.
- Mariana Cuesta Domingo, "Espinosa y Tello y su viaje complementario al de Malaspina," in Paz Martin Ferrero (ed.), Actas del simposium CCL aniversario nacimiento de Joseph Celestino Mutis, Cádiz, Diputación Provincial de Cádiz, 1986, pp. 197–204.
- Mª Dolores Higueras Rodriguez, Diario General del Viaje Corbeta Atrevida por José Bustamante y Guerra, Museo Naval Ministerio de Defensa La Expedición Malaspina, 1789–1794, Tomo IX, Madrid y Barcelona, Lunwerg Editores, 1999.
- Victoria Ibáñez, Trabajos Cientificos y Correspondencia de Tadeo Haenke, Museo Naval y Ministerio de Defensa, La Expedición Malaspina, 1789–1794, Tomo IV, Madrid y Barcelona, Lunwerg Editores, 1992.
- Dario Manfredi, "Adam J. Krusenstern y la primera edición del viaje de Malaspina. San Petersburgo (1824–1827)", Derroteros de la Mar del Sur, (Lima), Año 8, núm.8, 2000, pp. 65–82.
- Dario Manfredi, Italiano in Spagna, Spagnolo in Italia: Alessandro Malaspina (1754–1810) e la più importante spedizione scientifica marittima del Secolo dei Luni, Torino, Nuova Eri Edizioni Rai, 1992.
- Dario Manfredi, "Sulla Prima Edizione del Viaggio di Malaspina S. Pietroburgo, 1824–1827", Giovanni Caboto e le Vie dell’Atlantico settentrionale, Atti del Convegno Internazionale de Studi, Roma, 29 settembre-1 ottobre 1997, Genova-Brigati, Centro italiano per gli Studi storico-geografici, 1999, pp. 485–159.
- Dario Manfredi, Alessandro Malaspina e Fabio Ala Ponzone: Lettere dal Vecchio e Nuovo Mondo (1788–1803), Bologna, il Mulino, 1999.
- Dario Manfredi, "Sugli Studi e sulle Navigazioni ‘minori’di Alessandro Malaspina", Cronaca e Storia di Val di Magra, XVI-XVII, 1987–1988, p. 159.
- Dario Manfredi, Il Viaggio Attorno al Mondo di Malaspina con la Fregata di S.M.C.«Astrea», 1786–1788, La Spezia, Memorie della Accademia Lunigianese di Scienze, 1988.
- Luis Rafael Martínez-Cañavate, Trabajos Astronomicos, Geodesicos e Hidrograficos, Museo Naval y Ministerio de Defensa, La Expedición Malaspina, 1789–1794, Tomo VI, Madrid y Barcelona, Lunwerg Editores, 1994.
- Felix Muñoz Garmendia, Diario y Trabajos Botánicos de Luis Née, Museo Naval y Ministerio de Defensa, La Expedición Malaspina, 1789–1794, Tomo III, Madrid y Barcelona, Lunwerg Editores, 1992.
- Antonio Orozco Acuaviva (ed.), La Expedición Malaspina (1789–1794), Bicentenario de la Salida de Cádiz, Cádiz, Real Academia Hispano-Americana, 1989. In the contribution to this work by Pablo Anton Sole, "Los Padrones de Cumplimiento Pascual de la Expedición Malaspina: 1790–1794", pp. 173–238, the names of all of the 450 personnel who took part in the several stages of the expedition are listed.
- Antonio Orozco Acuaviva et al. (eds.), Malaspina y Bustamante '94: II Jornadas Internacionales Conmemorativas del regreso de la Expedición a Cádiz, 1794–1994, Madrid, Rustica, 1996.
- Mercedes Palau Baquero & Antonio Orozco Acuaviva (eds.), Malaspina '92: I Jornadas Internacionales – Madrid, Cádiz, La Coruña. 17–25 de Septiembre de 1992, Cádiz, Real Academia Hispano-Americana, 1994.
- Juan Pimentel Igea, Examines Politicos, Museo Naval y Ministerio de Defensa, La Expedición Malaspina, 1789–1794, Tomo VII, Barcelona, Lunwerg Editores, 1996.
- Blanca Saiz, Bibliografia sobre Alejandro Malaspina y acerca de la expedicion Malaspina y de los marinos y cientificos que en ella participaron, Ediciones El Museo Universal, Madrid, 1992.
- Blanca Sáiz (ed.), Malaspina '93: Alessandro Malaspina e la sua spedizione scientifica (1789–1794). Atti del Congresso Internazionale, nel bicentenario della massima impresa di Alessandro Malaspina, tenutosi a Mulazzo, Castiglione del Terziere e Lerici dal 24 al 26 settembre 1993, Mulazzo, Centro di Studi Malaspiniani, 1995.
- Emilio Soler Pascual, La Conspiración Malaspina, 1795–1796, Alicante, Instituto de Cultural"Juan Gil Albert", 1965 (Diputación Provincial, Col. Ensayo y Investigación: 32).
- Emilio Soler Pascual y Asociación Cultural Dionisio Alcalá-Galiano, Trafalgar y Alcalá Galiano: jornadas internacionales, Cabra, 17 al 23 de octubre de 2005, Madrid, Agencia Española de Cooperación Internacional, 2006, Series: Ciencias y humanismo.
- Carlo Ferrari / Dario Manfredi, Dallo "Zibaldone Ferrari" nuovi elementi sulle letture di Alessandro Malaspina (1796-1810) Estratto dall'"Archivio Storico per le Province Parmensi". Quarta serie, vol. XL - Anno 1988.
