= Malaspina Expedition =

Maritime scientific exploration (1789–1794)

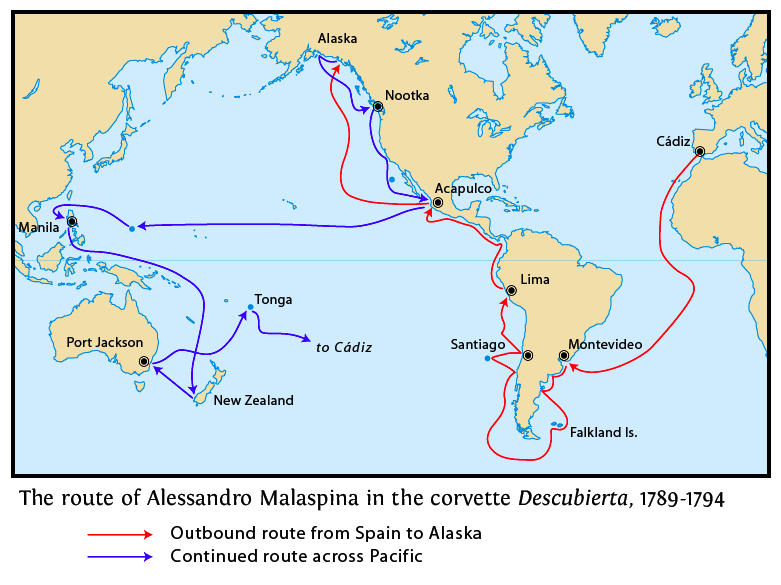
Map showing the route of Malaspina's ship Descubierta with the return to Spain from Tonga omitted. The route of Bustamante's Atrevida was mostly the same, but deviated in some places.

The Malaspina Expedition (1789–1794) was a five-year maritime scientific exploration commanded by Alejandro Malaspina and José de Bustamante y Guerra. Although the expedition receives its name from Malaspina, he always insisted on giving Bustamante an equal share of command. Bustamante had, however, acknowledged Malaspina as the "head of the expedition" since the beginning.

The expedition was funded by the Spanish government and originally pursued strictly scientific goals, in the same fashion as the voyages of James Cook and Jean-François de Galaup, comte de La Pérouse. Some of the leading scientists at the time collected an impressive amount of scientific data that even surpassed what was collected during Cook's expedition, but due to Malaspina's involvement in a conspiracy to overthrow the government, he was jailed shortly upon return. Most of the expedition's reports and collections were put away unpublished, and did not see the light of day until the late 19th century.

== History ==
=== Background and preparation ===
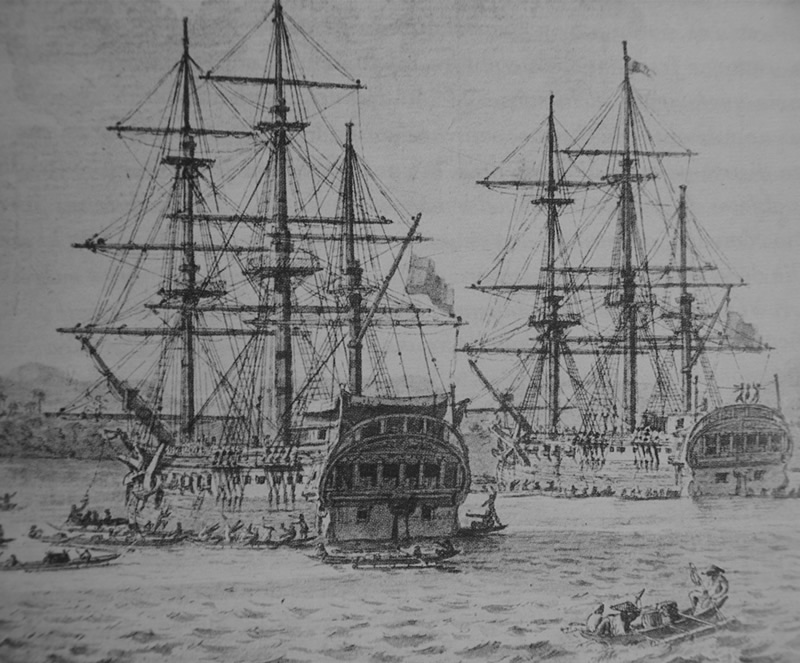
The corvettes Atrevida and Descubierta.

From September 1786 to May 1788 Malaspina made a commercial circumnavigation of the world on behalf of the Royal Company of the Philippines. During this voyage he was in command of the frigate Astrea. His route went via the Cape of Good Hope and, returning, Cape Horn. Astrea called at Concepción, Chile, in February 1787, whose military governor, the Irish-born Ambrose O'Higgins, had recommended six months before that Spain organize an expedition to the Pacific similar to those led by Lapérouse and Cook. O'Higgins had made this recommendation following the visit of the Lapérouse expedition to Concepcion in March 1786, and presumably discussed it with Malaspina while the Astrea was at Concepcion. Following the Astrea's return to Spain, Malaspina produced, in partnership with José de Bustamante, a proposal for an expedition along the lines set out in O'Higgins' memorandum. A short time later, on 14 October 1788, Malaspina was informed of the government's acceptance of his plan. José de Espinoza y Tello, one of the officers of the Malaspina expedition, subsequently confirmed the importance of the information sent by O'Higgins in stimulating the Government to initiate an extensive program of exploration in the Pacific. The prompt acceptance of Malaspina's proposal was also stimulated by news from Saint Petersburg of preparations for a Russian expedition (the Mulovsky expedition) to the North Pacific under the command of Grigori I. Mulovsky that had as one of its objectives the claiming of territory on the north west coast of North America around Nootka Sound that was also claimed at the time by Spain.

The Spanish government had the largest scientific budget of any European state at the time. In the last four decades of the eighteenth century, a number of scientific expeditions had crossed the Spanish Empire, including botanical expeditions to New Granada, Mexico, Peru and Chile, and making an enormous collection of the American flora. They saw the New World as a vast laboratory for study and an unending source of samples.

The Spanish king, Charles III, was known for his fascination with science, and had already procured funds to further develop science and technology in several areas. He promptly approved the expedition, although he would never see its results, as he died exactly two months later.

Additionally, the Spanish government had a vested interest on all issues concerning the Pacific Ocean because a large number of her colonies were in that area, including most of the American Pacific coast, the Philippines, and several islands, such as Guam.

Two frigates were specially designed and built for the expedition by the shipbuilder Tómas Muñoz at the La Carraca shipyard, under Malaspina's direction. They were both 306 tons burden and 36 metres long, with a normal load displacement of 4.2 metres. They were launched together on 8 April 1789 and were baptized in honor of former James Cook's ships Resolution and Discovery as Descubierta and Atrevida (a liberal translation in Spanish). Malaspina commanded Descubierta and Bustamante Atrevida.

The expedition carried on board the elite of astronomers and surveyors of the Spanish Navy, headed by Juan Gutiérrez de la Concha, with the young Felipe Bauzá as cartographer. Also on board were many scientists and artists, such as painting master José del Pozo, artists José Guío, Fernando Brambila and Giovanni Ravenet, cartoonist and columnist Tomás de Suria, botanists Luis Née, Antonio Pineda and Thaddäus Haenke, and many others.

=== The Expedition ===
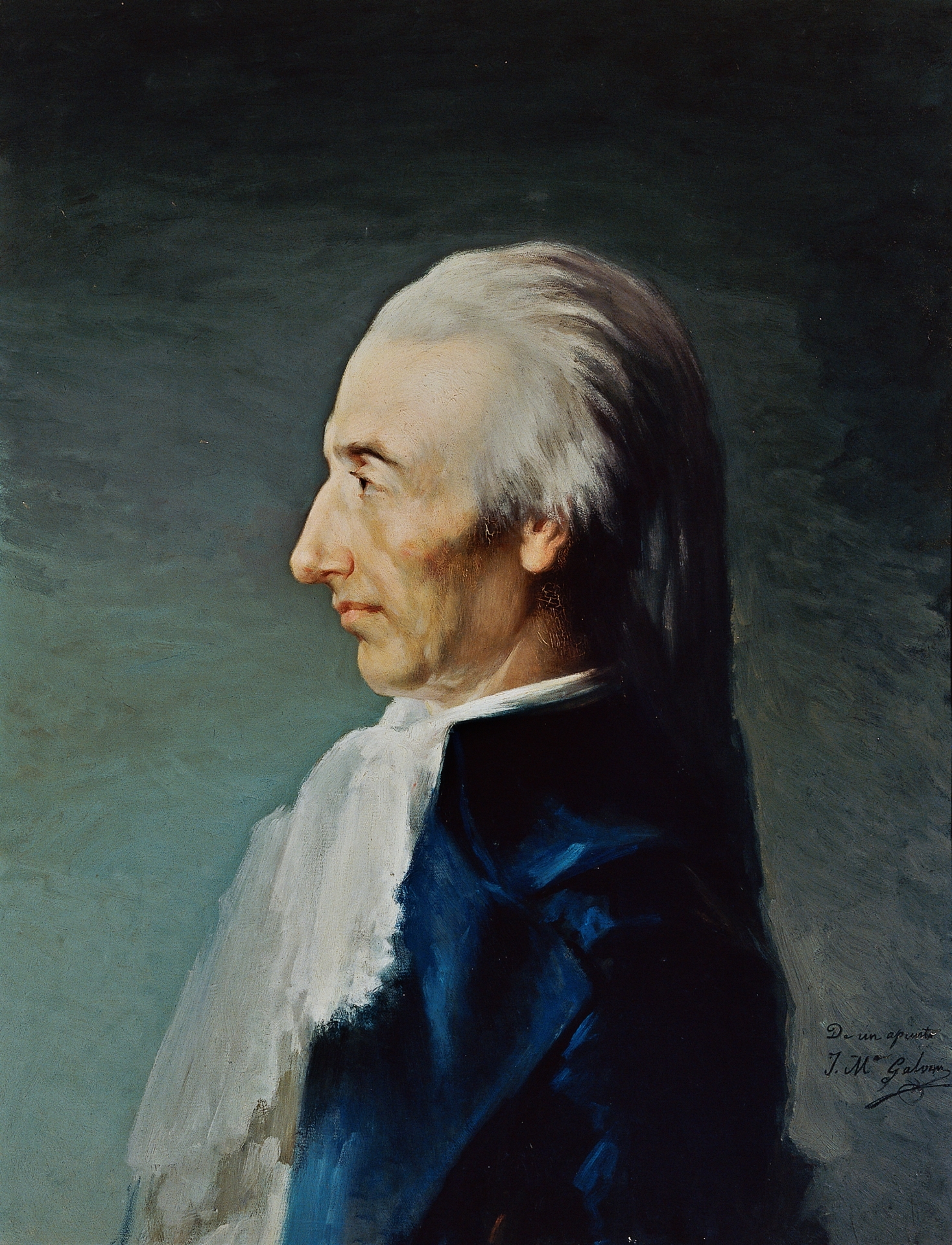
Portrait of Alejandro Malaspina by José María Galván

The Atrevida and Descubierta sailed from Cádiz on 30 July 1789, and after anchoring for a few days off the Canary Islands, proceeded to sail across the Atlantic Ocean, to the coasts of South America. Once there, they sailed down to Río de la Plata, and stopped in Montevideo and Buenos Aires, in order to prepare a report on the political situation of the Viceroyalty of the Río de la Plata. Then they sailed over to the Falkland Islands, and from there they headed towards Cape Horn, crossing to the Pacific Ocean on November 13, and stopping at Talcahuano, the port of Concepción in present-day Chile, and again at Valparaíso, the port of Santiago.

Continuing north, Bustamante mapped the coast while Malaspina sailed to Juan Fernández Islands in order to resolve conflicting data on their location. The two ships reunited at Callao, the port of Lima, in Peru, where they carried out investigations about the political situation of the Viceroyalty of Peru. The expedition then continued north, mapping the coast, to Acapulco, Mexico. A team of officers was then sent to Mexico City to investigate the archives and political situation of the Viceroyalty of New Spain.

Being in Mexico, the expedition received an order from the new king of Spain Charles IV, to search for a Northwest Passage recently rumored to have been discovered, which forced Malaspina to abandon his plans to sail to Hawaii, Kamchatka, and the Pacific Northwest. Instead, he sailed from Acapulco directly to Yakutat Bay, Alaska (then known as Port Mulgrave), where the rumored passage was said to exist. Finding only an inlet, he carefully surveyed the Alaskan coast west to Prince William Sound.

At Yakutat Bay, the expedition made contact with the Tlingit. Spanish scholars made a study of the tribe, recording information on social mores, language, economy, warfare methods, and burial practices. Artists with the expedition, Tomas de Suria and José Cardero, produced portraits of tribal members and scenes of Tlingit daily life. A glacier between Yakutat Bay and Icy Bay was subsequently named Malaspina Glacier. Botanist Luis Née collected and described numerous new plants during that time.

Knowing that Cook had previously surveyed the coast west of Prince William Sound and found no passage, Malaspina ceased his search at that point and sailed to the Spanish outpost at Nootka Sound on Vancouver Island. Malaspina's expedition spent a month at Nootka Sound. While at Nootka, the expedition's scientists made a study of the Nuu-chah-nulth (Nootka peoples). The relationship between the Spanish and the Nootkas was at its lowest point when Malaspina arrived. Malaspina and his crew were able to greatly improve the relationship, which was one of their objectives and reasons for stopping in the first place. Due in part to Malaspina's ability to bequeath generous gifts from his well-supplied ships about to return to Mexico, the friendship between the Spanish and the Nootkas was strengthened. The gaining of the Nootka chief Maquinna's trust was particularly significant, as he was one of the most powerful chiefs of the region and had been very wary of the Spanish when Malaspina arrived. His friendship strengthened the Spanish claim to Nootka Sound, which was in question after the Nootka Crisis and resolved in the subsequent Nootka Conventions. The Spanish government was eager for the Nootka to formally agree that the land upon which the Spanish outpost stood had been ceded freely and legally. This desire had to do with Spain's negotiations with Britain than over Nootka Sound and the Pacific Northwest. Malaspina was able to acquire exactly what the government wanted. After weeks of negotiations the principal Nootka chief, Maquinna, agreed that the Spanish would always remain owners of the land they then occupied, and that they had acquired it with all due properness. The outcome of the Nootka Convention depended in part on this pact.

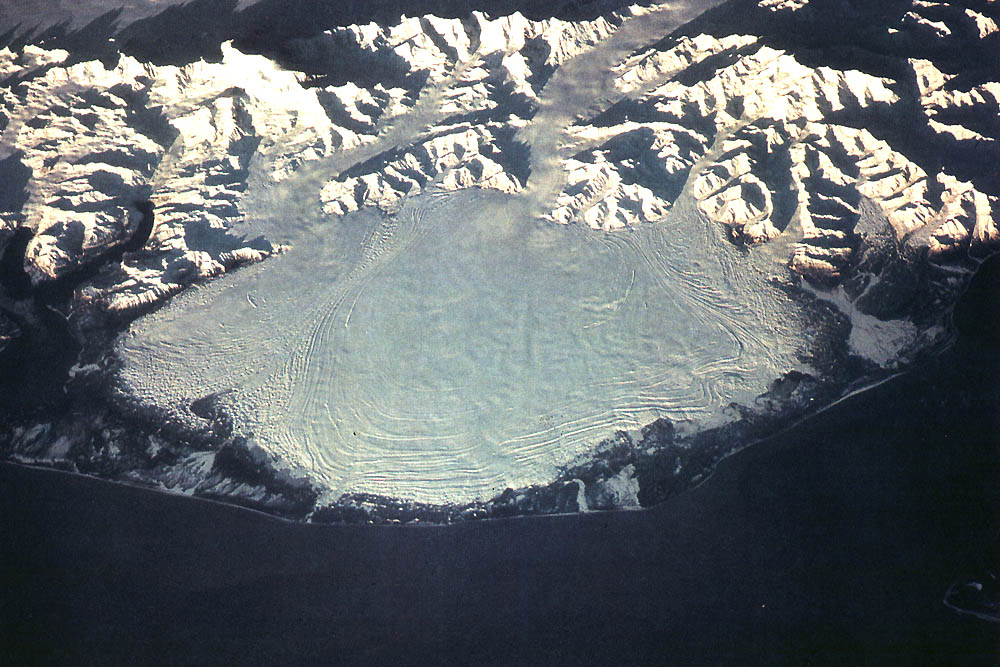
Malaspina Glacier in Alaska.

In addition to the expedition's work with the Nootkas, astronomical observations were made to fix the location of Nootka Sound and calibrate the expedition's chronometers. Nootka Sound was surveyed and mapped with an accuracy far greater than had previously been available. Unexplored channels were investigated. The maps were also linked to the baseline established by Captain Cook, allowing calibration between Spanish and British charts. Botanical studies were carried out, including an attempt to make a type of beer out of conifer needles that was hoped to have anti-scorbutic properties for combating scurvy. The expedition ships took on water and wood, and provided the Spanish outpost with many useful goods, including medicines, food, various tools and utensils, and a Réaumur scale thermometer.

After departing Nootka Sound the two ships sailed south, stopping at the Spanish settlement and mission at Monterey, California, before returning to Mexico.

In 1792, back in Mexico, Malaspina dispatched two schooners (or "goletas") to conduct more detailed explorations of the Strait of Juan de Fuca and the Strait of Georgia. These were Sutíl, commanded by Dionisio Alcalá Galiano, and Mexicana, under Cayetano Valdés y Flores. Both were officers of Malaspina's. The ships were to have been commanded by two pilots of San Blas, Mexico, but Malaspina arranged for his own officers to replace them.

In 1792, Malaspina's expedition sailed from Mexico across the Pacific Ocean. They stopped briefly at Guam before arriving at the Philippines, where they spent several months, mostly at Manila. During this period Malaspina sent Bustamante in the Atrevida to Macau, China.

After Bustamante's return the expedition left the Philippines and sailed to New Zealand. They explored Doubtful Sound at the southern end of New Zealand's South Island, mapping its entrance and lower reaches but failing because of adverse weather to carry out the gravity experiments which were the reason for going there. Although the expedition stayed for only a day. it left behind a unique cluster of Spanish place names, such as Febrero Point (from the month of his visit – February), Bauza Island (after his cartographer) and Marcaciones Point (Observation Point).

Then Malaspina sailed to Port Jackson (Sydney) on the coast of New South Wales (Australia), which had been established by the British in 1788. During the expedition’s stay at Sydney Cove, New South Wales, in March–April 1793, Thaddäus Haenke carried out observations and made collections relating to the natural history of the place, as he reported to the colony’s patron, Sir Joseph Banks, saying: "I here express the public testimony of a grateful soul for the very extraordinary humanity and kindness with which the English in their new Colony welcomed us wandering vagabonds, Ulysses' companions. A Nation renowned throughout the world, which has left nothing untried, will also overcome with the happiest omens, by the most assiduous labour and by its own determined spirit the great obstacles opposing it in the foundation of what may one day become another Rome".

During its visit to Port Jackson, twelve drawings were done by members of the expedition, which are a valuable record of the settlement in its early years, especially as among them are the only depictions of the convict settlers from this period. The recently founded English colony had been included in the expedition’s itinerary in response to a memorandum drawn up in September 1788 by one of Malaspina’s fellow naval officers, Francisco Muñoz y San Clemente, who warned of the dangers it posed to the Spanish possessions in the Pacific in peace time from the development of a contraband commerce and in war time as a base for British naval operations. Muñoz said: "The colonists will be able to fit out lucrative privateers so as to cut all communication between the Philippines and both Americas.... These possessions will have a navy of their own, obtaining from the Southern region whatever is necessary to establish it, and when they have it ready formed they will be able to invade our nearby possessions..." In the confidential report he wrote following his visit, Malaspina echoed the warning from Muñoz, writing of the "terrible" future danger for Spain from the English colony at Port Jackson,

from whence with the greatest ease a crossing of two or three months through healthy climates, and a secure navigation, could bring to our defenceless coasts two or three thousand castaway bandits to serve interpolated with an excellent body of regular troops. It would not be surprising that in this case—the women also sharing the risks as well as the sensual pleasures of the men—the history of the invasions of the Huns and Alans in the most fertile provinces of Europe would be revived in our surprised colonies.…The pen trembles to record the image, however distant, of such disorders.

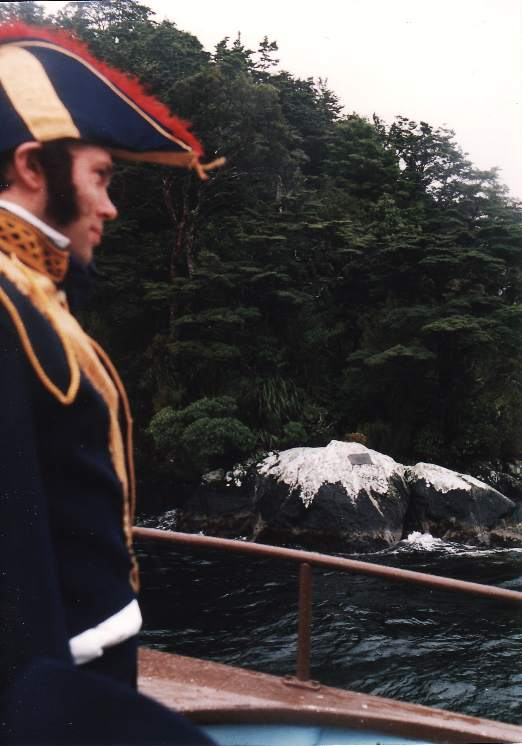
The Official Spanish Landing Plaque on Marcaciones point, Bauza Island, New Zealand

While recognizing the strategic threat it posed to Spain's Pacific possessions in time of war, Malaspina wrote: "It is not the concern of these paragraphs to demonstrate in detail the many schemes for these projected plunderings, so much as the easiest ways of preventing them". He preferred the peaceable approach of drawing attention to the commercial opportunity the new colony offered for a trade in food and livestock from Chile and the development of a viable trade route linking that country with the Philippines. Having seen carts and even ploughs being drawn by convicts for want of draught animals in the colony, and having eaten meals with the colonists at which beef and mutton were regarded as rare luxuries, Malaspina saw the trade in Chilean livestock as the key to a profitable commerce. He proposed that an agreement be signed with London for an Association of Traders, and for an agent of the colony to be resident in Chile. Conscious that the policy he was proposing was a bold and imaginative one in the face of Spain's traditional insistence on a national monopoly of trade and other relations within her empire, Malaspina declared that "this affair is exceedingly favourable to the commercial balance of our Colonies", and it would have the advantage of calming and tranquilizing "a lively, turbulent and even insolent neighbour....not with sacrifices on our part but rather with many and very considerable profits".

Returning east across the Pacific Ocean the expedition spent a month at Vava'u, the northern archipelago of Tonga. From there they sailed to Callao, Peru, then Talcahuanco, Chile. The fjords of southern Chile were carefully mapped before the expedition rounded Cape Horn. Then they surveyed the Falkland Islands and the coast of Patagonia before stopping at Montevideo again.

From Montevideo Malaspina took a long route through the central Atlantic Ocean to Spain, reaching Cádiz on September 21, 1794. He had spent 62 months at sea.

== Results of the Expedition ==
During the five years of this expedition Malaspina fixed the measurements of America's western coast with a precision never before achieved. He measured the height of Mount Saint Elias in Alaska and explored gigantic glaciers, including Malaspina Glacier, later named after him. He demonstrated the feasibility of a possible Panama Canal and outlined plans for its construction. In addition, Malaspina's expedition was the first major long distance sea voyage that experienced virtually no scurvy. Malaspina's medical officer, Pedro González, was convinced that fresh oranges and lemons were essential for preventing scurvy. Only one outbreak occurred, during a 56-day trip across the open sea. Five sailors came down with symptoms, one seriously. After three days at Guam all five were healthy again. James Cook had made great progress against the disease, but other British captains, such as George Vancouver, found his accomplishment difficult to replicate. It had been known since the mid-18th century that citrus fruit was effective, but for decades it was impractical to store fruit or fruit juice for long periods on ships without losing the necessary ascorbic acid. Spain's large empire and many ports of call made it easier to acquire fresh fruit. The City Gazette and Daily Advertiser (Charleston, South Carolina), 19 July 1797, carried a report of the expedition:

VOYAGE OF DISCOVERY: The following particulars of the last attempt of a voyage of discovery, which has made but little noise, and has not even been mentioned by an English journal, cannot fail to procure attention. A magnificent work is at this present moment in the Madrid press, containing a full and ample detail of all the transactions that occurred during this voyage of discovery; and, on its publication, we shall be gratified with an account of the manners and customs of the Babaco [Babao/Vavau] Isles, a non-descript cluster, then visited for the first time by Europeans. The two sloops called the Discovery and the Subtile, the former commanded by Don Alexander Malespina [sic], and the latter by Don Joseph de Bastamente [sic], sailed in company from the port of Cadiz, on the 30th of July, 1789, in order to co-operate with the other maritime powers in the extension of the human knowledge, and more particularly of navigation. The commanders of these vessels made correct charts of the coasts of America and the adjacent islands, from the river La Plata to Cape Horn, and from that cape to the farthermost northern extremeties [sic] of that part of the world. Their intentions in this was merely to repeat the attempts of the same kind, formerly undertaken either by foreigners or their own countrymen, and thus acquire a more minute knowledge of the subject. On their arrival at the north-west coast of America, in lat 59.60. and 61 degrees, they searched, in vain, for a passage by which they might penetrate into the Atlantic ocean; they accordingly concluded that the predictions of Cook were founded in sound reasoning, and that the gut mentioned by Maldonado, an old Spanish navigator, had no existence, except in his own brain. In the beginning of the year 1792, the Subtile, and a galliot, called the Mexicana, under the command of don Dion Galvano [Dionisio Galiano] and don Cais de Taldes [Cayetano Valdes], joined the English squadron commanded by captain Vancouver, with an intention to examine the immense Archipelago, known by the name of the Admiral’s Fonte [Admiral de Fonte], and Juan de Fuca. They continued the greater part of the year 1792 in visiting the Mariannes and Philippines, as also the Macas [Macao], on the coast of Guiana [China]. They afterwards passed between the isles Mindanoa and the isles called Mountay [Morintay], shaping course along the coasts of New-Guinea, and crossing the equator. On this occasion they discovered a gulph of about 500 maritime leagues in extent, which no former navigator had traversed. They then stopped at New-Zealand and New-Holland, and discovered in the Archipelago, called the Friendly Isles, the Babacos [Babaos/Vavau], a range of islands which had never before been seen by any European mariner. After a variety of other researches in the southern ocean, they arrived in June 1793, at Callao. From this port they made other occasional expeditions; and each separately examined the port of Conception, and the rest of the coast of America, which extends to the south-west, as well as the western coast of Moluccas [Malvinas/Malouines/Falklands]. They then entered the river La Plata, after having surmounted all the dangers incident to those southern latitudes. Having been equipped and supplied anew with provisions at Montevedia [Montevideo], they joined a fleet of frigates and register ships, and sailed for Cadiz, where they arrived after a passage of nine days [weeks], with cargoes to the amount of eight millions of dollars in money and merchandize. These voyages have not a little contributed to the extension of botany, mineralogy and navigation. In both hemispheres, and in a variety of different latitudes, many experiments were made relative to the weight of bodies [gravity], which will tend to very important discoveries, connected with the irregular form of our globe; these will also be highly useful, so far as respects a fixed and general measure [metric system]. While examining the inhabitants, our travellers collected all the monuments that could throw any light either on the migration of nations, or on their progress in civilization. Luckily for the interests of humanity, these discoveries have not caused a single tear to be shed. On the contrary, all the tribes with whom they had any connexion will bless the memory of these navigators who have furnished them with a variety of instruments, and made them acquainted with several arts, of which they were before entirely ignorant. The vessels brought back nearly the whole of their crews; neither of them, in short, lost more than three or four men; which is wonderful, if we but consider the unhealthy climates of the Torrid Zone, to which they were so long exposed. Don Antonio de Valdes, the minister of the marine, who encouraged and supported the expedition, is busied at this moment in drawing up a detailed account of this voyage, so as to render the enterprize of general utility. It will soon be published; and the curious will be gratified with charts, maps, and engravings, now preparing to accompany it. In the meantime, he has presented to the king the captains, Don Alexander Malespina [Malaspina], Don Joseph de Bastamente [Bustamante] and Don Dion Galeano [Dionisio Galiano], and lieutenant Don Carlos [Ciriaco] de Cevallos. These officers are entitled to, and will soon experience, the royal munificence.

== Aftermath ==
Unfortunately, Malaspina's political judgment led him to take part in a failed conspiracy to overthrow Spain's Prime Minister Godoy, and he was arrested on 23 November on charges of plotting against the state. After an inconclusive trial on 20 April 1796, Charles IV decreed that Malaspina be stripped of rank and imprisoned in the isolated fortress of San Antón in La Coruña, Galicia (Spain), where he remained from 1796 to 1802, when he was finally freed at the end of 1802, although on the condition that he was exiled from Spain.

It was estimated that the reports of the expedition would fill seven large volumes when published, at a cost of two million reales (250 000 Spanish dollars or about £12 500). José de Bustamante attempted to have the journal and reports of the expedition published, but the cost was beyond the resources of the Spanish treasury, particularly its naval budget, during the years of strife that followed Malaspina’s arrest. There was some contemporary publication, but it took two hundred years for the bulk of the records of the expedition to be published.

A large portion of the documents meant to be used as source material for the publication of Malaspina's expedition remained scattered in archives to the present day. A significant number of documents are lost, and those that survive are often in a rough, semi-edited form. Alexander von Humboldt, an admirer of Malaspina, wrote, "this able navigator is more famous for his misfortunes than for his discoveries." The notes made by the expedition’s botanist, Luis Née, while he was at Port Jackson in 1793 were published in 1800. Dionisio Alcalá Galiano’s journal of his survey of the straits between Vancouver Island and the mainland, carried out as part of the Malaspina expedition, was published in 1802 with all mention of Malaspina’s name excised. In 1809, José Espinosa y Tello published the astronomical and geodesic observations made during the expedition in a two-volume work that also contained an abbreviated narrative of the voyage. This narrative was translated into Russian and published by Admiral Adam Johann von Krusenstern in St Petersburg in 1815. The journal of Malaspina’s voyage was first published in Russian translation by Krusenstern in successive issues of the official journal of the Russian Admiralty between 1824 and 1827 (a copy of the manuscript had been obtained by the Russian ambassador in Madrid in 1806). The journal of Francisco Xavier de Viana, second-in-command of the Atrevida was published in Montevideo in 1849. Bustamante’s journal was published in 1868 in the official journal of the Directorate of Hydrography. An abbreviated account of the Malaspina expedition, consisting mostly of his journal, "Diario de Viaje", was published in Madrid in 1885 by Pedro de Novo y Colson. Malaspina’s journal was published in another edition in Madrid in 1984.

The definitive version of the expedition was finally published in Spain by the Museo Naval and Ministerio de Defensa in nine volumes from 1987 to 1999. The second volume of this series, Malaspina's journal, was published in an annotated English translation by the Hakluyt Society in association with the Museo Naval between 2001 and 2005. The drawings and paintings done by members of the expedition were described by Carmen Sotos Serrano in 1982. The 4,000-odd manuscripts relating to the expedition were catalogued by Maria Dolores Higueras Rodriguez between 1989 and 1994.

== Malaspina Expedition 2010 ==
In recognition to Malaspina's work, several Spanish institutions launched a major scientific expedition to circumnavigate the globe, that bears his name. The Malaspina Expedition 2010 is an interdisciplinary research project whose overall goals were to assess the impact of global change on the oceans and explore their biodiversity.

250 scientists were on board the oceanographic research vessels Hespérides and Sarmiento de Gamboa, embarking on a nine-month expedition between December 2010 and July 2011. Following the spirit of the original Malaspina Expedition, it combined pioneering scientific research with training for young researchers, while advancing marine science and fostering the public understanding of science. The voyage covered a combined 42,000 nautical miles, with calls at Miami, Rio de Janeiro, Punta Arenas, Ushuaia, Cape Town, Perth, Sydney, Honolulu, Panama, Cartagena de Indias and Cartagena, before returning to Cadiz.

The project was promoted under the umbrella of the Spanish Ministry of Science and Innovation's Consolider – Ingenio 2010 programme and is led by the Spanish National Research Council (CSIC) with the support of the Spanish Navy.

== See also ==
- Enlightenment in Spain
- Alejandro Malaspina
- Spanish Empire
- Spanish exploration of the Pacific Northwest

== Notes ==
- Meany, Edmond Stephen. "Vancouver's discovery of Puget Sound". Mystic Seaport. Archived from the original on September 27, 2007.
