= Luis Née =

French-born Spanish botanist (1735–1807)

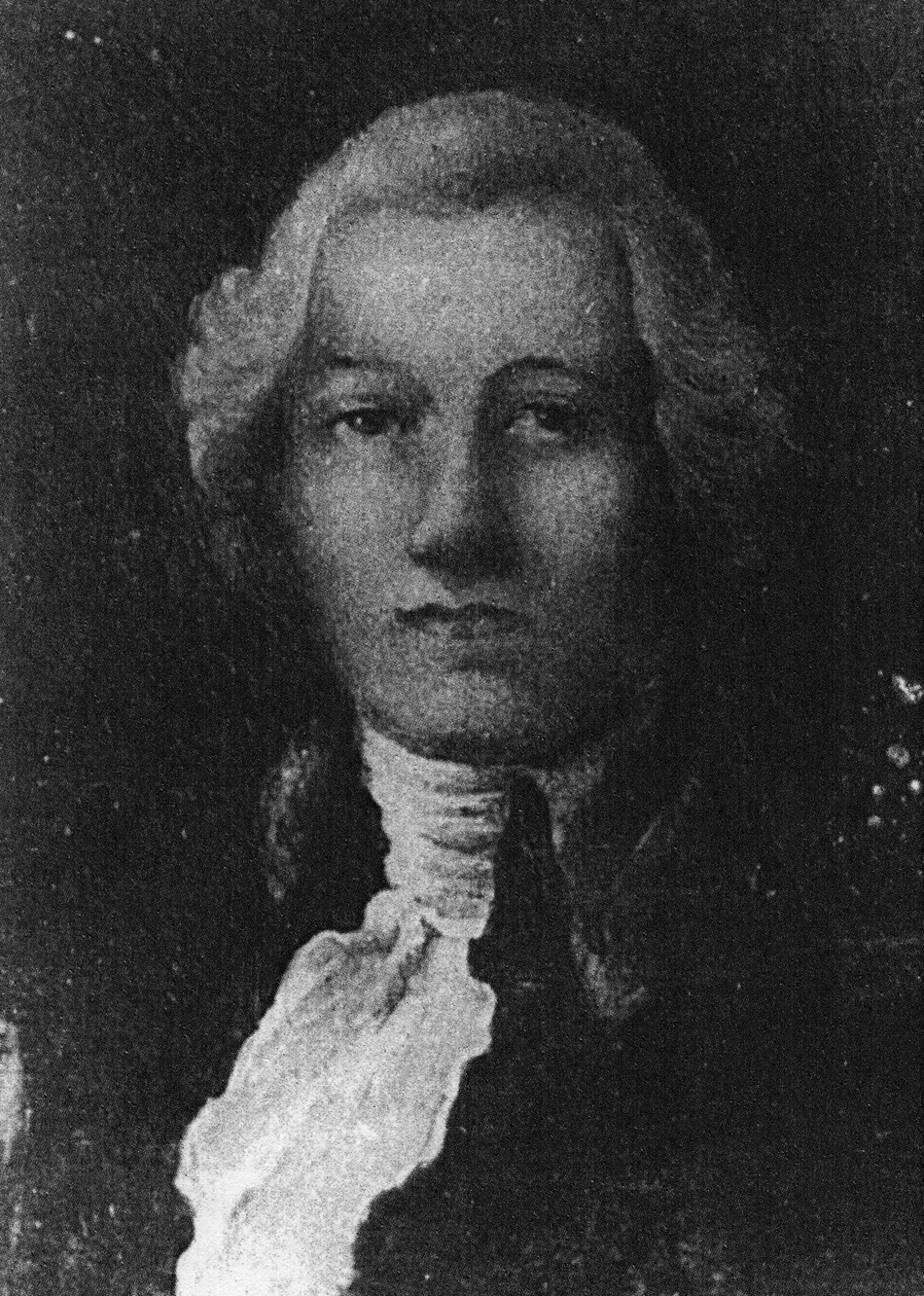
Luis Née

Luis Née (July 12, 1735 – October 3, 1807) was a French-born Spanish botanist and prolific collector of plant specimens who accompanied the Malaspina Expedition on its five-year scientific exploration of the Pacific Ocean and surrounding lands. In addition to his botanical work he was a pharmacist with a keen interest in medicinal plants and their applications.

== Early life ==
Little is known about Née's early life. He was born just outside Paris, in Le Perray-en-Yvelines, to a working-class family. He had only a basic education but from an early age exhibited an interest in botany and collecting plants. He eventually moved to Spain and later became a Spanish citizen.

By 1772 Née was working for the pharmacy at the Monastery of Nuestra Señora de la Espina and collecting plants in the mountains of Santander and Asturias. In 1777 he went to work for Casimiro Gómez Ortega, director of the botanic gardens in Madrid, collecting plants and studying in their library. In 1780 he became the head pharmacist for the field army in Gibraltar. He developed a garden of medicinal plants for the hospital in Algeciras and published his Botanical Observations made in Andalucía in 1780, 1781 and 1782. Meanwhile, Née continued to collect plants in the mountains of Málaga, Algeciras, Gibraltar, and Andalucia. In addition to collecting preserved specimens for the herbarium, Née gathered live plants which he then grew in his personal gardens. His proficiency as a gardener won him a royal commission in 1784 to create a new botanic garden in Pamplona.

== Malaspina expedition ==
In 1788 Alessandro Malaspina, an officer in the Spanish Navy, petitioned the Spanish government to support a scientific expedition that would visit nearly all the Spanish possessions in the Americas and Asia. King Charles III, a promoter of science in the Spanish Empire, approved the venture which came to be known as the Malaspina Expedition. Malaspina planned to include three naturalists on his scientific team. He first hired Antonio Pineda and Thaddeus Haenke. Pineda was designated the lead naturalist and at his recommendation, Luis Née was proposed to fill the third spot. On February 4, 1789 King Charles IV officially appointed Née as a botanist on the expedition.

The expedition, comprising two ships, set sail from Cadiz on July 30, 1789; Née was aboard the Atrevida, commanded by Jose de Bustamante y Guerra and Pineda was on the second ship, Descubierta, commanded by Malaspina. Haenke missed the start of the voyage and caught up with the ships nine months later. They stopped first in Montevideo on July 30, 1789 and then circled South America with stops in Patagonia, Chile, Peru, Panama, and Nicaragua. At each port Née spent several days or weeks collecting plants in the surrounding region. In addition to collecting plants, Malaspina recalled an incident when Née and Pineda tested a local species of Solanum on themselves resulting in severe vomiting and overall pain and swelling.

When they reached Acapulco on March 27, 1791, Née and Pineda settled down for an extended period of botanizing in Mexico while the expedition proceeded along the coast of North America to Alaska. During the next six months Née collected almost 3,000 plant specimens while travelling over 1,500 miles throughout Mexico. Malaspina returned to Acapulco in December 1791 to pick up Née and Pineda and then head west to Asia.

Six weeks later they reached Marianas Islands where Née collected several rare plants that were later described in his publication, Observaciones Botanicas - Islas Marianas. From there they sailed to the Philippines, reaching Sorsogon Bay in early March 1792. Née was anxious to explore the interior of the island, so he arranged to be left at Sorsogon Bay and travelled alone to Manila where he met up with the expedition three months later. While in the Philippines he collected some 2,400 specimens and kept a journal where he recorded his observations on natural history, agriculture, and native customs. Meanwhile, Pineda was on a separate collecting trip when he became seriously ill and died.

After the Philippines, the two ships visited Australia, New Zealand and Tonga before heading back across the Pacific to South America. From Chile, Née again left the main expedition and journeyed overland across Chile and Argentina to meet up with the team in Montevideo. This was their last port of call; war was threatening in Europe and Malaspina was ordered to prepare his ships for possible battle and return home. They reached Cadiz on September 21, 1794, completing a voyage that lasted more than five years.

== Post-expedition ==
Née remained in Cadiz until December, sorting and arranging the enormous number of plant specimens that had been collected by the expedition. He estimated that he personally had collected more than 12,000 specimens, the largest numbers coming from Mexico (2,900), the Philippines (2,400) and Peru (1,600). Much of this collection was transferred to the Royal Botanical Garden of Madrid where his friend Antonio José Cavanilles served as director. Née's collection ultimately formed the nucleus of the herbarium of the Royal Botanic Gardens.

Despite his intention to identify and describe the entire collection, Née did not publish extensively but he did help Cavanilles with his botanical works and, after receiving a pension in 1801, published regularly in the Anales de Ciencias Naturales. He described several new plant species including Quercus agrifolia (coast live oak) and Quercus lobata (valley oak), both from California. This has sometimes led to the mistaken assumption that Née was in California, but these specimens were gathered by others on the expedition while he was in Mexico.

Most of Née's botanical work ceased after 1804 and he died on October 3, 1807.

Née had two sons from two different marriages. In 1794, botanists José Pavón and Hipólito Ruiz named the genus Neea in his honour. Then in 1976, botanist Cyrus Longworth Lundell published Neeopsis, a monotypic genus of flowering plants from Guatemala, belonging to the family Nyctaginaceae also in his honour.

== See also ==
- European and American voyages of scientific exploration
