= Mulovsky expedition =

The Mulovsky expedition was a Russian naval expedition planned by Catherine II of Russia, to be led by Captain Grigory Ivanovich Mulovsky. The expedition never took place, due to the outbreak of the Russo-Turkish War.

== Initial plans ==
In January 1787, the 22nd year of Catherine II of Russia, two edicts emerged "on the occasion of attempts on the part of English commercial traders to develop trading and commerce in the wildlife of the Eastern Sea", from the Board of Foreign Affairs and the Board of Admiralty. By the first of these, it was ordered that measures be taken "for the maintenance of our right" to the lands discovered by Russians, and by the second, to send four warships from the Baltic Sea by the Cape of Good Hope and Sunda Strait to Kamchatka.

== Captain and crew ==
Captain of the 1st. rank Grigory Ivanovich Mulovsky was appointed commander of this squadron (the number of whose ships was brought up to five) and in his instructions the Admiralty Board set out the problem of the protection of Russian interests in the seas between Kamchatka and America. The expedition was supplied with cast iron escutcheons and specially prepared medals; they were to go with the scientists. It was proposed that the officers keep journals with ethnographical notes and gather collections and compose dictionaries. It was ordered that, after annexing them to Russia, all the Kurile Islands be described, the island of Sakhalin be sailed around and described, that the voyage be continued to Nootka Sound (off Vancouver Island) and that, after investigating that place, the entire coast from "Nootka to the initial point of discovery by Chirikov" be annexed to Russia if it was not already occupied by another power. The expeditions was then to proceed along the coast of Alaska and to "formally to take possession" of it, to destroy foreign armorial bearings and insignia and everywhere establish signs of its belonging to Russia.

James Trevenen, a British Royal Navy officer and companion of Captain James Cook, was connected with the Mulovsky expedition. In the spring of 1787, Catherine II received his project for developing the fur trade in the Pacific Ocean, which included the dispatch of three ships from Kronstadt by Cape Horn: two would remain on the coast of Kamchatka, the third would take on furs obtained to China or Japan; one or two additional ships yearly would ensure communication with the Baltic, which had to become a very good school for Russian seamen, and ensure supplies for the traders. The project was received by the Empress with enthusiasm, and Trevenen was admitted into the Russian fleet as a captain of the 2nd rank.

Another companion of Cook, the naturalist Georg Forster, was invited to participate in the expedition. He was appointed "historiographer of the fleet", according to the program of the expedition actively drawn up by Peter Simon Pallas.

== Cancellation ==
The World, of 23 November 1787, reported that:

The squadron, which the Empress of Russia is about to send to Kamschatka, is now ready, and is victualled for three years. It is commanded by Mr. Mulosky, who received his education in England, and afterwards served as a Midshipman in our Navy.

However the Mulovsky expedition was cancelled by Catherine II on 28 October 1787 in connection with the Russo-Turkish War. The next year the Russo-Swedish War began, during which both Mulovsky and Trevenen perished in separate naval battles against the Swedes.

== Context ==
The conception of the Mulovsky expedition and Trevenen's project anticipated the idea of the 19th century Russian round-the-world and voyages, just as in part it did the scheme of supplying and maintaining commercial communications with Russian America.

== See also ==
- First Russian circumnavigation
