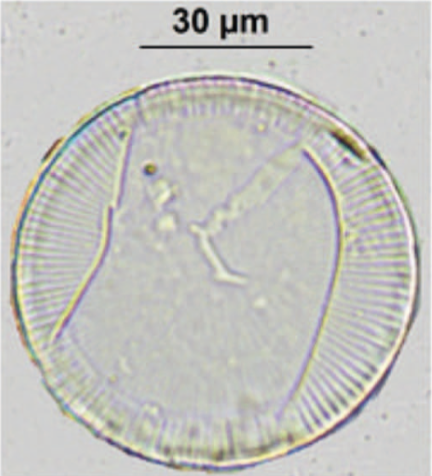
- Ellerbeckia arenaria

Scientific classification
- Domain: Eukaryota
- Clade: Sar
- Clade: Stramenopiles
- Clade: Ochrophyta
- Division: Bacillariophyta
- Class: Melosirophyceae
- Subclass: Melosirophycidae
- Order: incertae sedis
- Genus: Ellerbeckia; R.M.Crawford, 1988

= Ellerbeckia =

Genus of algae

Ellerbeckia is a genus of diatoms.

The species of this genus are found in Europe and Northern America.

Species:

- Ellerbeckia penzhica Lupikina, 1991
