= Hyalodiscus =

Scientific classification
- Domain: Eukaryota
- Clade: Diaphoretickes
- Clade: SAR
- Clade: Stramenopiles
- Phylum: Gyrista
- Subphylum: Ochrophytina
- Class: Bacillariophyceae
- Order: Melosirales
- Family: Hyalodiscaceae
- Genus: Hyalodiscus; Ehrenberg, 1845

Type species
- Hyalodiscus laevis Ehrenberg

Species
- Hyalodiscus cervinus Brightw.; Hyalodiscus elegans N. I. Strelnikova; Hyalodiscus kryshtofovichii A. P. Jousé; Hyalodiscus laevis Ehrenberg; Hyalodiscus planus T. F. Kozyrenko; Hyalodiscus plicatus T. F. Kozyrenko; Hyalodiscus pustulatus Schmidt; Hyalodiscus radiatus (O'Meara) Grunow; Hyalodiscus scoticus (Kützing) Grunow; Hyalodiscus subtilis J. W. Bailey

Genus of single-celled organisms

Hyalodiscus is an extant genus of diatom known also from the fossil record.
