= Skeletonema grethae =

Scientific classification
- Domain: Eukaryota
- Clade: Diaphoretickes
- Clade: SAR
- Clade: Stramenopiles
- Phylum: Gyrista
- Subphylum: Ochrophytina
- Class: Bacillariophyceae
- Order: Thalassiosirales
- Family: Skeletonemataceae
- Genus: Skeletonema
- Species: S. grethae

Binomial name
- Skeletonema grethae Zingone & Sarno, 2005

Species of single-celled organism

Skeletonema grethae is a species of diatom. Together with S. pseudocostatum, S. tropicum, and S. japonicum, it possesses external processes of its fultoportulae that have narrow tips which connect with those of sibling cells via fork-, knot-, or knuckle-like unions.
