= Skeletonema japonicum =

Scientific classification
- Domain: Eukaryota
- Clade: Diaphoretickes
- Clade: SAR
- Clade: Stramenopiles
- Phylum: Gyrista
- Subphylum: Ochrophytina
- Class: Bacillariophyceae
- Order: Thalassiosirales
- Family: Skeletonemataceae
- Genus: Skeletonema
- Species: S. japonicum

Binomial name
- Skeletonema japonicum Zingone & Sarno, 2005

Species of single-celled organism

Skeletonema japonicum is a diatom. Together with S. pseudocostatum, S. tropicum, and S. grethae, it possesses external processes of its fultoportulae that have narrow tips which connect with those of sibling cells via fork-, knot-, or knuckle-like unions.
