= Skeletonema dohrnii =

Scientific classification
- Domain: Eukaryota
- Clade: Diaphoretickes
- Clade: SAR
- Clade: Stramenopiles
- Phylum: Gyrista
- Subphylum: Ochrophytina
- Class: Bacillariophyceae
- Order: Thalassiosirales
- Family: Skeletonemataceae
- Genus: Skeletonema
- Species: S. dohrnii

Binomial name
- Skeletonema dohrnii Sarno & Kooistra, 2005

Species of single-celled organism

Skeletonema dohrnii is a diatom. Together with S. marinoi, this species has flattened extremities of the processes of the fultoportulae, which interlock with those of succeeding valves without forming knuckles. It is a species of the genus Skeletonema that can be found in many waters across the globe. In the coastal waters of South Korea, their cell diameters are about 3 to 6 micrometers.
