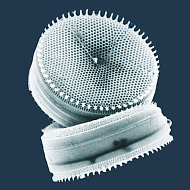

Scientific classification
- Domain: Eukaryota
- Supergroup: Stramenopiles
- Division: Ochrophyta
- Clade: Bacillariophyta
- Class: Thalassiosirophyceae
- Order: Thalassiosirales
- Family: Thalassiosiraceae
- Genus: Conticribra
- Species: C. weissflogii

Binomial name
- Conticribra weissflogii (Grunow) K.Stachura-Suchoples & D.M.Williams

Synonyms
- Eupodiscus weissflogii (Grunow) De Toni; Micropodiscus weissflogii Grunow; Thalassiosira fluviatilis Hustedt; Thalassiosira weissflogii (Grunow) G.Fryxell & Hasle

= Conticribra weissflogii =

Species of single-celled organism

Conticribra weissflogii is a species of centric diatoms, a unicellular microalga. It is found in marine environments and also in inland waters in many parts of the world. It is actively studied because it may use C4-plant style strategies to increase its photosynthetic efficiency.

== Taxonomy ==
rDNA evidence suggests that Conticribra weissflogii is a species complex and that several different genetic populations exist. There was found to be a divergence between one clade from the east and west Atlantic Ocean and California and another from Hawaii and Indonesia. The latter was considered to consist of two different biological species, one from Hawaii and one from the Indonesian archipelago.

== Description ==
Conticribra weissflogii is a short cylinder in shape and varies in size from 4 to 32 μm in diameter. It tends to be larger in winter, typically 15 μm in diameter, but smaller in summer (5 μm). It occurs both singly and in groups and may be embedded in a gelatinous matrix. There is a silicaceous cell wall with two frustules or valves, a larger epivalve and a smaller hypovalve. The face of the valves vary in shape but are basically irregular rings with one labiate and two or more central processes. Other features that may be present include an irregularly shaped areola or pore, further processes on the rim of the valves, marginal spines, striations and thick radial ribs.

== Distribution and habitat ==
The native range of Conticribra weissflogii is unclear, but it is found in marine, brackish and freshwater environments. It seems to grow best at higher salinities and occurs in coastal waters in the Atlantic and Pacific Oceans and in rivers and lakes in Europe, Asia, South and North America, including the Great Lakes, where it was thought to have been introduced in ballast water.

== Ecology ==
Conticribra weissflogii is non-toxic but it is sometimes associated with other microalgae that cause algal blooms or red tides.

It is very tolerant to poor water quality. It flourishes in environments with high carbon dioxide levels, high chlorine, high cadmium and high pH. Its growth may be limited by the availability of iron, nickel, zinc, nitrogen and silicon. Cadmium is actually a nutrient for the diatom, and not just a toxin. If zinc is deficient in the environment, the diatom switches to a different version of carbonic anhydrase enzyme, which uses cadmium instead of zinc as a cofactor.

== Biology ==
Reproduction in Conticribra weissflogii can be by either asexual or sexual means. The asexual phase involves cell division with each of the new individuals receiving one of the valves. This means that the offspring are of unequal sizes and successive generations tend to decrease in size. Large individuals can also reproduce sexually. This event may be triggered by some external factor such as a variation in light intensity, temperature or day length.

== Uses ==
In aquaculture, Conticribra weissflogii is used to feed to shrimp and shellfish larvae in hatcheries. It is considered preferable for this purpose to the other commercially available microalgae, Chaetoceros and Tetraselmis, because of its larger size which means it can continue to be used at more advanced larval stages. It is available as a culture of "Instant Algae" which can be stored at 0-4 °C.
