= Mediolabrus comicus =

Scientific classification
- Domain: Eukaryota
- Clade: Sar
- Clade: Stramenopiles
- Division: Ochrophyta
- Clade: Bacillariophyta
- Class: Thalassiosirophyceae
- Order: Thalassiosirales
- Family: Thalassiosiraceae
- Genus: Mediolabrus
- Species: M. comicus

Binomial name
- Mediolabrus comicus (H.Takano) Yang Li

Synonyms
- Minidiscus comicus

Species of single-celled algae

Mediolabrus comicus, known previously as Minidiscus comicus, is a species of nanophytoplanktonic centric diatoms within the family Thalassiosiraceae. Its cells have diameters as small as 1.9 μm, which makes M. comicus one of the smallest known diatoms and brings it near to the theoretical lower size limit for photosynthetic eukaryotes.

== Taxonomy ==
Mediolabrus comicus was originally described as Minidiscus comicus, but in 2020, it was transferred based on molecular phylogenetics to a newly erected genus Mediolabrus, as its type species.

== Morphology and ultrastructure ==
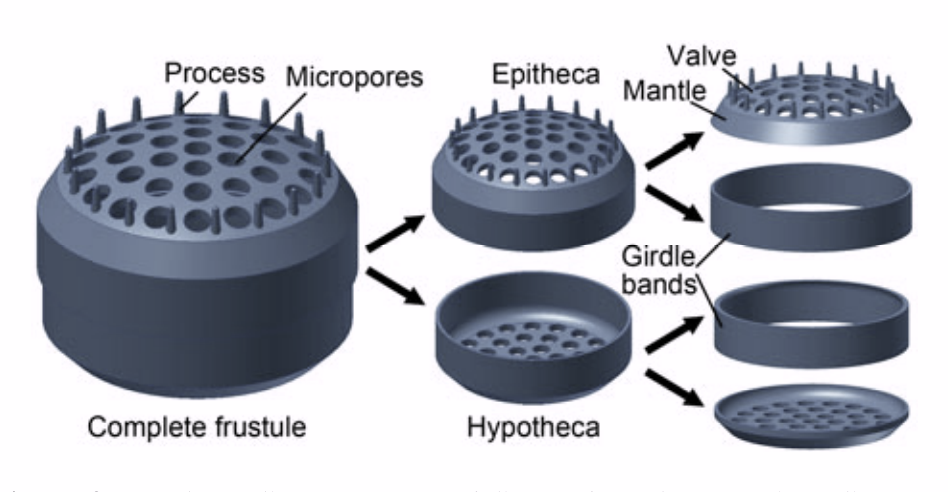
General structure of a centric diatom shell, the frustule

Cells of M. comicus have diameters between 1.9 and 6.0 μm. The larger cells are discoidal with flat valve faces (ends of the siliceous shell), while the smaller ones are spherical or even oblong. Valve margins are very narrow and marginal areolae (small regularly repeated pores) terminate close to the valve edge. There are 6–8 areolae per 1 μm. Each valve face has one central rimoportula (lip-like pore) surrounded by two to four fultoportulae (tube-like pores). Only a single rimoportula near the valve center is a diagnostic feature of the genus Mediolabrus. External fultoportula tubes are well developed as fluted cylinders, rising to over 0.5 μm in height above the mantle (side of the valve). The central rimoportula tube can reach up to 2.4 μm in height in large cells. The copulae that protect dividing cells are very thin and not discernible in non-dividing cells. The fultoportulae extrude long threads (presumably of chitin) that connect cells within the small colonies.

=== Life cycle and adaptations to small size ===
M. comicus, like other diatoms, undergoes a multi-year life cycle during which its cells get increasingly smaller in diameter with each asexual division, until they reach a point of size restoration, presumably connected to a sexual process. David Jewson and colleagues studied samples of M. comicus collected in the western Mediterranean by RV Sarmiento de Gamboa between March and September 2009. This allowed them to explore the diversity of shapes and sizes of cells during different phases of algal bloom development, as well as the life cycle of the algae.

They found a strong relationship between cell diameter and shape. The largest cells, with diameters above 4 μm, are cylindrical with flat or slightly domed valves. As the cell diameter declines with each consecutive division, doming of the valve faces becomes more pronounced, until they become spherical at around 3 μm (this is also the size at which size restoration starts occurring) and some cells even become oblong at around 2 μm. This allows M. comicus to keep its cell volume relatiovely stable, even though the diameter changes dramatically.

== Ecology and distribution ==
Mediolabrus comicus was first described from a red tide in Tokyo harbour on September 17, 1980, forming large aggregated flocks. Since then it has usually been found as solitary cells or forming short chains of 2 or 3 cells. It is widespread along the Pacific and Atlantic coasts and in the Adriatic and Mediterranean seas, suggesting a cosmopolitan distribution.

=== Role in algal blooms and carbon cycle ===
In 2013, scientists aboard the research vessel Téthys II studied a large annual spring phytoplankton bloom in the Gulf of Lions (northwestern Mediterranean Sea) and found that contrary to expectations, it was dominated by two species of nanophytoplanktonic diatoms: M. comicus and Minidiscus trioculatus. Such intense blooms were thought to be caused by larger chain-forming diatom genera and the tiny Minidiscus and Mediolabrus have never been documented as their dominant constituents in the Mediterranean before. The same study also found out that these smallest diatoms can reach the seafloor at high sinking rates, potentially contributing to carbon export much more substantially than previously expected.

== See also ==
- Smallest organisms
