= Thalassiosira symmetrica =

Scientific classification
- Domain: Eukaryota
- Clade: Diaphoretickes
- Clade: Sar
- Clade: Stramenopiles
- Phylum: Gyrista
- Subphylum: Ochrophytina
- Class: Bacillariophyceae
- Order: Thalassiosirales
- Family: Thalassiosiraceae
- Genus: Thalassiosira
- Species: T. symmetrica

Binomial name
- Thalassiosira symmetrica G.A.Fryxell & Hasle

Species of single-celled organism

Thalassiosira symmetrica is a species of marine centric diatoms. It differs with T. eccentrica in the value processes and distribution patterns. The latter species is more abundant in inshore waters, while T. symmetrica has been found in oceanic waters.
