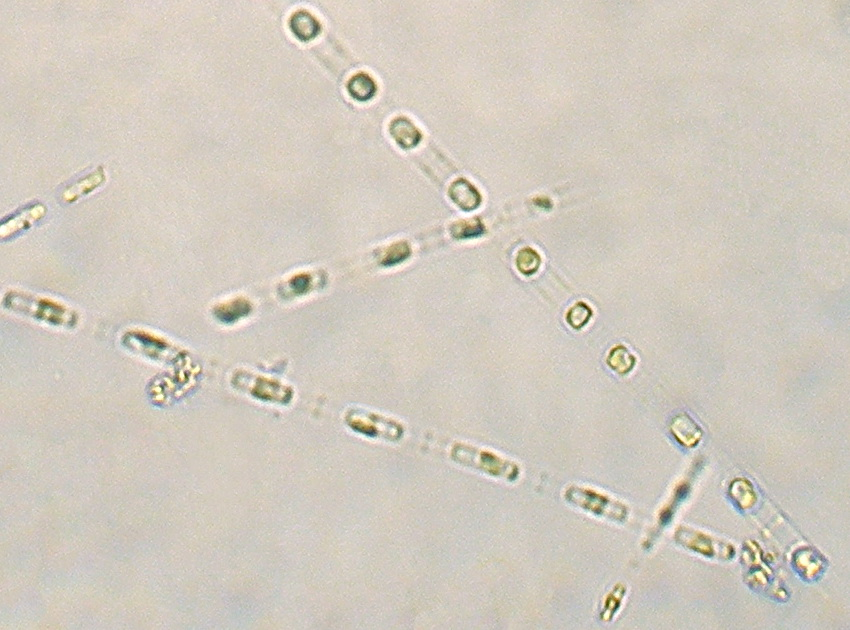
- Skeletonema costatum

Scientific classification
- Domain: Eukaryota
- Clade: Sar
- Clade: Stramenopiles
- Division: Ochrophyta
- Clade: Bacillariophyta
- Class: Thalassiosirophyceae
- Order: Thalassiosirales
- Family: Thalassiosiraceae
- Genus: Skeletonema; R. K. Greville, 1865

Species
- Skeletonema ardens Sarno & Zingone, 2007; Skeletonema costatum (Greville) Cleve, 1873; Skeletonema dohrnii Sarno & Kooistra, 2005; Skeletonema grethae Zingone & Sarno, 2005; Skeletonema grevillei Sarno & Zingone, 2005; Skeletonema japonicum Zingone & Sarno, 2005; Skeletonema marinoi Sarno & Zingone, 2005; Skeletonema menzelii Guillard, Carpenter & Reimann, 1974; Skeletonema mirabile Grunow ex Van Heurck, 1882; Skeletonema munzelii Guillard, Carpeuter & Reimann, 1974; Skeletonema potamos (C. I. Weber) Hasle, 1976; Skeletonema probabile A. P. Jousé; Skeletonema pseudocostatum L. K. Medlin, 1991; Skeletonema stylifera Brun; Skeletonema subsalsum (Cleve-Euler) Bethge, 1928; Skeletonema tropicum Cleve, 1900

= Skeletonema =

Genus of single-celled organisms

Skeletonema is a genus of centric diatoms in the family Skeletonemataceae. It is the type genus of its family.

== Background ==
Diatoms are photosynthetic organisms, meaning they obtain carbon dioxide from their surrounding environment and produce oxygen along with other byproducts. They reproduce sexually (sexual reproduction is oogamous) and asexually. Skeletonema belong to the morphological category referred to as centric diatoms. These are classified by having valves with radial symmetry and the cells lack significant motility.

== Taxonomy ==
The genus Skeletonema was established by Robert Kaye Greville in 1865 for a single fossil species, S. barbadense (now Skeletonemopsis barbadense), found in Barbados deposits. The genus has a new extant type species: S. costatum.

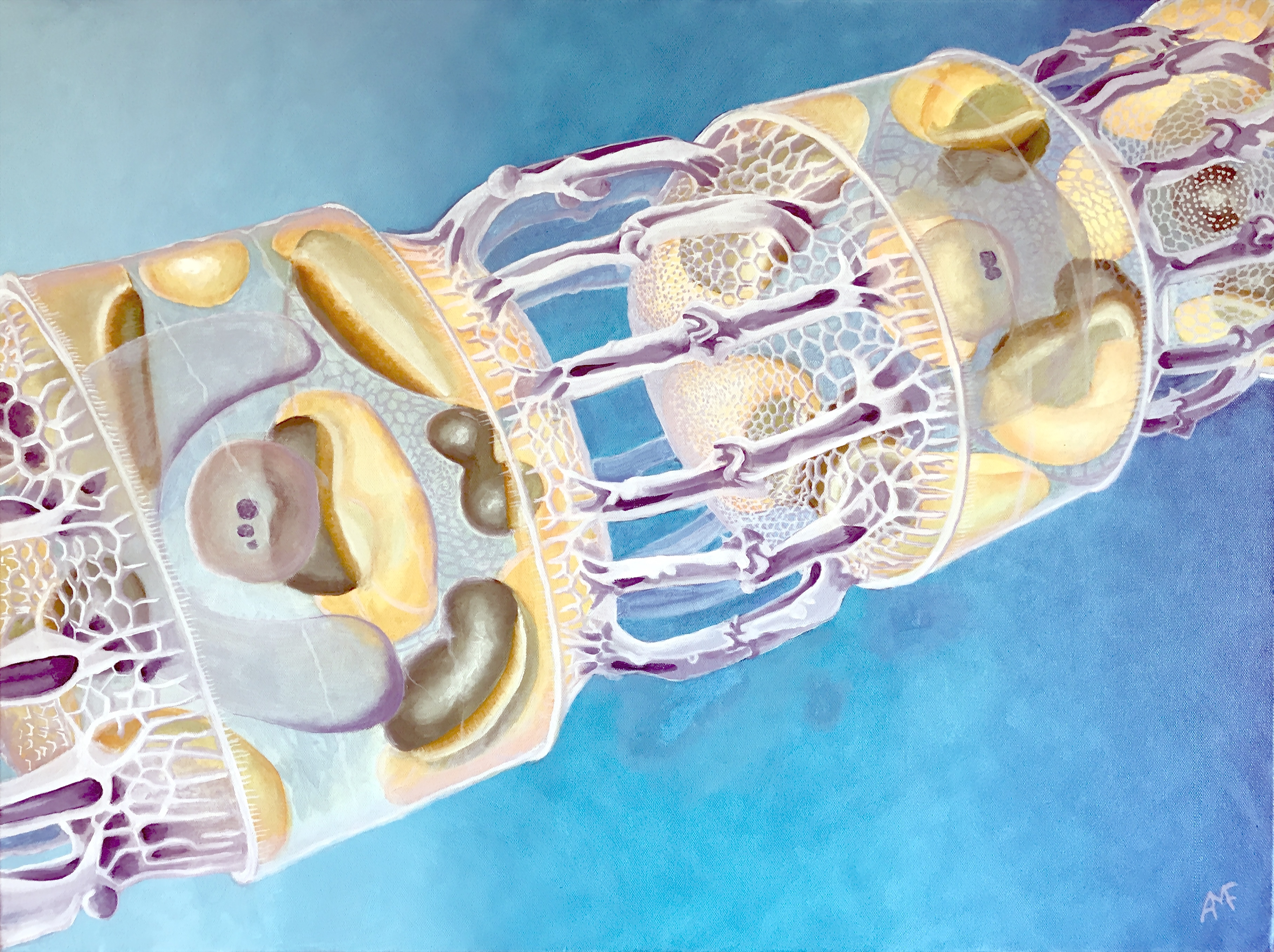
Painting of a chain of Skeletonema costatum, a centric diatom from the temperate waters of the Atlantic. Oil on canvas. By Arnaud Muller-Feuga

== Morphology and ultrastructure ==
Skeletonema are cylindrical shaped with a silica frustule. Cells are joined by long marginal processes to form a filament. Their length ranges from 2-61 micrometers, with a diameter ranging from 2-21 micrometers.

== Ecology and distribution ==
They are found typically in the neritic zone of the ocean and are highly populous in coastal systems. The genus is considered cosmopolitan, showing a wide range of tolerance for salinity and temperature. For example, they have been found in various aquatic environments such as brackish or freshwater. Skeletonema are found worldwide excluding Antarctic waters. Some species are found in both the northern and southern temperate latitudes whereas other species appear to have only subtropical to tropical ranges.

Some harmful effects these diatoms may have on an ecosystem are attributed to large blooming events which may cause hypoxic events in coastal systems. Additionally, they are known to cause water discoloration.
