= Polyunsaturated aldehyde =

Class of compounds produced by diatoms to hinder predators

Polyunsaturated aldehydes (PUAs) are a group of allelopathic chemicals typically associated with predator–prey interactions between diatoms (a type of single-celled alga) and small crustaceans known as copepods. These compounds are classified by an aldehyde group covalently bound to long carbon chains containing two or more carbon–carbon double bonds. Examples include isomers of heptadienal, octadienal, octatrienal, and decatrienal.

== Production by diatoms ==
Polyunsaturated aldehydes are oxylipins that are formed from lipids (specifically the fatty acid portion of lipids) when diatoms are exposed to environmental stresses. Stresses can include nutrient limitations, grazing by predators, and wounding.

In particular, damage to diatom cells as a result of grazing by zooplankton invokes a chemical defense mechanism that produces PUA's as secondary metabolites from fatty acids. The production mechanism is as follows:

1. Grazing by predators results in diatom cell membrane disruption.
2. Enzymes (lipases) are produced in response to the damaged membranes. These enzymes make contact with newly freed phospholipids (from cell membranes) and catalyze the formation of polyunsaturated fatty acids.
3. The enzyme lipoxygenase then catalyzes the reaction of fatty acids to polyunsaturated aldehydes, which are then directly exposed to the grazing zooplankton.

Thalassiosira rotula represents the most well-studied diatom species in terms of polyunsaturated aldehyde production. Wichard et al. determined that only 30% of PUA precursor molecules remain in T. rotula within minutes of cell membrane wounding, indicating a fast rate of response by diatoms to zooplankton grazing.

== PUA-producing diatoms ==
T. rotula has been known to produce many types of polyunsaturated aldehydes, including (2E,4E/Z)-hepta-2,4-dienal, (2E,4E/Z,7Z)-deca-2,4,7-trienal, (2E,4E/Z)-octa-2,4-dienal, and (2E,4E/Z,7Z)-octa-2,4,7-trienal. These particular aldehydes are also produced by Stephanopyxis turris and Skeletonema costatum in response to wounding. Phaeocystis pouchetii and Skeletonema marinoi also produce various octadienal and heptadienal isomers.

== Effects on zooplankton ==
Copepods are known to be the primary consumers of diatoms in the water column and initiate the production of PUA upon grazing. The consumption of PUA-producing diatoms by copepods has been shown to diminish their reproductive success. Specifically, female copepods that consume diatoms spawn eggs with low viabilities and offspring with high teratogenesis rates. The compounds mainly act by preventing cell division and promoting apoptosis in copepod embryos, though the mechanism behind this is still poorly understood.
