= Netawansum =

Netawansum is a mythological figure in Mi'kmaq tradition, known as the nephew or niece and travel companion of Klu'skap. Netawansum was created by Kisúlk using ocean foam that had been blown onto sweetgrass along the shore. Netawansum possessed knowledge about the life and strength of the maritime world.

During the sixth stage of creation, Netawansum met their uncle Kluskap and granted him improved vision, including the ability to see great distances, perceive spirits, and strengthen his body. To celebrate their meeting, Netawansum brought gifts from the ocean to Kluskap. In return, Kluskap summoned fish from the ocean, cooked them, and prepared a meal alongside nuts from the trees. Together with Klu'skap and Klu'skap's grandmother Nukumi, they found Klu'skap's mother, Níkanaptekewísqw. The group of four lived together for a long time before Kluskap decided to leave his mother and nephew/niece to travel north with his grandmother.

A Mi'kmaq ceremony held during council gatherings involves burning sweetgrass to honor the arrival of Netawansum.
