= Fatty aldehyde =

Chemical structure of the fatty aldehyde dodecanal

Fatty aldehydes are aliphatic, long-chain aldehydes which may be mono- or polyunsaturated. The fatty aldehydes include compounds such as octanal, nonanal, decanal or dodecanal. The nomenclature is derived from the nomenclature of the alkanes, the ending -al is added to indicate the aldehyde group.

== Occurrence ==
Fatty aldehydes are a natural component of many natural ingredients such as the essential oils of various citrus fruits. Decanal, for example, is a component of orange peel. The pheromone cocktails of various insect pheromones contain fatty aldehydes. Fat aldehydes were also detected in the heart muscle of mammals.

== Preparation ==
Fatty aldehydes can be prepared by dehydrogenation of fatty alcohols on copper-zinc catalysts. By the hydroformylation of alkenes, fatty aldehydes are produced on a large industrial scale.

== Use ==
A large proportion of the fatty aldehydes prepared by hydroformylation is directly processed further to fatty alcohols. Many fatty aldehydes find use as a fragrance in perfume production. An example is 2-methylundecanal which is the typical odor component of Chanel No. 5. Decanal, whose sweet, flowery odor reminiscents of orange peels, is used, among other things, as a flavoring agent in the food industry and as a perfume in the perfume industry.

== See also ==
- Fatty acid
- Fatty alcohol
