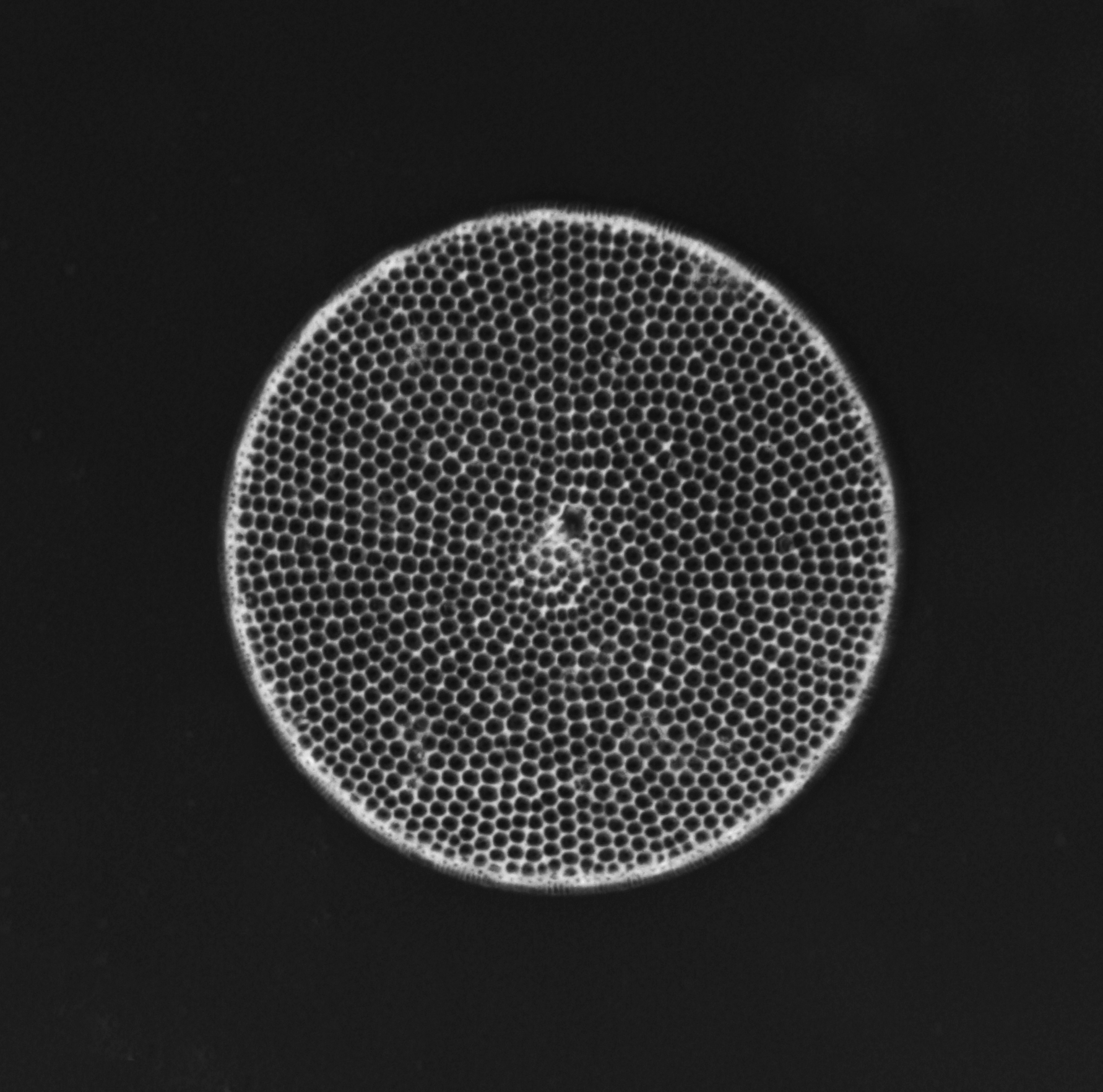
- Fossil species of Thalassiosira

Scientific classification
- Domain: Eukaryota
- Clade: Sar
- Clade: Stramenopiles
- Division: Ochrophyta
- Clade: Bacillariophyta
- Class: Thalassiosirophyceae
- Order: Thalassiosirales
- Family: Thalassiosiraceae
- Genus: Thalassiosira; P.T. Cleve, 1873 emend. Hasle, 1973

Species
- See text

= Thalassiosira =

Thalassiosira Temporal range: 11.608–0.0 Ma

Genus of single-celled organisms

Thalassiosira is a genus of centric diatoms, comprising over 100 marine and freshwater species. It is a diverse group of photosynthetic eukaryotes that make up a vital part of marine and freshwater ecosystems, in which they are key primary producers and essential for carbon cycling.

Thalassiosira is a diverse genus, however one species within the genus, T. pseudonana, has gained particular significance as the first marine phytoplankton to have its genome sequenced. T. pseudonana has since become a key model organism for studying diatom physiology. The T. pseudonana genome revealed novel genes for intracellular trafficking and metabolism in diatoms. This species was again used to develop methods for genetic manipulation of diatoms and for the study of silica biomineralization.

== Background ==
Thalassiosira was first described in 1873 by P.T. Cleve. The genus name of Thalassiosira is named after Thalassa the Greek word for the 'sea' and for its divine female personification in Greek mythology Cleve noted "The Thalassiosira ... occurs in enormous large masses, floating on the surface of the sea and colouring it for many miles in extent".

The genus was then characterized with transmission electron microscopy in the 1950s and scanning electron microscopy in the 1960s, which led to an enhanced understanding of the defining morphological features of the genus and the subsequent recognition of over 100 species

A species of Thalassiosira, T. pseudonana, was selected as the first marine eukaryotic phytoplankton to undergo whole genome sequencing, due to its small 34Mb genome. As a result, T. pseudonana has served as a model organism for understanding diatom biology. Whole genome sequencing, transcriptomics and proteomics of T. pseudonana have revealed novel pathways for silicon biogenesis, phosphorus stress response, intracellular transport and metabolism in marine diatoms. Recent genetic studies using ribosomal RNA gene sequences better distinguish and classify Thalassiosira species and metabolomics defines the organic compounds produced by Thalassiosira.

== Description ==
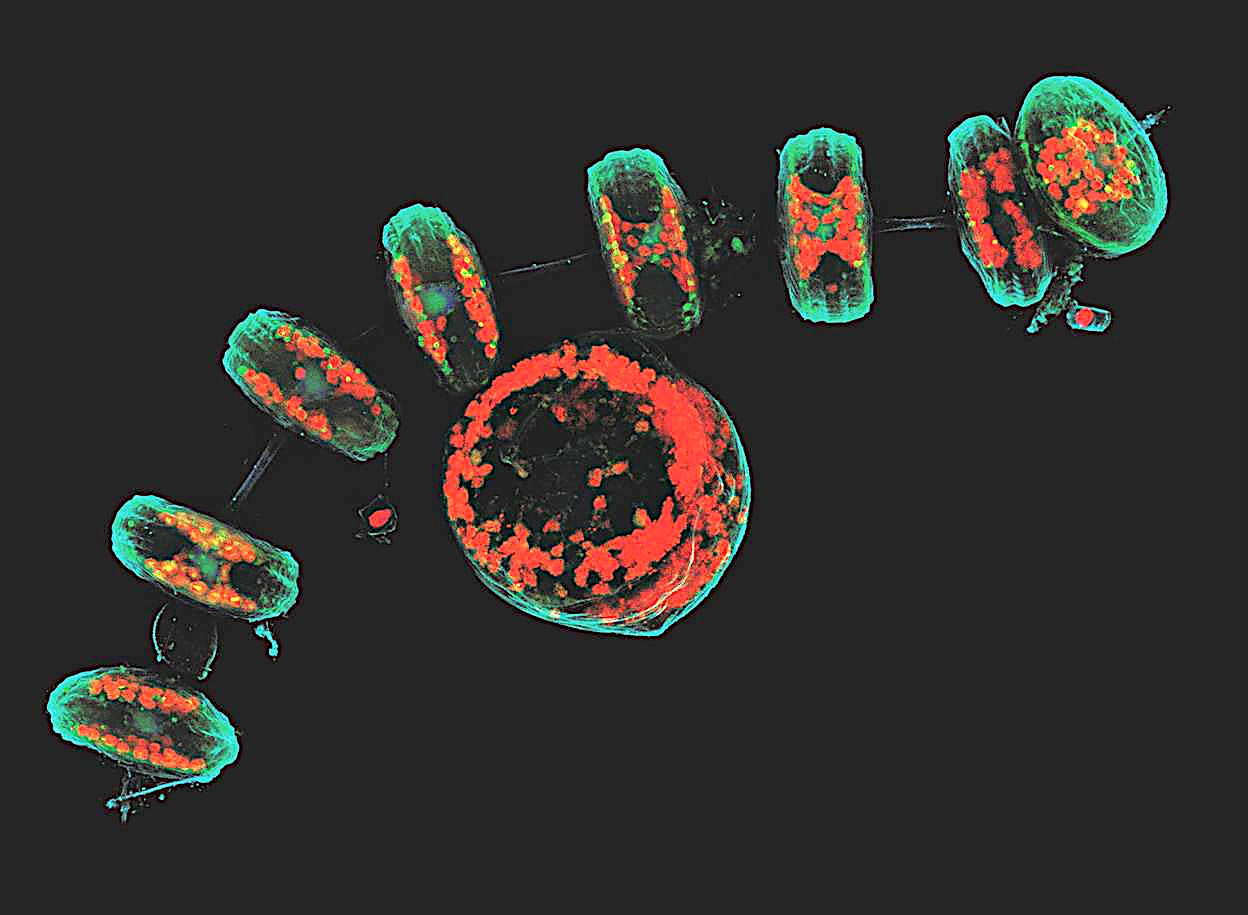
Some Thalassiosira diatoms form chain-like colonies, like these ones collected near the Antarctic peninsula coast by the schooner of the Tara Oceans Expedition for plankton research. This confocal image shows the diatoms' cell wall (cyan), chloroplasts (red), DNA (blue), membranes and organelles (green).

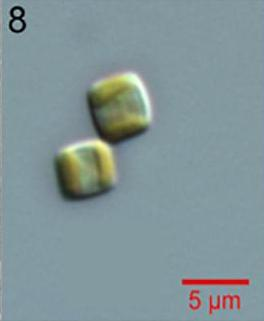
Microscopy image of Thalassiosira sp., scale bar 5 μm.

Thalassiosira come in a variety of shapes, from box-shaped to cylindrical, discoid or spherical. Some Thalassiosira cells are found alone while others form chains. Thalassiosira have a cell wall made of silica, known as a frustule. Thalasiosira harbor several discoid plastids and a circular valve, which contains pores arranged in rows or arcs, opening outwards. The valve’s mantle edge is pattered with a series of bands. Different species of Thalassiosira can be identified by the morphological characteristics of their areolae and the processes on the valve. During colony formation, Thalassiosira release chitin filaments through strutted processes known as fultoportulae. By extruding chitin fibers, and thereby increasing drag, Thalassiosira can slow the rate at which they sink.

== Habitat and ecology ==
Thalassiosira occupy diverse habitats, both marine and freshwater. Of note, they are a vital primary producers in temperate and polar regions. Thalassiosira can thrive in low temperature and light, as well as mixed waters, and are therefore a large part of diatom blooms during spring in temperate regions, such as Canadian and Alaskan waters. Species in this genus are also capable of assembling defensive threads against zooplankton, allowing them to survive the predation that normally keeps phytoplankton blooms in check.

Thalassiosira species are diverse in both their ecology and physiologies, with variable mechanisms for nitrogen storage or requirements for iron. Iron concentrations, temperature and macronutrient availability have been identified as important factors for the composition of Thalassiosira species communities in marine waters.

== Genetics ==
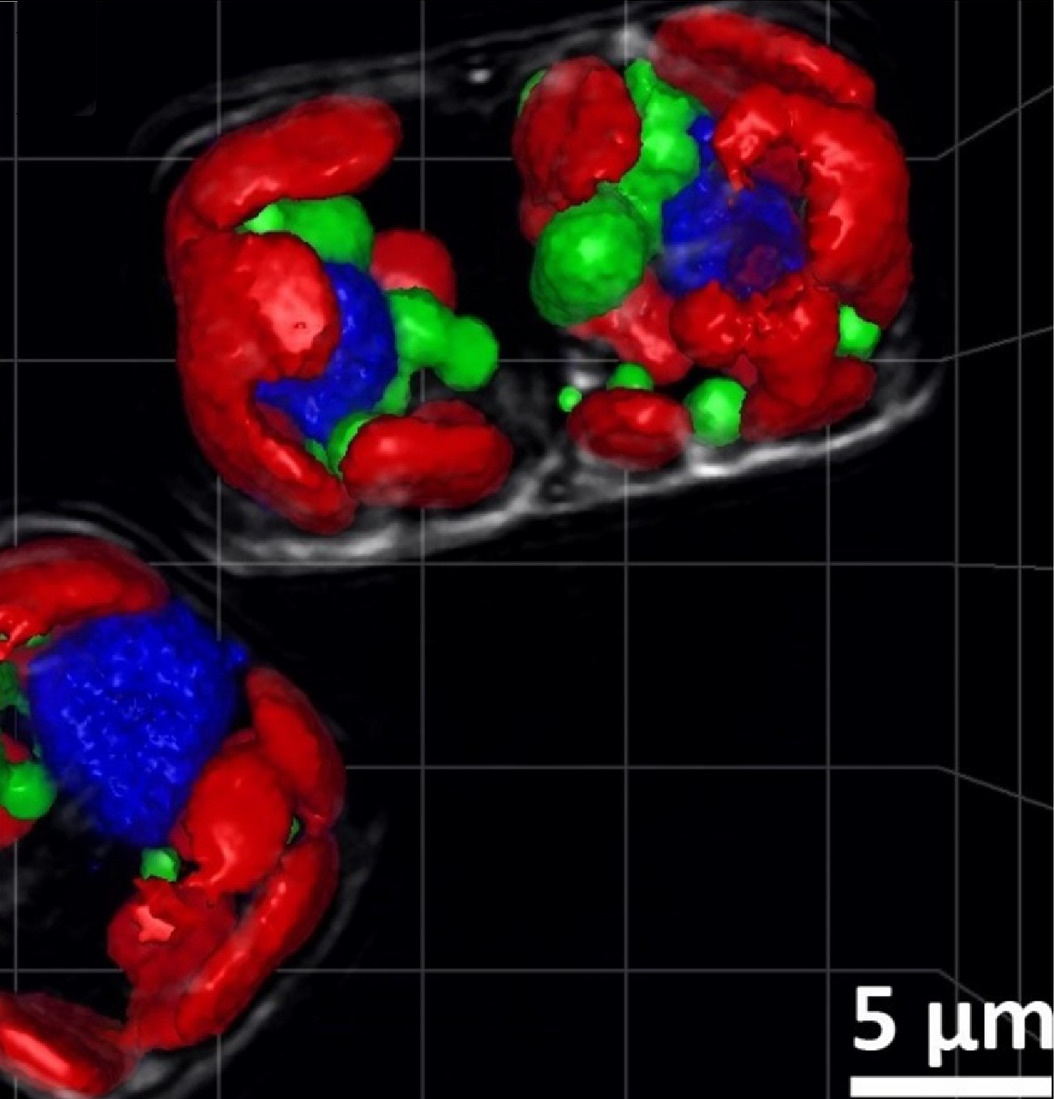
Fluorescence micrograph of the diatom Thalassiosira nanae. Chloroplasts are red, neutral lipids green, DNA blue and the cell wall white. Fluorescence microscopy provides three-dimensional information of individual components, enabling the measurement of their volumes.

Phylogenetic studies based on 18S rRNA genes have revealed several clades within Thalassiosira, an overall paraphyletic group within the family Thalassiosirales. The relationships of species within the clades remain to be elucidated.

The sequence of the T. pseudonana genome revealed a host of features which set apart diatoms from other eukaryotes. For instance, heat shock transcription factors make up the majority of transcription factors in the T. pseudonana genome, though they are less common in other eukaryotes. Also setting it apart from other eukaryotic genomes is the relative absence of receptor kinases and G protein-coupled receptors. More specific to diatom biology, the understanding of silicon biochemistry in diatoms was enhanced by the discovery of genes involved in the uptake of silicic acid and proteins involved in vesicles for silica precipitation.

A surprising finding from the T. pseudonana genome was the presence of genes encoding enzymes for a complete urea cycle, which was unprecedented in a photosynthetic eukaryote. Diatoms are known to utilize a urease enzyme to catalyze the breakdown of urea and were therefore not expected to need mechanisms to excrete it as waste. Curiously, the T. pseudonana urea cycle feeds into other metabolic pathways, which contribute to protein biosynthesis and possibly energy storage.

== Life cycle ==
Thalassiosira can undergo both asexual and sexual reproduction in processes shared by other diatoms. During asexual reproduction, the parent cell divides into two daughter cells of unequal size — one equal in size to the parent and one smaller. This constraint on size during mitotic division is due to the presence of the rigid silica cell wall. As a result, over multiple cell divisions, the cells size of each daughter cell will decrease. To cope with diminishing cell size, Thalassiosira can transition to sexual reproduction, which is triggered by an assortment of environmental factors, which are not well understood, once cells reach a critically small size. In sexual reproduction, sperm and egg, which can arise from the same cell, fuse to form a diploid zygote, which is referred to as an auxospore. This progeny can then emerge from the parental frustule (silica wall) and reconstruct its own cell wall, thus becoming a cell of a larger size.

== Fossil history ==
The geological record of Thalassiosira dates back to 13.82 million years ago. The fossil record of both freshwater and marine Thalassiosira organisms is substantial, though the freshwater collection has been characterized more extensively.

== Practical importance ==
T. pseudonana has been particularly useful for molecular studies due to its small genome size. It has revealed novel pathways for silica biosynthesis, which involve uptake of monosilicic acid from the marine environment, intracellular transport to a specialized vesicle, and specialized enzymes and peptides driving silica synthesis.

Silica biosynthesis, for which the species T. pseudonana has come to serve as a model organism for study, has been of particular interest in the context of engineering silica nanotechnology. For instance, a modified T. pseudonana has been explored as a drug-delivery vesicle in cancer treatment.

Thalassiosira, among other diatoms, have also been considered as potentially useful sources of lipids for biofuels. Specifically, T. weissflogii has been shown to reduce its silica synthesis while upregulating the production of triacylglycerols when cultured in nitrogen-limiting conditions.

== List of species ==
- Thalassiosira aculeata Proshkina-Lavrenko
- Thalassiosira aestivalis Gran
- Thalassiosira allenii H.Takano
- Thalassiosira ambigua O.G.Kozlova
- Thalassiosira andamanica A.D.Gedde
- Thalassiosira angulata (W.Gregory) Hasle
- Thalassiosira angustelineata (A.W.F.Schmidt) G.Fryxell & Hasle
- Thalassiosira antarctica Comber
- Thalassiosira australiensis (Grunow) G.R.Hasle
- Thalassiosira australis M.Peragallo
- Thalassiosira azovica Gogorev & Kovaleva
- Thalassiosira baldaufii P.Bodén
- Thalassiosira baltica (Grunow) Ostenfeld
- Thalassiosira binata Fryxell
- Thalassiosira bipora M.Shiono
- Thalassiosira bradburyi Khursevich & Kociolek
- Thalassiosira bramaputrae (Ehrenberg) Håkansson & Locker
- Thalassiosira brunii F.Akiba & Y.Yanagisawa
- Thalassiosira bulbosa E.E.Syvertsen
- Thalassiosira burckliana H.J.Schrader
- Thalassiosira californica Y.Tanimura
- Thalassiosira caspica I.V.Makarova
- Thalassiosira castanea F.Akiba & Y.Yanagisawa
- Thalassiosira catharinensis García
- Thalassiosira cedarkeyensis A.K.S.K.Prasad
- Thalassiosira centra M.Shiono
- Thalassiosira complicata R.Gersonde
- Thalassiosira concava H.J.Semina
- Thalassiosira condensata Cleve
- Thalassiosira conferta Hasle
- Thalassiosira convexa V.V.Muchina
- Thalassiosira coronifera Proshkina-Lavrenko
- Thalassiosira cryophila Kisselev
- Thalassiosira cuitzeonensis I.Israde, K.Serieyssol & F.Gasse
- Thalassiosira curviseriata Takano
- Thalassiosira decipiens (Grunow ex Van Heurck) E.G.Jørgensen
- Thalassiosira delicatula Ostenfeld
- Thalassiosira densannula Hasle & Fryxell
- Thalassiosira depressa M.Shiono
- Thalassiosira depressa Shiono
- Thalassiosira dichotomica (O.G.Kozlova) G.A.Fryxell & G.R.Hasle
- Thalassiosira diporocyclus Hasle
- Thalassiosira dolmatovae Oreshkina ex A.Gladenkov
- Thalassiosira dubia Leuduger-Fortmorel
- Thalassiosira dubiosa H.J.Schrader
- Thalassiosira duosa C.Pienaar
- Thalassiosira eccentrica (Ehrenberg) Cleve
- Thalassiosira echinata H.J.Semina
- Thalassiosira elliptipora J.Fenner ex A.D.Mahood & J.A.Barron
- Thalassiosira elsayedii Fryxell
- Thalassiosira exceptiuncula M.Shiono
- Thalassiosira exceptiuncula Shiono
- Thalassiosira exigua G.Fryxell & Hasle
- Thalassiosira fasciculata D.M.Harwood & T.Maruyama
- Thalassiosira faurii (Gasse) Hasle
- Thalassiosira feibelii Brindle & J.Mohan
- Thalassiosira ferelineata Hasle & G.A.Fryxell
- Thalassiosira flexuosa (J.Brun) F.Akiba & Y.Yanagisawa
- Thalassiosira fraga H.J.Schrader
- Thalassiosira fragilis G.Fryxell
- Thalassiosira frenguelliopsis G.A.Fryxell & J.R.Johans
- Thalassiosira fryxelliae Sunesen & Sar
- Thalassiosira gasseae Brindle & J.Mohan
- Thalassiosira gerloffii Rivera Ramirez
- Thalassiosira gersondei J.A.Barron
- Thalassiosira gessneri Hustedt
- Thalassiosira gracilis (Karsten) Hustedt
- Thalassiosira gravida Cleve
- Thalassiosira grunowii F.Akiba & Y.Yanagisawa
- Thalassiosira hasleae Cassie & Dempsey
- Thalassiosira hendeyi Hasle & G.Fryxell
- Thalassiosira hibernalis A.M.Gayoso
- Thalassiosira hispida Syvertsen
- Thalassiosira hyalina (Grunow) Gran
- Thalassiosira hydra A.M.Gombos
- Thalassiosira hyperborea (Grunow) Hasle
- Thalassiosira ignota Makarova
- Thalassiosira incerta I.V.Makarova
- Thalassiosira insigna (A.P.Jousé) D.M.Harwood & T.Maruyama
- Thalassiosira intrannula Herzig & Fryxell
- Thalassiosira inura R.Gersonde
- Thalassiosira iraidae Khursevich & Kociolek
- Thalassiosira irregulata H.J.Schrader
- Thalassiosira jouseae F.Akiba
- Thalassiosira kanayae Y.Tanimura
- Thalassiosira khursevichiae D.Bennett, Laslandes, & Kociolek
- Thalassiosira kushirensis H.Takano
- Thalassiosira labimarginata P.Bodén
- Thalassiosira laevis Y.H.Gao & Z.D.Cheng
- Thalassiosira latimarginata Makarova
- Thalassiosira lentiginosa (Janisch) Fryxell
- Thalassiosira leptopus (Grunow) Hasle & G.Fryxell
- Thalassiosira levanderi Van Goor
- Thalassiosira licea G.Fryxell
- Thalassiosira lineata Jousé
- Thalassiosira lineoides Herzig & Fryxell
- Thalassiosira livingstoniorum A.K.S.K.Prasad, P.Hargraves & J.A.Nienow
- Thalassiosira lundiana Fryxell
- Thalassiosira lusca H.J.Schrader
- Thalassiosira maculata G.A.Fryxell & J.R.Johansen
- Thalassiosira mahoodii J.A.Barron
- Thalassiosira makarovae V.V.Mukhina
- Thalassiosira mala Takano
- Thalassiosira manifesta Sheshukova-Poretskaya
- Thalassiosira mediaconvexa H.J.Schrader
- Thalassiosira mediterranea (Schröder) Hasle
- Thalassiosira mendiolana Hasle & Heimdal
- Thalassiosira minicosmica Lee & Park
- Thalassiosira minima Gaarder
- Thalassiosira minuscula Krasske
- Thalassiosira miocenica H.J.Schrader
- Thalassiosira mioplicata F.Akiba & Y.Yanagisawa
- Thalassiosira multipora M.C.Whiting & H.Schrader
- Thalassiosira nana Lohmann
- Thalassiosira nanolineata (A.Mann) Fryxell & Hasle
- Thalassiosira nativa Sheshukova-Poretzkaya
- Thalassiosira nodulolineata (Hendey) Hasle & Fryxell
- Thalassiosira nordenskioeldii Cleve
- Thalassiosira oceanica Hasle
- Thalassiosira oliveriana (O'Meara) I.V.Makarova & V.A.Nikolajev
- Thalassiosira oranica G.R.Hasle
- Thalassiosira ordinaria I.V.Makarova
- Thalassiosira ornata Proshkina-Lavrenko
- Thalassiosira pacifica Gran & Angst
- Thalassiosira partheneia Schrader
- Thalassiosira parva Proshkina-Lavrenko
- Thalassiosira parvula Makarova
- Thalassiosira perispinosa Y.Tanimura
- Thalassiosira plicata H.J.Schrader
- Thalassiosira poroirregulata Hasle & Heimdal
- Thalassiosira praeconvexa Burckle
- Thalassiosira praefraga Gladenkov & Barron
- Thalassiosira praegracilis Gogorev & Pushina
- Thalassiosira praenidulus F.Akiba
- Thalassiosira primalabiata A.M.Gombos
- Thalassiosira profunda (Hendey) Hasle
- Thalassiosira pseudonana Hasle & Heimdal
- Thalassiosira punctifera (Grunow) Fryxell, Simonsen & Hasle
- Thalassiosira punctigera (Castracane) Hasle
- Thalassiosira rudolfii (Bachmann) Hasle
- Thalassiosira sackettii Fryxell
- Thalassiosira salvadoriana Hustedt
- Thalassiosira sancettae F.Akiba
- Thalassiosira scotia Fryxell & Hoban
- Thalassiosira scrotiformis G.W.Chen & S.B.Qian
- Thalassiosira simonsenii Hasle & G.Fryxell
- Thalassiosira simplex Hustedt
- Thalassiosira sinica Y.Li. & Y.Q.Guo
- Thalassiosira spinoconvexa F.Akiba & Y.Yanagisawa
- Thalassiosira strelnikovae I.V.Makarova
- Thalassiosira striata D.M.Harwood & T.Maruyama
- Thalassiosira subsalina Proshkina-Lavrenko
- Thalassiosira subtilis (Ostenfeld) Gran
- Thalassiosira sundarbana Samanta & Bhadury
- Thalassiosira symbolophora H.J.Schrader
- Thalassiosira symmetrica G.A.Fryxell & Hasle
- Thalassiosira tealata Takano
- Thalassiosira tenera Proschkina-Lavrenko
- Thalassiosira tertiaria Sheshukova
- Thalassiosira thailandica Boonyapiwat
- Thalassiosira torokina Brady
- Thalassiosira transitoria Y.Tanimura
- Thalassiosira tubifera Fryxell
- Thalassiosira tumida (Janisch) Hasle
- Thalassiosira umaoiensis F.Akiba
- Thalassiosira urahoroensis F.Akiba
- Thalassiosira variabilis I.V.Makarova
- Thalassiosira visurgis Hustedt
- Thalassiosira vulnifica (Gombos) Fenner
- Thalassiosira webbii D.M.Harwood & T.Maruyama
- Thalassiosira wongii Mahood
- Thalassiosira yabei (T.Kanaya) F.Akiba & Y.Yanagisawa
- Thalassiosira yunnaniana Khursevich & Kociolek

== Further references ==
- Nutrient‐and light‐limited growth of Thalassiosira fluviatilis in continuous culture, with implications for phytoplankton growth in the ocean. EA Laws, TT Bannister - Limnology and Oceanography, 1980
- The influence of aqueous iron chemistry on the uptake of iron by the coastal diatom Thalassiosira weissflogii. MA Anderson, FMM Morel, Limnology and Oceanography, 1982
