= Sea spray =

Sea water particles that are formed directly from the ocean

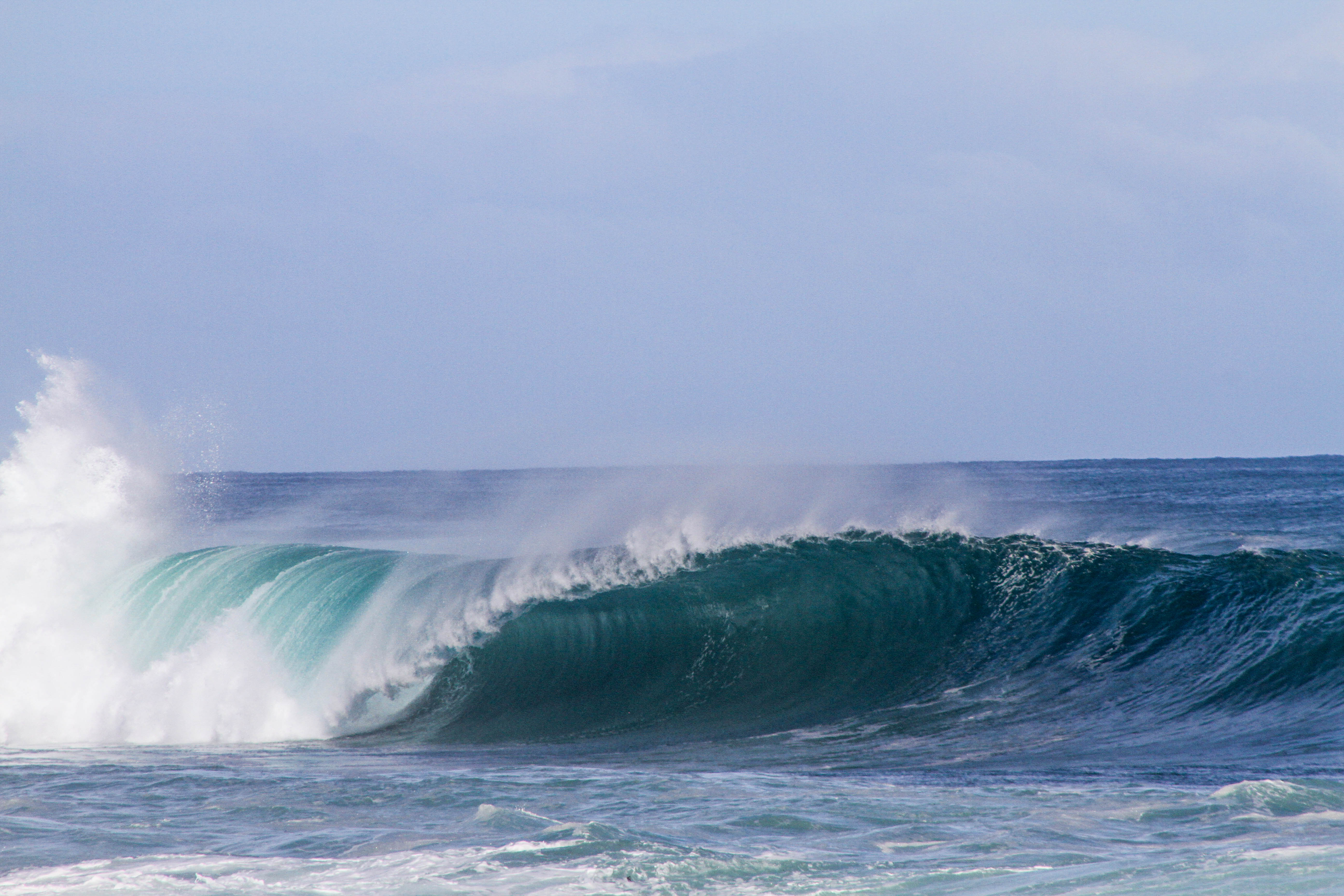
Sea spray generated by breaking surface waves

Sea spray consists of aerosol particles formed from the ocean, primarily by ejection into Earth's atmosphere through bursting bubbles at the air-sea interface. Sea spray contains both organic matter and inorganic salts that form sea salt aerosol (SSA). SSA has the ability to form cloud condensation nuclei (CCN) and remove anthropogenic aerosol pollutants from the atmosphere. Coarse sea spray has also been found to inhibit the development of lightning in storm clouds.

Sea spray is directly (and indirectly, through SSA) responsible for a significant degree of the heat and moisture fluxes between the atmosphere and the ocean, affecting global climate patterns and tropical storm intensity. Sea spray also influences plant growth and species distribution in coastal ecosystems and increases corrosion of building materials in coastal areas.

== Generation ==
=== Formation ===
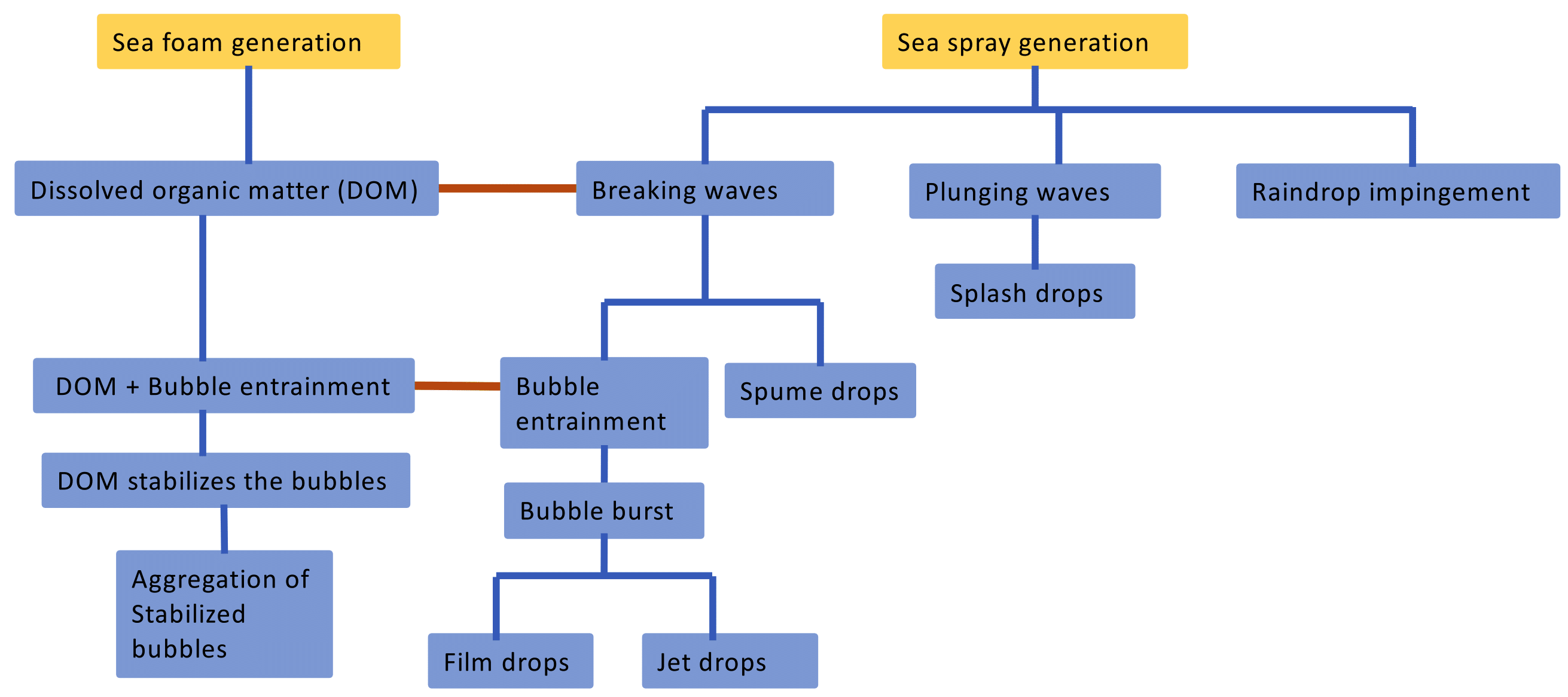
Connection between sea foam and sea spray formation. The dark orange line indicates processes common to the formation of both sea spray and sea foam.

When wind, whitecaps, and breaking waves mix air into the sea surface, the air regroups to form bubbles, floats to the surface, and bursts at the air-sea interface. When they burst, they release up to a thousand particles of sea spray, which range in size from nanometers to micrometers and can be expelled up to 20 cm from the sea surface. Film droplets make up the majority of the smaller particles created by the initial burst, while jet droplets are generated by a collapse of the bubble cavity and are ejected from the sea surface in the form of a vertical jet. In windy conditions, water droplets are mechanically torn off from crests of breaking waves. Sea spray droplets generated via such a mechanism are called spume droplets and are typically larger in size and have less residence time in air. Impingement of plunging waves on sea surface also generates sea spray in the form of splash droplets. The composition of the sea spray depends primarily on the composition of the water from which it is produced, but broadly speaking is a mixture of salts and organic matter. Several factors determine the production flux of sea spray, especially wind speed, swell height, swell period, humidity, and temperature differential between the atmosphere and the surface water. Production and size distribution rate of SSAs are thus sensitive to the mixing state. A lesser studied area of sea spray generation is the formation of sea spray as a result of rain drop impact on the sea surface.

=== Spatial variation ===
In addition to the local conditions that influence sea spray formation, there are also consistent spatial patterns in sea spray production and composition. Because sea spray is generated when air is mixed into the ocean, formation gradients are established by turbulence of the surface water. Wave action along coastal shorelines is generally where turbulence is greatest, so this is where sea spray production is the highest. Particles generated in turbulent coastal areas can travel horizontally up to 25 km within the planetary boundary layer. As distance from shore decreases, sea spray production declines to a level sustained almost exclusively by whitecaps. The proportion of the ocean surface turbulent enough to produce significant sea spray is called the whitecap fraction. The only other production mechanism of sea spray in the open ocean is through direct wind action, where strong winds actually break the surface tension of the water and lift particles into the air. However, particles of seawater generated in this way are often too heavy to remain suspended in the atmosphere and usually are deposited back to the sea within a few dozen meters of transport.

=== Temporal variation ===
During winter months, the ocean typically experiences stormy, windy conditions that generate more air inundation into the sea and therefore more sea spray. Calmer summer months result in lower overall production of sea spray. During peak primary productivity in the summer, increased organic matter in the surface ocean drives subsequent increases in sea spray. Given that sea spray retains the properties of the water from which it was produced, the composition of sea spray experiences extreme seasonal variation. During the summer, dissolved organic carbon (DOC) can constitute 60–90% of sea spray mass. Even though much more sea spray is produced during the stormy winter season, the composition is nearly all salt because of the low primary production.

=== Organic matter ===
The organic matter in sea spray consists of dissolved organic carbon (DOC) and even microbes themselves, like bacteria and viruses. The amount of organic matter in sea spray depends on microbiological processes, though the total effect of these processes is still unknown. Chlorophyll-a is often used as a proxy for primary production and organic matter content in sea spray, but its reliability for estimating dissolved organic carbon concentrations is controversial. Biomass often enters sea spray through the death and lysis of algal cells, often caused by viral infections. Cells are broken apart into the dissolved organic carbon that is propelled into the atmosphere when surface bubbles pop. When primary productivity peaks during the summer, algal blooms can generate an enormous amount of organic matter that is eventually incorporated into sea spray. In the right conditions, aggregation of the dissolved organic carbon can also form surfactant or sea foam.

== Climate interactions ==
At high winds the droplet evaporation layer (DEL) influences the surface energy heat exchange of the ocean. The latent heat flux of sea spray generated at the droplet evaporation layer has been cited as an important addition to climate modeling efforts, particularly in simulations assessing air/sea heat balance as related to hurricanes and cyclones formed during high wind events. During the formation of whitecaps, sea spray droplets exhibit the same properties as the ocean surface, but rapidly adapt to surrounding air. Some sea spray droplets immediately reabsorb into the sea while others evaporate entirely and contribute salt particles like dimethyl sulfide (DMS) to the atmosphere where they can be transported via turbulence to cloud layers and serve as cloud condensation nuclei. The formation of these cloud condensation nuclei like dimethyl sulfide have climate implications as well, due to their influence on cloud formation and interaction with solar radiation. Additionally, the contribution of sea spray DMS to the atmosphere is linked to the global sulfur cycle. Understanding total forcing from natural sources like sea spray can illuminate critical constraints posed by anthropogenic influence and can be coupled with ocean chemistry, biology and physics to predict future ocean and atmospheric variability.

The proportion of organic matter in sea spray can impact reflectance, determine the overall cooling effect of SSAs, and slightly alter the capacity for SSAs to form cloud condensation nuclei (17). Even small changes in SSA levels can affect the global radiation budget leading to implications for global climate. SSA has a low albedo, but its presence overlaid on the darker ocean surface affects absorption and reflectance of incoming solar radiation.

=== Enthalpy flux ===
The influence of sea spray on the surface heat and moisture exchange peaks during times of greatest difference between air and sea temperatures. When air temperature is low, sea spray sensible heat flux can be nearly as great as the spray latent heat flux at high latitudes. In addition, sea spray enhances the air/sea enthalpy flux during high winds as a result of temperature and humidity redistribution in the marine boundary layer. Sea spray droplets injected into the air thermally equilibrate ~1% of their mass. This leads to the addition of sensible heat prior to ocean reentry, enhancing their potential for significant enthalpy input.

=== Dynamic effects ===
The effects of sea spray transport in the atmospheric boundary layer is not yet completely understood. Sea spray droplets alter the air-sea momentum fluxes by being accelerated and decelerated by the winds. In hurricane-force winds, it is observed that there is some reduction in the air/sea momentum flux. This reduction in momentum flux manifests as saturation of air/sea drag coefficient. Some studies have identified spray effects as one of the potential reasons for the air/sea drag coefficient saturation. It has been shown through several numerical and theoretical studies that sea spray, if present in significant amounts in the atmospheric boundary layer, leads to saturation of air-sea drag coefficients.

== Ecology ==
=== Coastal ecosystems ===
Salt deposition from sea spray is the primary factor influencing distribution of plant communities in coastal ecosystems. Ion concentrations of sea spray deposited on land generally mirror their concentrations in the ocean, except that potassium is often higher in sea spray. Deposition of salts on land generally decreases with distance from the ocean but increases with increasing wind speed. Salt deposition from sea spray is correlated with a decrease in plant height and significant scarring, shoot reduction, stem height decrease, and tissue death on the windward side of shrubs and trees. Variation in salt deposition also influences competition between plants and establishes gradients of salt tolerance.

While the salts within sea spray can severely inhibit plant growth in coastal ecosystems, selecting for salt-tolerant species, sea spray can also bring vital nutrients to these habitats. For example, one study showed that sea spray in Wales, UK delivers roughly 32 kg of potassium per hectare to coastal sand dunes each year. Because dune soils leach nutrients very quickly, sea spray fertilization could be very influential to dune ecosystems, especially for plants that are less competitive in nutrient-limited environments.

=== Microbial communities ===
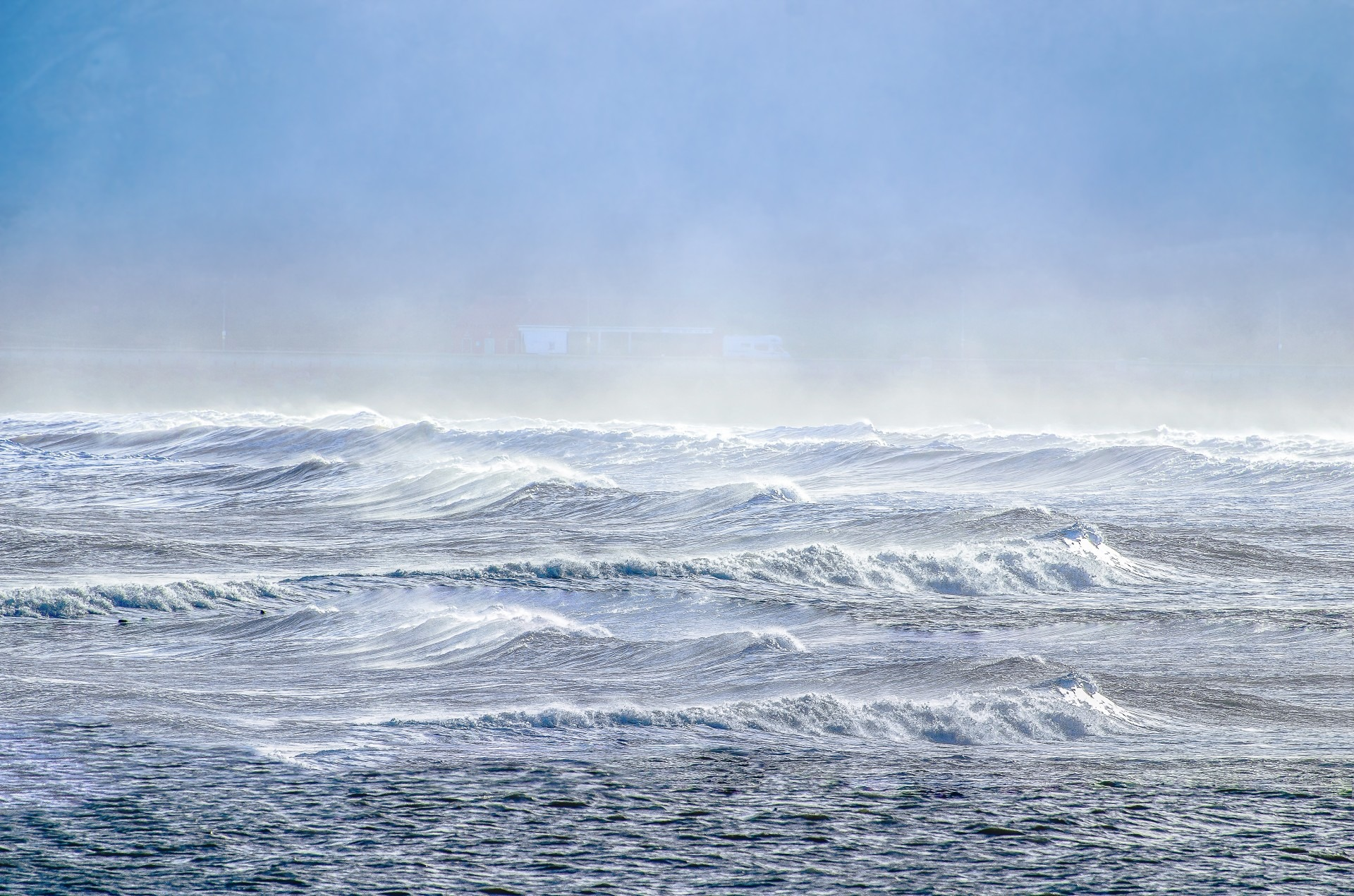
Sea spray containing marine microorganisms can be swept high into the atmosphere where they become aeroplankton. These airborne microorganisms may travel the globe before falling back to earth.

Viruses, bacteria, and plankton are ubiquitous in sea water, and this biodiversity is reflected in the composition of sea spray. Generally speaking, sea spray has slightly lower concentrations of microbes than the water it is produced from. However, the microbial community in sea spray is often distinct from nearby water and sandy beaches, suggesting that some species are more biased towards SSA transportation than others. Sea spray from one beach can contain thousands of operational taxonomic units (OTUs). Nearly 10,000 different OTUs have been discovered in sea spray just between San Francisco, CA and Monterey, CA, with only 11% of them found ubiquitously. This suggests that sea spray in every coastal region likely has its own unique assemblage of microbial diversity, with thousands of new OTUs yet to be discovered. Many of the more common OTUs have been identified to the following taxa: Cryptophyta (order), Stramenopiles (order) and OM60 (family). Many have even been identified to genus: Persicirhabdus, Fluviicola, Synecococcus, Vibrio, and Enterococcus.

Scientists have conjectured a stream of airborne microorganisms circles the planet above weather systems but below commercial air lanes. Some of these peripatetic microorganisms are swept up from terrestrial dust storms, but most originate from the marine microorganisms in sea spray. In 2018 a team of scientists reported that hundreds of millions of viruses and tens of millions of bacteria are deposited daily on every square meter around the planet.

== Chemical resistance ==
Sea spray is largely responsible for corrosion of metallic objects near the coastline, as the salts accelerate the corrosion process in the presence of abundant atmospheric oxygen and moisture. Salts do not dissolve in air directly, but are suspended as fine particulates, or dissolved in microscopic airborne water droplets.

The salt spray test is a measure of material endurance or resistance to corrosion, particularly if the material will be used outdoors and must perform in a mechanical load bearing or otherwise critical role. These results are often of great interest to marine industries, whose products may suffer extreme acceleration of corrosion and subsequent failure due to salt water exposure.

== See also ==
- Coastal erosion
- Cloud reflectivity modification
- Saltwater intrusion
- Sea air
- Wind wave
