= Sea foam =

Foam created by the agitation of seawater

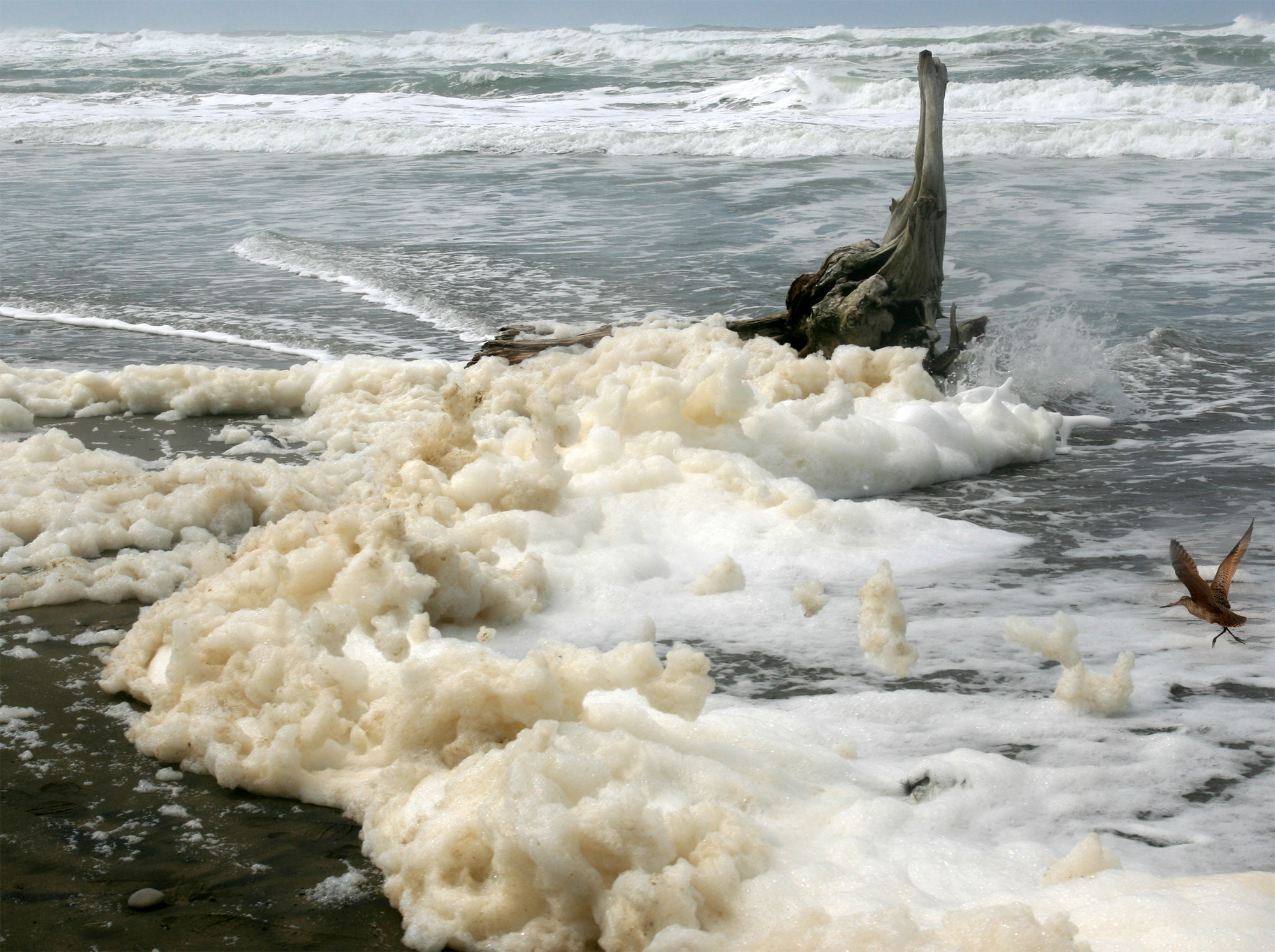
Sea foam washed up or blown onto a beach

Sea foam, ocean foam, or beach foam, is a type of foam created by the agitation of seawater, particularly when it contains higher concentrations of dissolved organic matter (including proteins, lignins, and lipids) derived from sources such as the offshore breakdown of algal blooms. These compounds can act as surfactants or foaming agents. As the seawater is churned by breaking waves in the surf zone adjacent to the shore, the surfactants under these turbulent conditions trap air, forming persistent bubbles that stick to each other through surface tension.

Sea foam is a global phenomenon, and it varies depending on location and the potential influence of the surrounding marine, freshwater, and/or terrestrial environments. Due to its low density and persistence, foam can be blown by strong on-shore winds inland, towards the beach. Human activities, such as production, transport or spillage of petroleum products or detergents, can also contribute to the formation of sea foam.

== Formation ==
Sea foam is formed under conditions that are similar to the formation of sea spray. One of the main distinctions from sea spray formation is the presence of higher concentrations of dissolved organic matter from macrophytes and phytoplankton. The dissolved organic matter in the surface water, which can be derived from the natural environment or human-made sources, provides stability to the resulting sea foam.

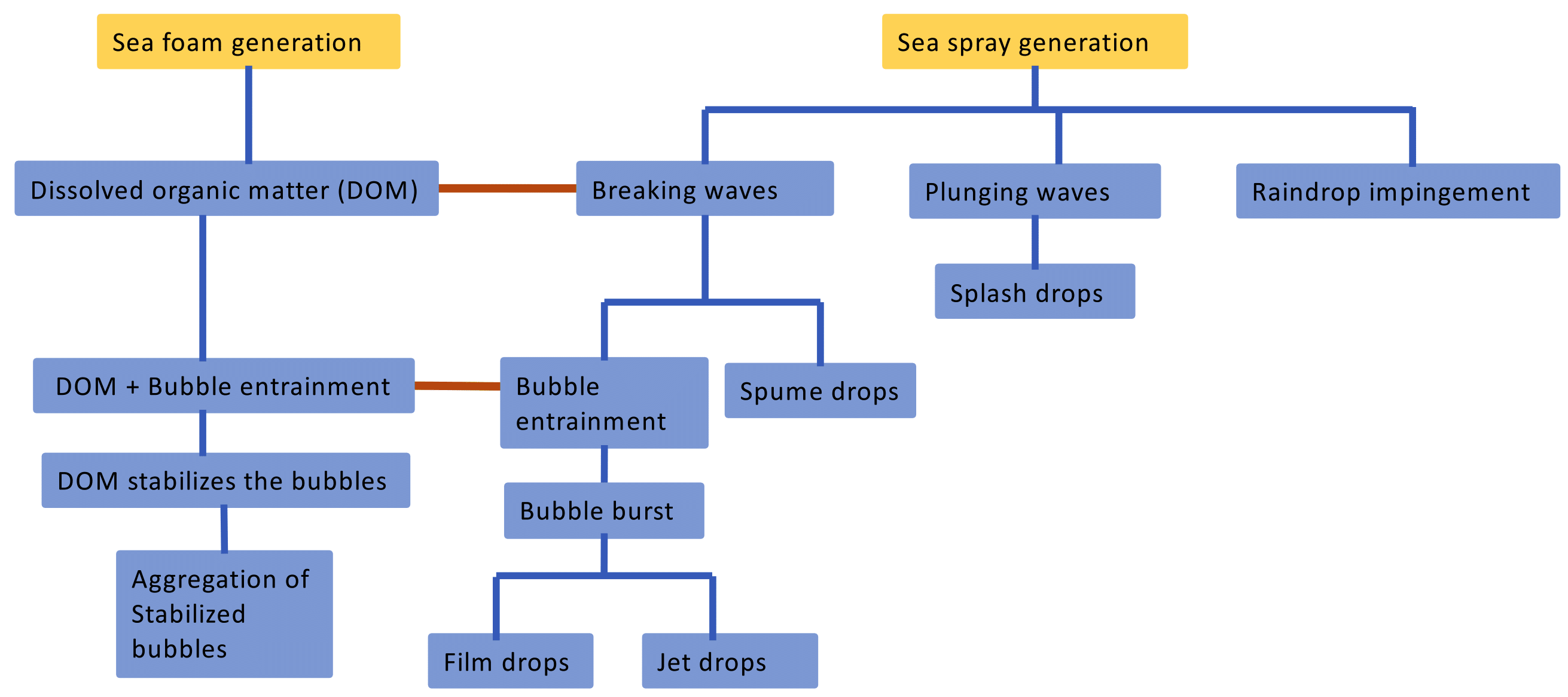
Connection between sea foam and sea spray formation. The dark orange line indicates processes common to the formation of both sea spray and sea foam.

The physical processes that contribute to sea foam formation are breaking surface waves, bubble entrainment, a process of bubbles being incorporated or captured within a liquid such as sea water and whitecap formation. Breaking of surface waves injects air from the atmosphere into the water column, leading to bubble creation. These bubbles get transported around the top few meters of the surface ocean due to their buoyancy. The smallest bubbles entrained in the water column dissolve entirely, leading to higher ratios of dissolved gases in the surface ocean. The bubbles that do not dissolve eventually make it back to the surface. As they rise, these bubbles accumulate hydrophobic substances. Presence of dissolved organic matter stabilizes the bubbles, aggregating together as sea foam. Some studies on sea foam report that breaking of algal cells in times of heavy swells makes sea foam production more likely.

Falling rain drops on the sea surface can also contribute to sea foam formation and destruction. There have been some non-mechanistic studies demonstrating increased sea foam formation due to high rainfall events. Turbulence in the surface mixed layer can affect the concentration of dissolved organic matter and aids in the formation of nutrient-dense foam.

== Composition ==
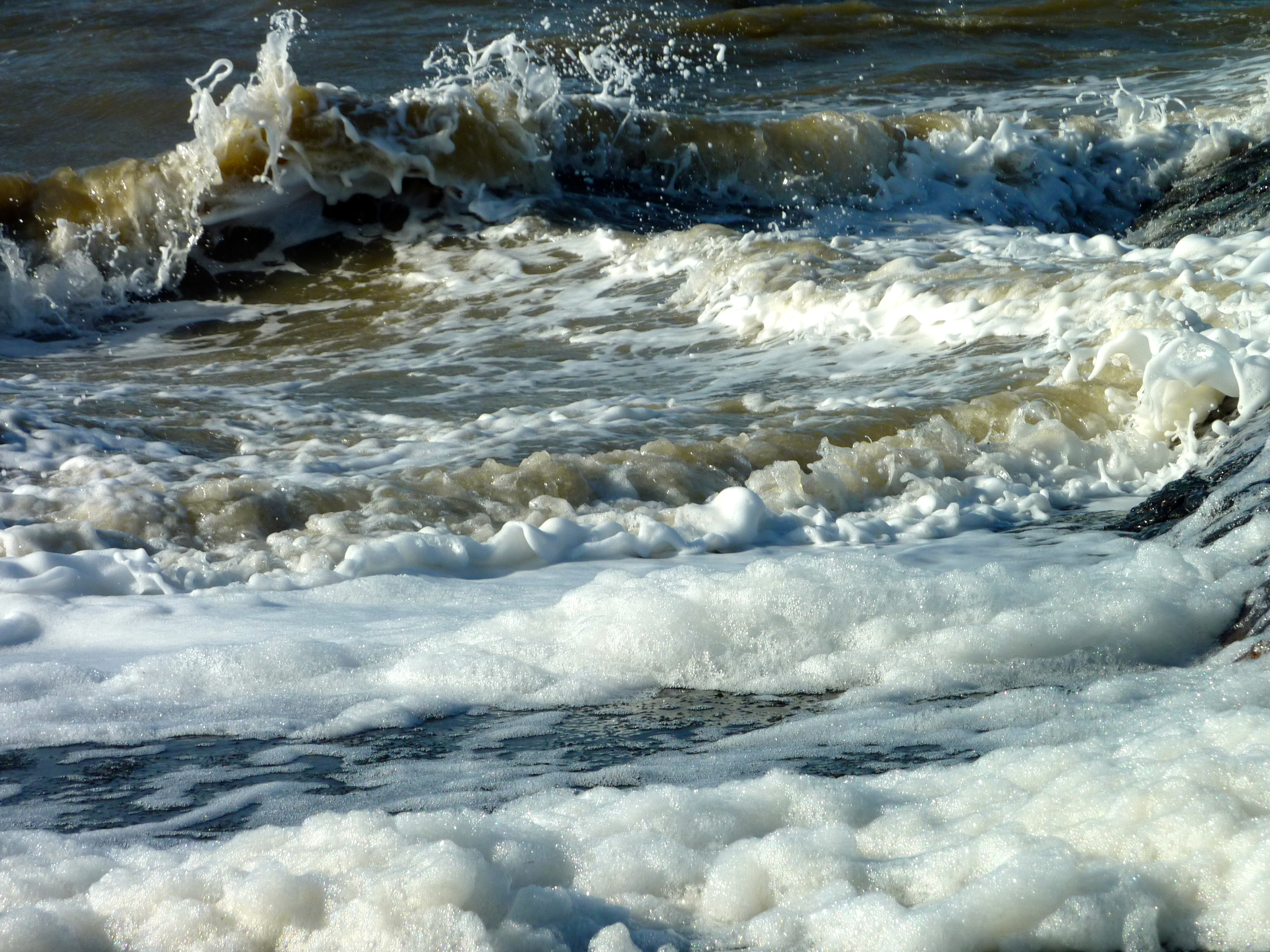
Sea foam usually contains a mixture of decomposed organic materials

The composition of sea foam is generally a mixture of decomposed organic materials, including zooplankton, phytoplankton, algae (including diatoms), bacteria, fungi, protozoans, and vascular plant detritus, though each occurrence of sea foam varies in its specific contents. In some areas, sea foam is found to be made up of primarily protein, dominant in both fresh and old foam, as well as lipids and carbohydrates. The high protein and low carbohydrate concentration suggest that sugars originally present in the surrounding mucilage created by algae or plant matter has been quickly consumed by bacteria. Additional research has shown that a small fraction of the dry weight in sea foam is organic carbon, which contains phenolics, sugars, amino sugars, and amino acids. In the Bay of Fundy, high mortality rates of an abundant tube-dwelling amphipod (Corophium volutator) by natural die-offs as well as predation by migrating seabirds contributed to amino sugars released in the surrounding environment and thus, in sea foam.

The organic matter in sea foam has been found to increase dramatically during phytoplankton blooms in the area. Some research has shown very high concentrations of microplankton in sea foam, with significantly higher numbers of autotrophic phytoplankton than heterotrophs Some foams are particularly rich in their diatom population which can make up the majority of the microalgal biomass in some cases. A diversity of bacteria is also present in sea foam; old foam tends to have a higher density of bacteria. One study found that 95% of sea foam bacteria were rod-shaped, while the surrounding surface water contained mostly coccoid-form bacteria and only 5%–10% rod-shaped bacteria. There is also seasonal variability of sea foam composition; in some regions there is a seasonal occurrence of pollen in sea foam which can alter its chemistry. Though foam is not inherently toxic, it may contain high concentrations of contaminants. Foam bubbles can be coated with or contain these materials which can include petroleum compounds, pesticides, and herbicides.

== Longevity and stability ==
Sea foam off Vancouver Island

Structurally, sea foam is thermodynamically unstable, though some sea foam can persist in the environment for several days at most. There are two types of sea foam categorized based on their stability: 1) Unstable or transient foams have very short lifetimes of only seconds. The bubbles formed in sea foam may burst releasing aerosols into the air, contributing to sea spray. 2) Metastable foams can have a lifetime of several hours to several days; their duration is sometimes attributed to small particles of silica, calcium, or iron which contribute to foam stability and longevity. Additionally, seawater that contains released dissolved organic material from phytoplankton and macrophytic algae that is then agitated in its environment is most likely to produce stable, longer-lasting foam when compared with seawater lacking one of those components. For example, filtered seawater when added to the fronds of the kelp, Ecklonia maxima, produced foam but it lacked the stability that unfiltered seawater provided. Additionally, kelp fronds that were maintained in flowing water therefore reducing their mucus coating, were unable to help foam form. Different types of salt are also found to have varying effects on bubble proximity within sea foam, therefore contributing to its stability.

== Ecological role ==
=== Food source ===
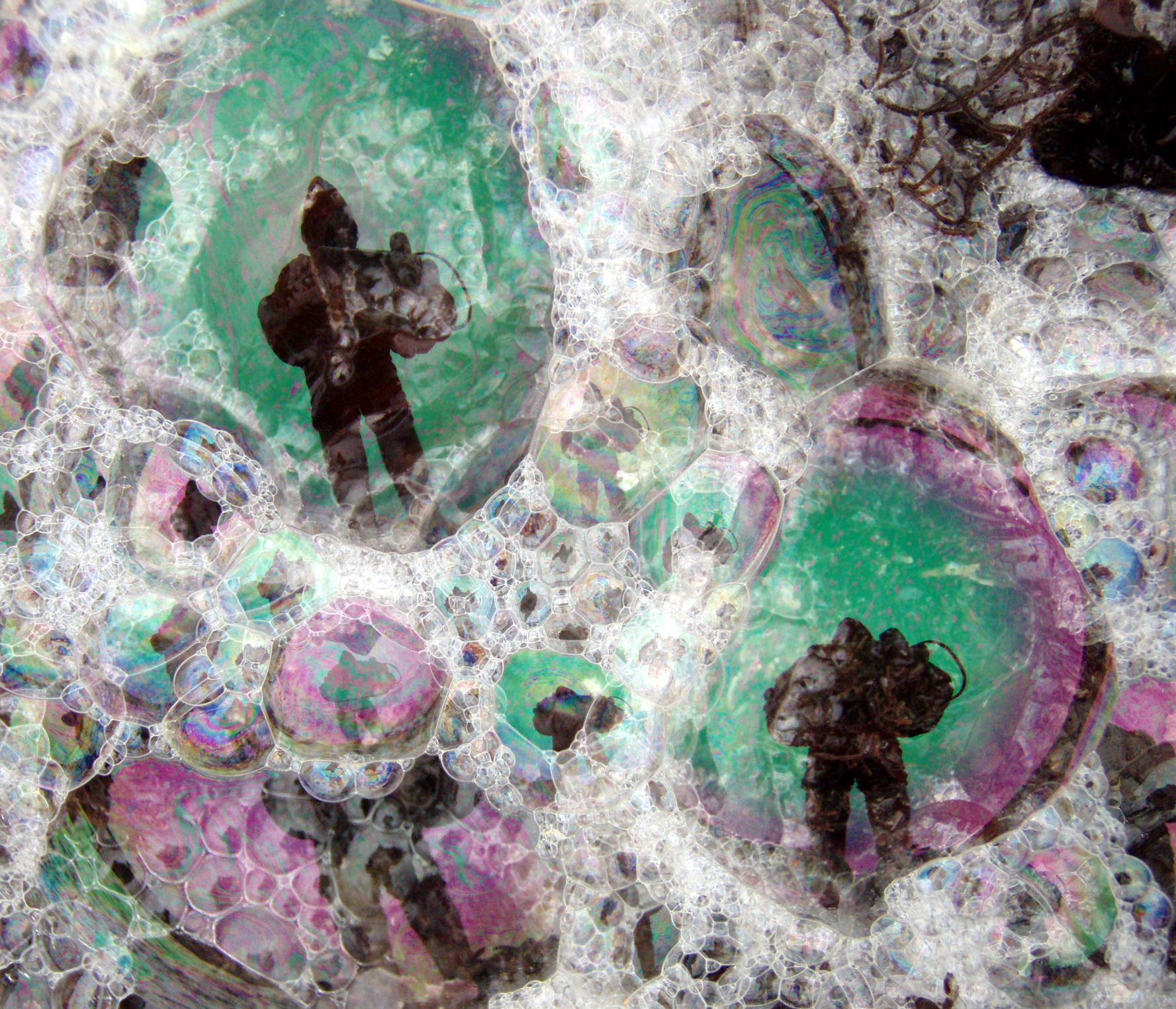
Bubbles of plankton-enriched foam left in a tide pool after high tide

The presence of sea foam in the marine environment plays a number of ecological roles including providing sources of food and creating habitat. As a food source, sea foam with a stable composition is more important ecologically, as it is able to persist longer and can transport nutrients within the marine environment. Longer decay times result in a higher chance that energy contained in sea foam will move up the food web into higher trophic levels. In the Bay of Fundy for example, a tube-dwelling amphipod, Corophium volutator, can potentially attain 70% of its nutritional requirements from the sugars and amino acids derived from sea foam in its environment. At times however, the sea foam was found to be toxic to this species. It is thought that high concentrations of phenolics and/or the occasional presence of heavy metals or pesticides incorporated into the sea foam from the sea surface contributed to its toxicity. On the west coast of Cape Peninsula, South Africa, sea foam often occurs in nearshore marine areas with large kelp beds during periods of strong westerly winds. It is thought that the foam generated in these conditions is an important food source for local organisms due to the presence of organic detritus in the sea foam.

=== Material transport ===
Sea foam also acts as a mode of transport for both organisms and nutrients within the marine environment and, at times, into the intertidal or terrestrial environments. Wave action can deposit foam into intertidal areas where it can remain when the tide recedes, bringing nutrients to the intertidal zone. Additionally, sea foam can become airborne in windy conditions, transporting materials between marine and terrestrial environments. The ability of sea foam to transport materials is also thought to benefit macroalgal organisms, as macroalgae propagules can be carried to different microenvironments, thus influencing the tidal landscape and contributing to new possible ecological interactions. As sea foam is a wet environment, it is conducive habitat to algal spores where propagules can attach to the substrate and avoid risk of dissemination. When sea foam contains fungi, it can also aid in the decomposition of plant and animal remains in coastal ecosystems.

=== Habitat ===
Additionally, sea foam is a habitat for a number of marine microorganisms. Some research has shown the presence of various microphytoplanktonic, nanophytoplanktonic, and diatom groups in seafoam; the phytoplankton groups appeared in significantly higher abundance than in sea surface film and the top pelagic zone.

== Hazards ==
=== Toxicity ===
Naturally occurring sea foam is not inherently toxic; however, it can be exposed to high concentrations of contaminants in the surface microlayer derived from the breakdown of algal blooms, fossil fuel production and transport, and stormwater runoff. These contaminants contribute to the formation of noxious sea foam through adsorption onto bubbles. Bubbles may burst and release toxins into the atmosphere in the form of sea spray or aerosol, or they may persist in foams. Toxins released through aerosols and breaking bubbles can be inhaled by humans. The microorganisms that occupy sea foams as habitat have increased susceptibility for contaminant exposure. Consequently, these toxic substances can be integrated into the trophic food web.

=== Harmful algal blooms ===
Foams can form following the degradation of harmful algal blooms (HABs). These are primarily composed of algal species, but can also consist of dinoflagellates and cyanobacteria. Biomass from algae in the bloom is integrated into sea foam in the sea surface microlayer. When the impacted sea foam breaks down, toxins from the algae are released into the air causing respiratory issues and occasionally initiating asthma attacks. Phaeocystis globosa is one algal species that is considered problematic, as observed in a study in the Netherlands. Its high biomass accumulation allows it to create large quantities of toxic foam that often wash onto beaches. P. globosa blooms are initiated in areas of high nutrient availability, often affiliated with coastal locations with a lot of stormwater runoff and eutrophication. Studies suggest that the development of foam is directly correlated to blooms caused by P. globosa, despite that foam formation typically occurs approximately two weeks after the appearance of an algal bloom offshore. Organic material from P. globosa was observed decomposing while suspended at the sea surface, but was not observed lower in the water column. P. globosa is also considered a nuisance species because its large foam formations impair the public's ability to enjoy the beach.

=== Human activities ===
While sea foam is a common result of the agitation of seawater mixing with organic material in the surface ocean, human activities can contribute to the production of excess and often toxic foam. In addition to the organic oils, acids, and proteins that amass in the sea surface microlayer, compounds derived from petroleum production and transport, synthetic surfactants, and pesticide use can enter the sea surface and be incorporated into foam. The pollutants present can also affect the persistence of the foam produced. Crude oil discharged from tankers, motor oil, sewage, and detergents from polluted runoff can create longer-lasting foams. In one study, polychlorinated biphenyls (PCBs), a persistent organic pollutant, were found to amass in sea foams. Some experts and health authorities recommend avoiding contact with sea foam in lakes and rivers and seas that are contaminated with PFAS, since these substances were found to accumulate in sea foam in high concentrations. Man-made microplastic pollution can accumulate in breaking waves and increase sea foam stability.

Natural gas terminals have been cited as contributors to the production of modified foams due to the process of using seawater to convert natural gas to liquified natural gas. One study showed a much greater abundance of heterotrophic prokaryotes (archaea and bacteria) and cyanobacteria in foam that was generated near a liquified natural gas terminal. These prokaryotes were able to recycle chemical materials discharged from the terminal, which enhanced microbial growth. Additionally, higher levels of total organic carbon (TOC) and plankton biomass were recorded in foam generated in close proximity to the terminal. Organic carbon was transferred readily into the pelagic food web after uptake by prokaryotes and ingestion by grazers.

== Notable occurrences ==
- 24 August 2007: A large buildup of sea foam occurred on the coast of Yamba, northern New South Wales.
- January–February 2008: Sea foam occurrences at Caloundra and Point Cartwright on Queensland's Sunshine Coast attracted world-wide media attention.
- December 2011: The coast road at Cleveleys, Lancashire was swamped by meter-high drifts of sea foam.
- 2012: During live coverage of Hurricane Irene in Ocean City, Maryland, Tucker Barnes was covered in sea foam.
- 24–25 September 2012: Following storms and high winds, the beach front of the Footdee area of Aberdeen was engulfed with sea foam.
- 27–28 January 2013: The Sunshine Coast in Queensland, Australia had masses of foam wash up on land from ex-tropical Cyclone Oswald.
- June 2016: Sea foam occurred across the East coast of Australia, whipped up by storms.
- 28 March 2017: Sea foam was generated by Cyclone Debbie at Sarina Beach in Queensland, Australia.
- 16 October 2017: Hurricane Ophelia covered Cleveleys, Lancashire with spume.
- January 2018: Storm Eleanor causes widespread foam to appear across coastal Europe.
- 11 October 2019: Subtropical storm Melissa brought sea foam to Nantasket Beach in Hull, Massachusetts.
- 21 January 2020: Storm Gloria floods Tossa de Mar, Spain, with thick sea foam on top of major flooding.
- 11 May 2020: Five surfers die in The Netherlands, presumably upon drowning after becoming disoriented in over 2 meters thick sea foam.
- 13 July 2020: The Cape Town storm, South Africa

== See also ==
- Aphrodite § Birth
- Foam line – Accumulations of foam on the surface of freshwater water courses or bodies
- Pumice – Volcanic rock
- Spume Island – Island in Palmer Archipelago, Antarctica
