= Skeletonema marinoi =

Scientific classification
- Domain: Eukaryota
- Clade: Sar
- Clade: Stramenopiles
- Division: Ochrophyta
- Clade: Bacillariophyta
- Class: Thalassiosirophyceae
- Order: Thalassiosirales
- Family: Thalassiosiraceae
- Genus: Skeletonema
- Species: S. marinoi

Binomial name
- Skeletonema marinoi Sarno & Zingone, 2005

Species of single-celled organism

Skeletonema marinoi is a diatom. Together with S. dohrnii, this species has flattened extremities of the processes of the fultoportulae, which interlock with those of succeeding valves without forming knuckles.

In 2025, a 7,000 year old strain of S. marinoi was resurrected from a core of anoxic Baltic Sea sediment, with cells that were as viable as its modern descendants.

== See also ==
- Imidazolium
- Pyridinium
- Chlorella vulgaris
