= Spicaticribra =

Scientific classification
- Domain: Eukaryota
- Supergroup: Stramenopiles
- Division: Ochrophyta
- Clade: Bacillariophyta
- Class: Thalassiosirophyceae
- Order: Thalassiosirales
- Family: Thalassiosiraceae
- Genus: Spicaticribra; J.R. Johansen, Kociolek & R. L. Lowe, 2008

Genus of diatoms

Spicaticribra is a genus of diatoms belonging to the family Thalassiosiraceae.

== Species ==
According to AlgaeBase:

- Spicaticribra inlandica (Hayashi) Khursevich & Kociolek
- Spicaticribra kamszatica (Lupikina) Khursevich & Kociolek
- Spicaticribra kilarskii (Kaczmarska) Kociolek & Khursevich
