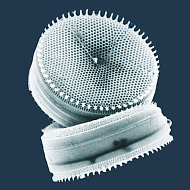
- Conticribra weissflogii

Scientific classification
- Domain: Eukaryota
- Supergroup: Stramenopiles
- Division: Ochrophyta
- Clade: Bacillariophyta
- Class: Thalassiosirophyceae
- Order: Thalassiosirales
- Family: Thalassiosiraceae
- Genus: Conticribra; K. Stachura-Suchoples & D.M. Williams, 2009

= Conticribra =

Genus of diatoms

Conticribra is a genus of diatoms belonging to the family Thalassiosiraceae.

== Species ==
According to the World Register of Marine Species:

- Conticribra sinica P.Yu, Q.You & Q.Wang, 2022
- Conticribra weissflogii (Grunow) K.Stachura-Suchoples & D.M.Williams, 2009
- Conticribra weissflogiopsis J.S.Park & J.H.Lee, 2014
