= Mediolabrus =

Scientific classification
- Domain: Eukaryota
- Clade: Diaphoretickes
- Clade: Sar
- Clade: Stramenopiles
- Phylum: Gyrista
- Subphylum: Ochrophytina
- Class: Bacillariophyceae
- Order: Thalassiosirales
- Family: Thalassiosiraceae
- Genus: Mediolabrus; Yang Li

Type species
- Mediolabrus comicus (H.Takano) Yang Li

Species
- Mediolabrus comicus; Mediolabrus ocellatus; Mediolabrus spinulosus

Genus of single-celled algae

Mediolabrus is a genus of centric diatoms within the family Thalassiosiraceae. Known Mediolabrus species live planktonically in brackish and fresh water. This genus, together with the related Minidiscus, includes some of the smallest diatom species with diameters as small as 1.9 μm (in M. comicus).

== Taxonomy ==
Genus Mediolabrus was erected in 2020 based on molecular phylogenetics, by transferring three species from the genus Minidiscus.

== Morphology and ultrastructure ==
The lenticular or spherical cells, smaller than 10 μm, live solitarily or in flocks. The valves (ends of the siliceous shell) are domed, with sloping mantle (side of the valve). The areolae (regularly repeated pores) are internally covered by individual, radially continuous cribra (perforated plates) and lack typical foramens (large openings) externally. At the edge of the valve face or close to the mantle are several fultoportulae (tube-like pores). There is only one rimoportula (lip-like pore) and no fultoportulae in the center or sub-center of the valve. Only a single rimoportula near the valve center is a diagnostic feature of this genus and the source of its name.

== See also ==
- Smallest organisms
