= Spume Island =

Island in Palmer Archipelago, Antarctica

- Location within Antarctica

Geography
- Location: Antarctica
- Coordinates: 64°48′S 64°07′W
- Archipelago: Palmer Archipelago

Administration
- Administered under the Antarctic Treaty System

Demographics
- Population: 0

Spume Island is a small, low, rocky island lying 2.4 km (1.5 mi) southwest of Bonaparte Point, off the southwest coast of Anvers Island in the Palmer Archipelago of Antarctica. It is located at 64°48′S 64°07′W. Spume Island was surveyed by the British Naval Hydrographic Survey Unit, 1956–1957. Spume Island was named by the United Kingdom Antarctic Place-names Committee (UK-APC) because heavy seas break over the island in a gale; spume is blown over it.

== See also ==
- Composite Antarctic Gazetteer
- List of Antarctic and sub-Antarctic islands
- List of Antarctic islands south of 60° S
- SCAR
- Territorial claims in Antarctica
