= Téthys II =

Research vessel

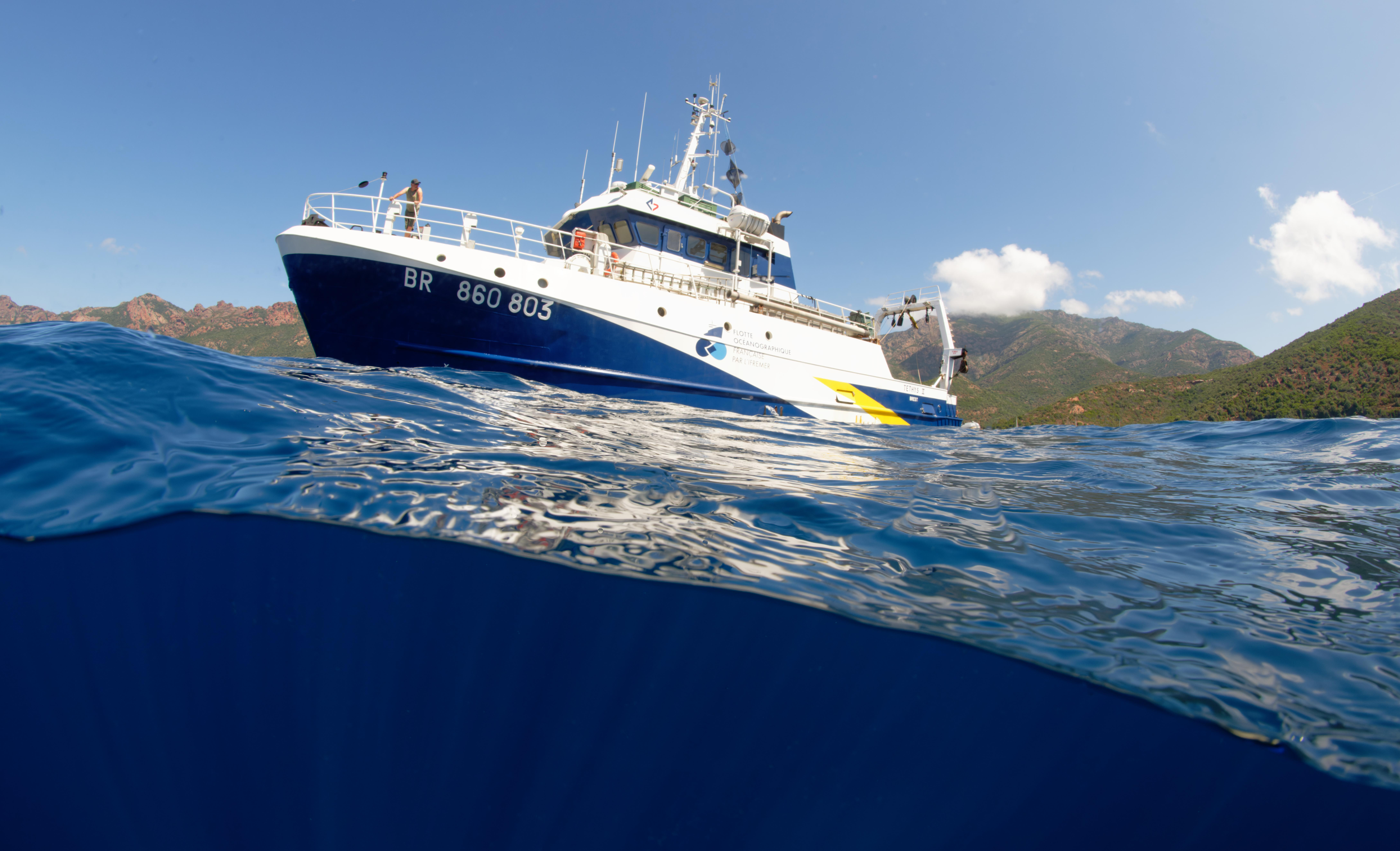
- Téthys II, photo by Dugornay Olivier (2021)

History

France
- Name: Téthys II
- Owner: Ifremer
- Operator: Genavir
- Port of registry: France
- Builder: Piriou, Concarneau, France
- Completed: 1993
- Identification: IMO number: 9066007; MMSI number: 227212000; Callsign: FGTO
- Status: Active as of 2025

General characteristics
- Class & type: research vessel
- Type: Fishing vessel specialized in coastal oceanographic research
- Displacement: 224 tonnes
- Length: 24.90 m
- Beam: 7.50 m
- Draught: 3.20 m
- Propulsion: conventional diesel electric, POYAUD UD 25V12 478 kW at 1300 rpm
- Speed: 11 knots
- Endurance: 10 days at 11 knots
- Capacity: As a category 2 vessel (up to 200 nautical miles from a safe haven): 8 scientists, technicians, and hydrographers; For trips at sea lasting up to 24 h and in accordance with category 3 rules (up to 20 nautical miles from a safe haven): 12 scientists, technicians, and hydrographers; Two scientific laboratories: total surface area 14 m^{2}; Scientific office space on the bridge: 3 m^{2}; Afterdeck surface area: 22 m^{2}; Space for one 10 ft container on the afterdeck
- Crew: 7
- Sensors & processing systems: Echo sounder, Simrad EA600, dual frequency 12 kHz & 200 kHz; Echo sounder, JMC F-3000, dual frequency 50 kHz & 200 kHz; GPS, 2 antennas, HEMISPHERE VS330 (position, heading and attitude; screens available on DB9 sockets on the bridge, in the wet lab and in the dry lab); ADCP, hull fitted, RDI 75 kHz (acquisition of current data); Weather station Batos Météo France; Fluorometer, 10-AU-005-CE, Turner Designs; Thermosalinometer, SBE 21; Boom for acoustic equipment

Téthys II is a French oceanographic research vessel owned by Ifremer. It is used for scientific research mainly in the Mediterranean Sea, with missions lasting around ten days and up to 200 miles from the port. Téthys II is equipped with instruments for marine geosciences, physical oceanography, biological oceanography, biogeochemistry, and marine chemistry. Its twin vessel is the Côtes de la Manche.

== See also ==
- List of research vessels by country
- Other research vessels operated by Ifremer:
  - Pourquoi Pas ?
  - Thalassa
  - Le Suroît

== Links ==
- Fiche technique
