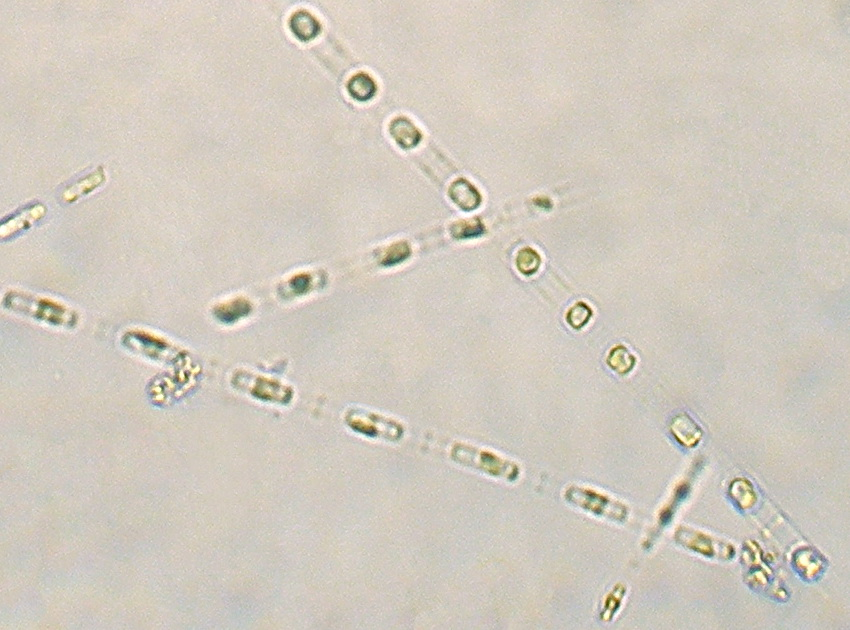

Scientific classification
- Domain: Eukaryota
- Supergroup: Stramenopiles
- Division: Ochrophyta
- Clade: Bacillariophyta
- Class: Thalassiosirophyceae
- Order: Thalassiosirales
- Family: Thalassiosiraceae
- Genus: Skeletonema
- Species: S. costatum

Binomial name
- Skeletonema costatum (Greville) Cleve, 1866

= Skeletonema costatum =

Species of single-celled organism

Skeletonema costatum is a cosmopolitan centric diatom that belongs to the genus Skeletonema. It was first described by R. K. Greville, who originally named it Melosira costata, in 1866. It was later renamed by Cleve in 1873 and was more narrowly defined by Zingone et al. and Sarno et al. Skeletonema costatum is the most well known species of the genus Skeletonema and is often one of the dominant species responsible for red tide events.

The diatom S. costatum is known for its carbon acquisition mechanisms, and it has been used in the production of biofuel and as a feed for aquaculture. The organism is appealing for commercial use due to its high photosynthetic efficiency, high tolerance to pH, temperature, and salinity changes, high lipid and fatty acid content, and rapid growth rate.

== Structure and morphology ==
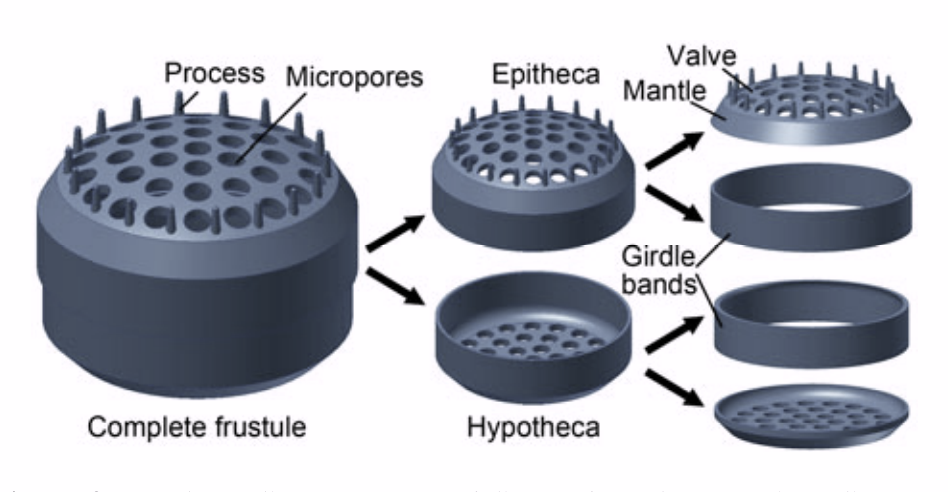
Structure of a centric diatom

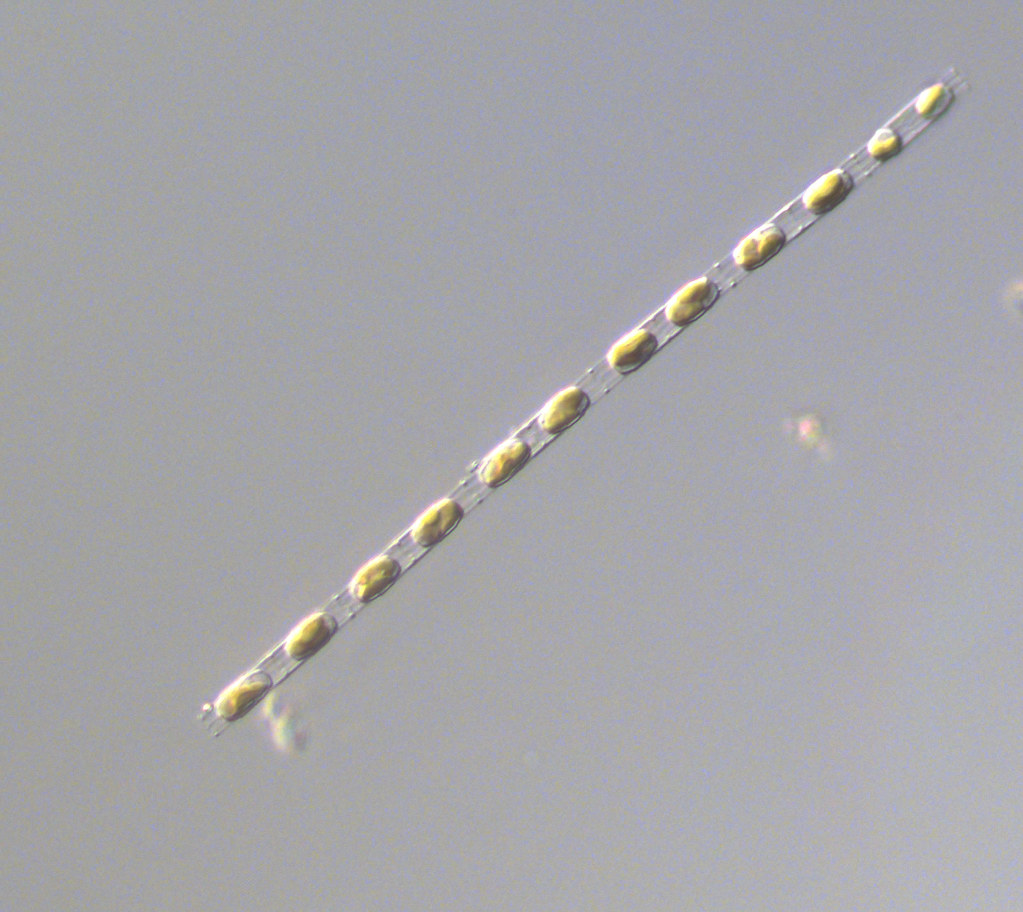
A single chain of Skeletonema costatum cells from a field sample from Long Island Sound

Cells belonging to S. costatum are single-celled but exist as long chains of about 6 to 24 cells but can be up to 60 cells in length. As with all diatoms, the siliceous cell wall (frustule) consists of two interlocking components ("like two halves of a petri dish"), the hypotheca and the epitheca. Each cell is approximately 8 to 12 μm in diameter and about 3.5 to 11.5 μm apart from each other. The cells are connected by long straight fultoportula processes and contain up to 2 chloroplasts per cell. Processes are tube-like silicified projections that protrude from the valve wall. Fultoportula processes, also known as strutted processes, protrude through the valve wall with 2 or more satellite pores surrounding them. Fultoportula processes are only found in the centric order Thalassiosirales. Each fultoportula process in S. costatum has 3 satellite pores and terminal fultoportulae processes with claw-like tips.

Cells belonging to S. costatum are cylindrically-shaped cells and have a ring of long flattened intercalary fultoportula processes protruding from the periphery of each valve, each closed along their entire length. Each intercalary fultoportula has a longitudinal suture extending from an external pore at its base to its tip.

Intercalary fultoportula processes of adjacent valves are connected at a 1:2 junction, where each process interlocks with two more, creating a "zigzag appearance". This 1:2 junction is a distinctive feature of S. costatum. Their intercalary rimoportula are positioned marginally, they have long terminal rimoportula, and their girdle band features rows of pores. Each valve has one of their fultoportulae replaced with a rimoportula, identified by its longer external process and the "spoutlike teapot"-shaped tip of the terminal rimoportulae.

=== Morphologically similar species ===
Among species in the genus Skeletonema, S. costatum is most morphologically similar to S. subsalsum, with both species exhibiting rows of small pores between the parallel rows of transverse branching ribs on their girdle bands. They are also the only two Skeletonema species with long intercalary rimoportula processes. Diatoms in the species S. costatum can be identified by the persistent presence of a 1:2 junction, and the closed tubules of its intercalary fultoportulae processes. Skeletonema subsalsum will sometimes have a 1:1 junction.

=== Morphological variation ===
The morphological plasticity of S. costatum cells has been extensively studied. Castillo (1995) attributes significant variations in morphological features, such as cell diameter, number of cells per chain, and the length of intercalary processes, with variations in environmental conditions, most notably, salinity. If cultured in freshwater, S. costatum develops short intercellular processes and is observed to seemingly not have space between sibling valves at 1 psu.

== Taxonomy ==
As of 2021, 21 species in the genus Skeletonema were "identified and taxonomically accepted", with S. costatum being one of them.

Skeletonema costatum was first described by R. K. Greville in 1866 when it was originally called Melosira costata. It was later renamed by Cleve in 1873. Skeletonema costatum has since been more narrowly defined, with numerous species previously attributed to S. costatum identified as distinct species.

The species originally described by Greville is often referred to as S. costatum sensu lato (s. l.), which represents multiple different species with similar morphological traits. The species granted the original epithet, costatum, was the species more narrowly described by Zingone et al. (2005) after reexamination of the type materials of S. costatum using electron microscopy and molecular analysis of rDNA. Zingone et al. (2005) identified two distinct morphologies within the type material, describing the less abundant morphology as S. grevillei and the more abundant morphology as the original epithet, costatum. The latter was assigned the original epithet due to its closer similarity to the specimen originally described by Greville, which he had conveniently marked. The two morphologies differed in their frustule ultrastructures, including "the shape of FPPs [fultoportula processes], the type of interlocking between IFPPs [intercalary fultoportula processes] of sibling valves, and the cingular band ornamentation". S. costatum sensu stricto (s. s.) can be used to describe the more narrowly defined S. costatum species to differentiate it from S. costatum sensu lato. S. costatum sensu stricto (s. s.) has also been referred to as S. costatum (Greville) Cleve emend. Zingone and Sarno.

== Distribution and habitat ==
Skeletonema costatum is widely distributed geographically, apart from the Antarctic Ocean. It is found around the world, including off the coasts of Hong Kong Island, Florida, USA, Uruguay, Brazil, Northern Queensland, Australia, China, and the Sea of Japan.

Skeletonema costatum primarily resides in the neritic zone and is commonly found in brackish waters as opposed to the more oceanic, S. tropicum. Skeletonema costatum is frequently the dominant phytoplankton species in coastal waters and the dominant species responsible for red tide events. Although the dominant species in red tide events at a given area can change over time, there are studies on red tide events in China in which S. costatum was dominant. This include the Yangtze River estuary in the interior of China, Hongsha Bay of Sanya in the South China Sea, and in Fujian coastal waters.

=== Yangtze River Estuary red tide outbreaks ===
Skeletonema costatum is one of the dominant species responsible for red tide outbreaks and blooms frequently occur in the Yangtze River estuary and adjacent waters in China. Of the red tide outbreaks in the Yangtze River estuary between 1972 and 2009, S. costatum occurred during 20% of the 174 recorded outbreaks. Over 50% of the outbreaks in this area occurred during May. After 2000, outbreaks of areal extents larger than 1000 km^{2} became more common. Nutrient applications from floods, fertilizers and other anthropogenic contributions in this area are suspected to have contributed to the blooms.

== Growth and environmental conditions ==
=== Temperature ===
Skeletonema costatum grows at a range temperatures from 2 to 31.5 °C, but members of this species grow optimally at 25 °C. The strains of S. costatum from the Sea of Japan off the coast of Dōkai Bay prefer warmer temperatures, and are only collected from water above 20 °C. At this temperature, their specific growth rates were measured as above 1.0 d^{−1}.

=== Salinity ===
Skeletonema costatum can grow in salinity conditions of 0 to 35 psu. As such, S. costatum can thrive in a variety of ocean environments ranging from oceanic to marine estuary and even riverine environments. Its optimal growth was found to be at a salinity range of 18 to 35 psu. The salinity tolerance of S. costatum is especially ideal in estuariane waters where salinities fluctuate, corroborated by the presence of this diatom as one of the dominant species in estuaries.

Although some strains of S. costatum such as SZN B202 exhibit rapid growth rates in salinities of 1 to 2 psu, members of this species generally show decreased growth outside its optimal salinity range. Decreased number of cells in a chain or decreased distance in between cells is observed at stress salinity conditions.

=== Light levels ===
Skeletonema costatum is most likely to grow under conditions of high illumination. The highest growth rate was found to be 1.6 × 10^{16} quanta s^{−1}cm^{−2}, but there is still a positive growth rate in low-light conditions of about 0.02 × 10^{16} quanta s^{−1}cm^{−2}. There is some debate over the different Skeletonema species and their classification, as many of these different species within the genus bloom in different seasons around the world. S. costatum is a highly adaptable species, and it has the potential to bloom during all seasons. This diatom is more dependent on the water quality than photoperiod lengths for bloom formation, though it is especially common to have a large bloom during the early spring and late summer.

High exposure to UVB radiation can have dramatic effects on the quality of S. costatum as a food source to marine invertebrates, marked by a decrease in fatty acid and amino acid contents of the individual S. costatum cells in these conditions.

The high partial pressures of dissolved CO_{2} associated with climate change have a positive effect on the growth rate of S. costatum in the spring and fall when there is equal parts light and dark in a day (12h light:12 h dark). The high partial pressure of CO_{2} was also found to reduce the growth rate of S. costatum in the winter (8h light:16h dark) but had no effect on its growth rate in the summer (16h light:8h dark).

At 20 °C, S. costatum can grow under irradiance of 7 to 406 μmol/m^{2}s. Photoinhibition is observed at 700 μmol/m^{2}s, at which point a decrease in photosynthetic ability of the diatom is detected.

=== Nutrients ===
Skeletonema costatum blooms in eutrophic waters that are often loaded with nitrogen, phosphorus, and other nutrients/minerals in both dissolved and particulate forms. The eutrophic conditions that house S. costatum blooms are often limited in carbon dioxide, as there is heavy competition for this limiting resource. It has been shown that nitrate enrichment and waters high in nitrate have the ability to stimulate S. costatum growth through the action of enhanced competitive photosynthetic activity in a CO_{2-}limited environment. Phosphate can also be a limiting nutrient to S. costatum as phosphate-rich waters were found to have a stimulating effect on S. costatum growth rates in CO_{2}-limited environments. High concentrations of nitrates and phosphates increase the amount of inorganic carbon in the form of bicarbonate fixed by S. costatum.

Iron is an essential nutrient in primary production as it is used in processes of photosynthesis and is under high competition among marine diatoms. One of the reasons S. costatum is able to outcompete other primary producers is its relatively high uptake rates of iron. S. costatum also has a low cellular demand for iron and is able to obtain this nutrient more efficiently than other phytoplankton.

== Major viral pathogens ==
=== Skeletonema costatum-infecting virus (ScosV) ===
Skeletonema costatum-infecting virus (ScosV) is a novel algal virus isolated in 2008 from seawater samples taken in Jaran Bay, South Korea, which infects and lyses specific strains of S. costatum, particularly ME-SCM-1. In 2015, it was characterized as having an icosahedral shape and a diameter of approximately 40 to 50 nm. Upon infection of S. costatum, ScosV spends about less than 48 to 80 hours reproducing in the cytoplasm before causing lysis of host cells at a burst size range of 90 to 250 infectious units/cell.

== Ecological significance ==
Marine diatoms account for about 20% of the world's primary production and considering that S. costatum is one of the most abundant species blooming in the ocean indicates that it is one of the major producers of oxygen. Skeletonema costatum plays an important role in the acquisition of both organic and inorganic carbon, in the form of HCO_{3}^{−}, in our oceans, collecting CO_{2} out of the atmosphere and reducing the effects of ocean acidification.

Eutrophic waters, as a result of aquaculture operations in nearshore marine environments such as shrimp farms, create especially favorable conditions for S. costatum growth. It has been reported that S. costatum-dominated red tide algal blooms in these eutrophic waters have led to considerable depletion of phosphate that remained at a low level for a long time after the bloom disappeared. These conditions lead to decreased abundance in other phytoplankton species and have potential in impacting the ecosystem in the area where the bloom occurs.

It has been suggested that S. costatum may be useful in the remediation of heavy metals from ocean ecosystems as it has a high affinity for iron and other heavy metals like manganese.

== Human applications ==
=== Aquaculture feed ===
Skeletonema costatum has been cultivated for use in aquaculture as feed for fish, shrimp, oysters, crab larvae, and more.

=== Production of biofuels ===
Skeletonema costatum is used in biofuel production because of its high lipid and fatty acid content, rapid growth rate, high photosynthetic efficiency, and high tolerance to variations in pH, temperature, and salinity levels. When exposed to stress conditions such as depleted silicon and phosphate concentrations and high irradiation, it produces neutral lipids like triacylglycerol (TAG) which are ideal for making biofuel. These TAGs are extracted and converted to fatty acid methyl esters (FAME), which are molecules comprising the biofuel, using direct transesterification.

=== Production of natural products ===
Skeletonema costatum is also a source of natural products, which are secondary metabolites produced by microorganisms that can be used in pharmaceutical applications. The extracts of this diatom were found to have prospective use as a central nervous system relaxant that acts like an anti-dopaminergic drug with anticholinergic effects. It also has potential as an antipsychotic drug. Aside from these, antibacterial active compounds extracted from S. costatum using ethanol and methanol were also found to inhibit certain human pathogens, such as Staphylococcus aureus, Proteus mirabilis, and Vibrio cholerae.
