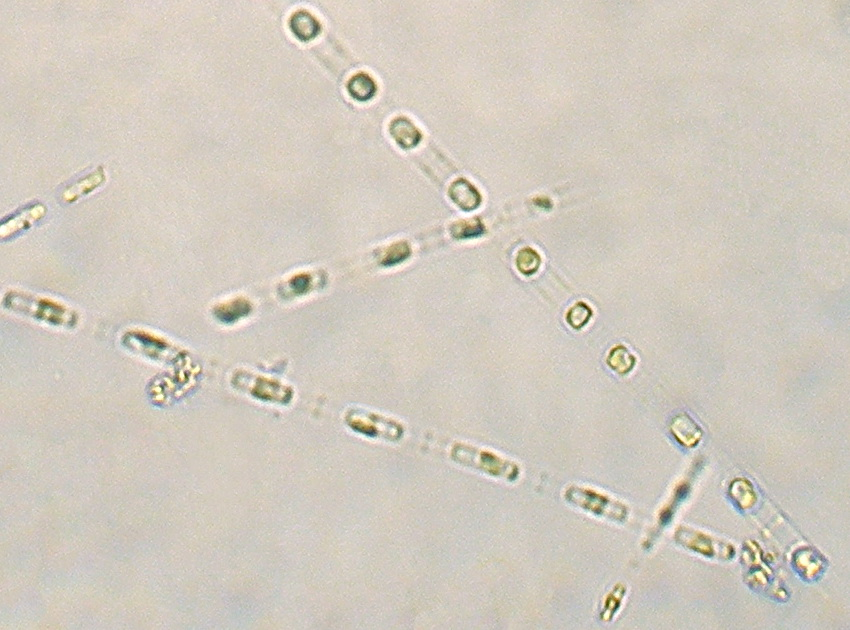
- Skeletonema costatum

Scientific classification
- Domain: Eukaryota
- Clade: Sar
- Clade: Stramenopiles
- Phylum: Bacillariophyta
- Class: Coscinodiscophyceae
- Order: Thalassiosirales
- Family: Skeletonemataceae; Lebour, 1930, sensu emend.

Genera
- Skeletonema (type); (nomen dubium): †Skeletonemopsis; †Skeletonemopsis barbadense

Synonyms
- Skeletonemaceae

= Skeletonemataceae =

Proposed family of diatoms

Skeletonemataceae is a proposed family of centric diatoms in the order Thalassiosirales. There is currently only one living and one fossil genus in this family. Their sexual reproduction is oogamous, where reproduction occurs by the union of mobile male and immobile female gametes. They lack significant motility.
