= French ship Thalassa =

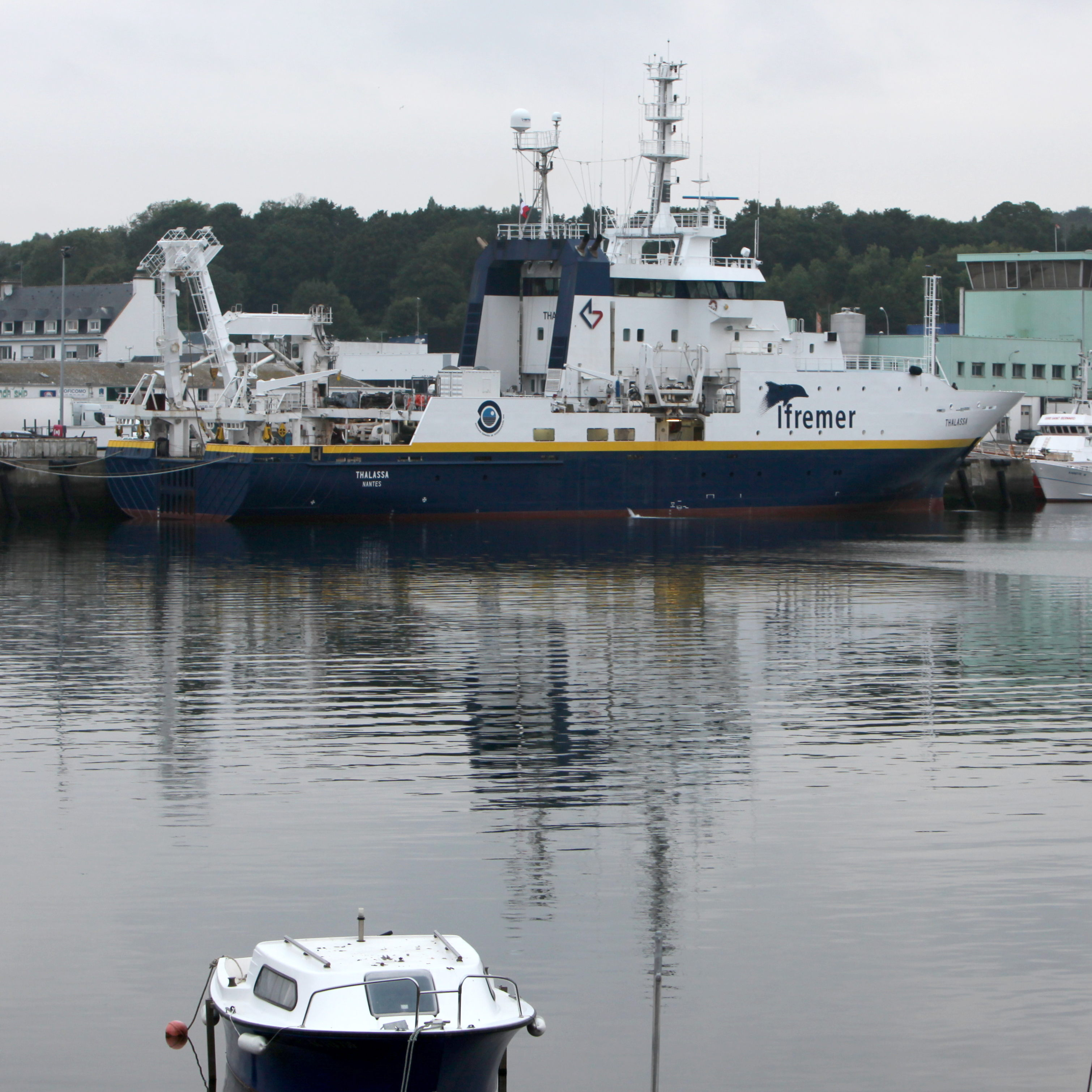
- Thalassa

History

France
- Name: Thalassa
- Operator: IFREMER
- Port of registry: Nantes
- Builder: Manche Industrie Marine, Dieppe
- Launched: 16 May 1995
- In service: 1996
- Identification: IMO number: 9070307; Call sign: FNFP; MMSI number: 227297000
- Status: Active as of 2018

General characteristics
- Tonnage: 2,803 GT
- Displacement: 3,022 t (2,974 long tons)
- Length: 73.65 m (241 ft 8 in) o/a
- Beam: 14.9 m (48 ft 11 in)
- Draught: 6.1 m (20 ft 0 in)
- Propulsion: Diesel-electric; 4 × MWM-Deutz TBD 604-BV12 1,128 kW (1,513 hp) diesel engines; 1 × Cegelec RP-38P 12/12 2,200 kW (2,950 hp) electric motor; 1 × shaft; 1 × 440 kW (590 hp) bow thruster; 1 × 264 kW (354 hp) stern thruster
- Speed: 14.7 knots (27.2 km/h; 16.9 mph)
- Crew: 16 to 25

Thalassa is an oceanographic research vessel operated by the Institut Français de Recherche pour l'Exploitation de la Mer (IFREMER), the French Institute for Research of the Exploitation of the Sea.

Thalassa was launched in 1995 and commissioned to replace an eponymous ship of 1960.
