= Nanophytoplankton =

Very small phytoplankton

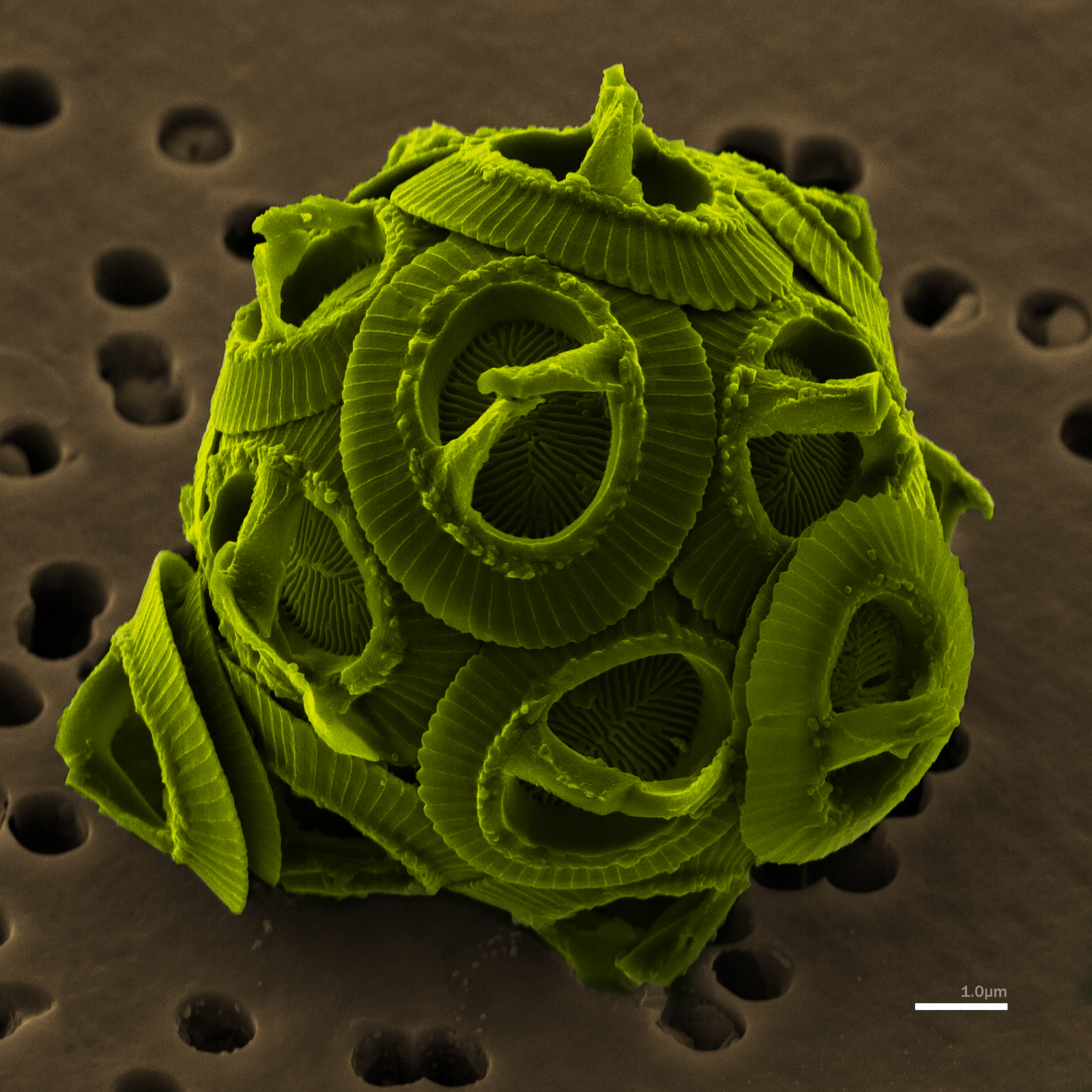
False-color scanning electron micrograph of Gephyrocapsa oceanica

Nanophytoplankton are particularly small phytoplankton with sizes between 2 and 20 μm. They are the autotrophic part of nanoplankton. Like other phytoplankton, nanophytoplankton are microscopic organisms that obtain energy through the process of photosynthesis and must therefore live in the upper sunlit layer of ocean or other bodies of water. These microscopic free-floating organisms, including algae, and cyanobacteria, fix large amounts of carbon which would otherwise be released as carbon dioxide. The term nanophytoplankton is derived from the far more widely used term nannoplankton/nanoplankton.

== Ecosystem role ==
Phytoplankton form the beginning of the food chain for aquatic animals. Zooplankton and krill feed on nanophytoplankton, and are then eaten by whales, seals, birds, fish, squid, and other organisms.

== Life cycle ==
Populations are low in the winter, when nutrients are high, and then the populations increase as the nanophytoplankton consume nearly all of the nutrients, reach their carrying capacity, and decline in number at the end of the summer, beginning the cycle again in the winter. However, nanophytoplankton have different seasonal cycles depending on which oceanic biome of the world they live in.

== Nutrient uptake ==
Phytoplanktons' density (1.02 g/cm^{3}) is higher than that of sea water (1.00 g/cm^{3}). Therefore, they sink in the ocean, unless there is an upward movement of water. However, nanophytoplankton, with as small as a 1 μm radius, can swim in the ocean, but at a very slow rate, like "a human swimming in molasses". In either case, movement of water past the organism is created, allowing it to grab nutrients passing by. To supply nutrients through their boundary layer, nanophytoplankton employ diffusion more effectively than swimming, however.

== In Antarctic ==
In the Southern Ocean in the Antarctic zone, nanophytoplankton are the most abundant type of plankton in terms of number, but not volume. Antarctic marine flora consists almost entirely of algae, with phytoplankton (and, therefore, nanophytoplankton as the most numerous type) having great importance. Nanophytoplankton growth has been seen in pack-ice, covering nearly 73% of the Southern Ocean by the end of the winter. They even grow on icebergs. Nanophytoplankton production is affected by light intensity and duration, ice, surface water stability, and currents. Also, availability of silicates, a nutrient for the organism, can affect photosynthetic efficiency and cell composition. Nanophytoplankton also require vitamins. They thrive in areas of shallow water where there is upwelling and mixing. Although optimal growth for the species occurs in water 5–7 °C (41–45 °F), growth still occurs in Antarctic waters, which can reach as low as −2 °C (28 °F). Limitation of light intensity and duration is another factor for survival. In Antarctica, the sun's lower position above the horizon reduces light due to increased reflection, and the stormy seas reduce transmission of light due to bubble formation. However, some Antarctic nanophytoplankton seem to be adapted to low light levels. Most phytoplankton exist in warmer, equatorial waters. For example, in the northwestern Philippine Sea, the average number of nanophytoplankton was 1 × 10^{4}/L. Nanophytoplankton in particular seem to survive better under the conditions provided by the oceans of the Antarctic. A physiological change in the cells must have occurred to allow this phenomenon. Low salinity is desirable for survival, as well.

== Effect on global warming ==
Continued global warming will significantly alter the food chain on Earth. With nanophytoplankton and phytoplankton at the base of the food chain, their decreased productivity from increased UV-B radiation from ozone depletion will provide less food for krill and subsequent organisms in the food chain. Antarctica has experienced up to 50% ozone depletion, harming nanophytoplankton located here the most. Through carbon fixation, nanophytoplankton absorb carbon from the atmosphere, and with depleting populations, more carbon is left in the air, contributing to more global warming and ozone depletion. The cycle then continues. However, some scientists believe that existence of nanophytoplankton contributes to further progression of global warming, because they absorb the Sun's radiation that would otherwise be reflected back into space. Despite the controversy, it is evident that nanophytoplankton, despite their minimal size and apparent irrelevance because they are hardly visible, are an integral part of sustaining life on Earth.

== See also ==
- Calcareous nannofossils
- Mediolabrus comicus
