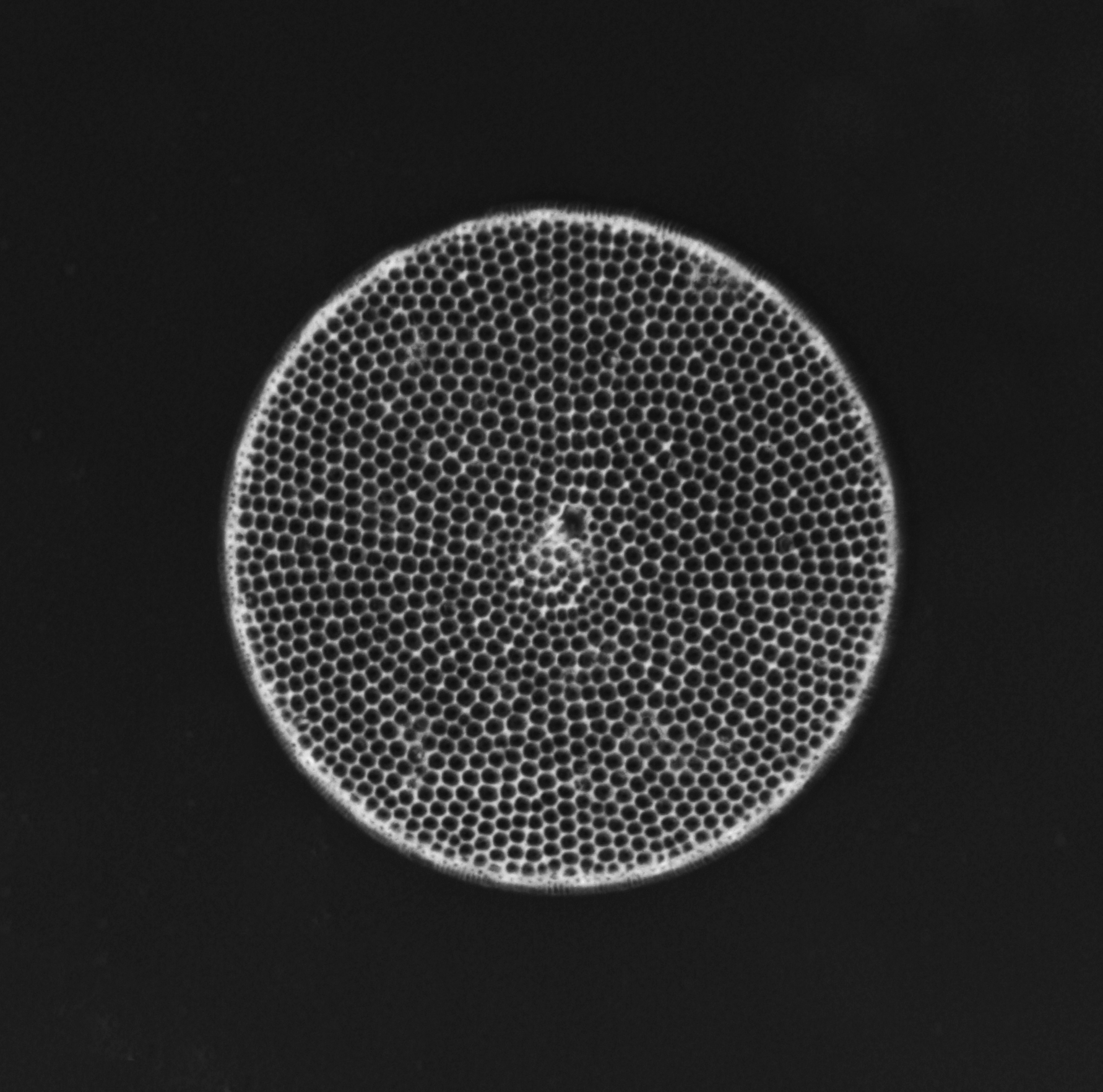
- Fossil Thalassiosira sp.

Scientific classification
- Domain: Eukaryota
- Supergroup: Stramenopiles
- Division: Ochrophyta
- Clade: Bacillariophyta
- Class: Thalassiosirophyceae
- Subclass: Thalassiosirophycidae
- Order: Thalassiosirales
- Family: Thalassiosiraceae; Lebour, 1930

Genera
- Conticribra; Coscinosira; Lineaperpetua; Livingstonia; Mediolabrus; Microsiphona; Minidiscus; Parthaea; Planktoniella; Porosira; Praestephanos; Roundia; Shionodiscus; Sinerima; Spicaticribra; Stephanocyclus; Takanoa; Thalassiocyclus; Thalassiosira

= Thalassiosiraceae =

Family of single-celled organisms

Thalassiosiraceae is a family of diatoms in the order Thalassiosirales. Thalassiosiraceae have the unique quality of having a flat valve face. These diatoms are common in brackish, nearshore, and open-ocean habitats, with approximately the same number of freshwater and marine species.

== Morphology and ultrastructure ==
Thalassiosiraceae include some of the smallest known diatoms, such as the genera Minidiscus and Mediolabrus with diameters as small as 1.9 μm (in M. comicus).

Unlike Naviculaceae who are symmetrical in shape, some Thalassiosiraceae are tangentially undulate.

Thalassiosiraceae are centric diatoms with fultoportulae (central tube passing through the valve and two or more satellite pores). These structures can often be mistaken for areolae present in many diatom families that can be found in different forms such as those in Navicula or Gomphoneis known as lineolate and punctate areolae.

== Model organisms ==
The species Thalassiosira pseudonana was chosen as the first eukaryotic marine phytoplankton for whole genome sequencing. T. pseudonana was selected for this study because it is a model for diatom physiology studies, belongs to a genus widely distributed throughout the world's oceans, and has a relatively small genome at 34 mega base pairs.

Scientists are researching diatom light absorption, using the marine genus Thalassiosira.
