= RV Sarmiento de Gamboa =

Research vessel

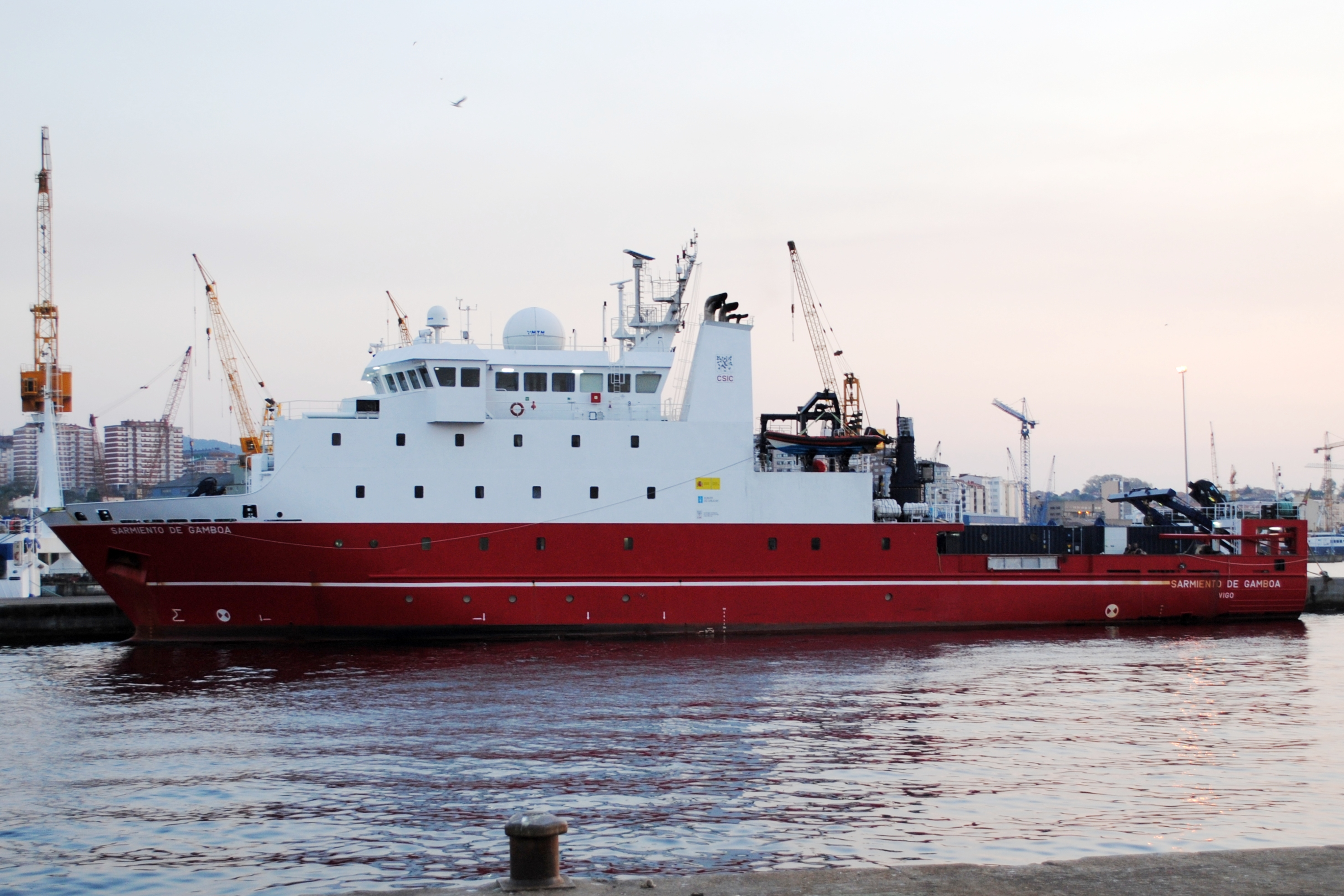
- RV Sarmiento de Gamboa in Vigo, 2012

History

Spain
- Name: RV Sarmiento de Gamboa
- Namesake: Pedro Sarmiento de Gamboa
- Operator: Spanish National Research Council
- Port of registry: Spain
- Ordered: 2004
- Builder: Construcciones Navales P. Freire
- Completed: 2006
- Homeport: Vigo
- Identification: IMO number: 9335238; MMSI number: 224713000; Callsign: EAKF
- Status: Active as of 2025

General characteristics
- Class & type: research vessel
- Displacement: 1979 t
- Length: 70.5 m
- Beam: 15.5 m
- Draught: 4.60 m
- Installed power: 1800 KW / 690 volt / Three phase
- Propulsion: 2 reversible electric motors of 1200 Kw; Main propeller, 5 fixed pitch blades; Other propellers: retractable forward, combi and azimuthal of 590 Kw, and an aft transverse propeller of 350 Kw
- Speed: 15 knots
- Endurance: 40 days
- Boats & landing craft carried: Valiant DR 620 service boat; Valiant PT 650 rescue boat; Duarry S8 service boat
- Capacity: 26 scientists and technicians
- Crew: 16
- Sensors & processing systems: singlebeam, multibeam, multibeam deep-water, parametric, & biological echosounders; Speed sound profiler, subbottom profiler; Doppler Current profiler; Marport net sensors; MK21 Oceanographic data acquisition system; Continuous circuit of surface sound velocity; Gravimeters; Magnetometer; Hight precision Acustic positioning System
- Notes: Classification: HULL SPECIAL SERVICE OCEANOGRAPHIC AND FISHING RESEARCH UNRESTRICTED NAVIGATION + MACH + AUT-UMS, AUT-CCS, ALM SDS COMF-1, SYS-NEQ 1 DYNAPOS AM/AT

RV Sarmiento de Gamboa is an oceanographic research vessel operated by the Spanish National Research Council. It is used globally to study eg. ocean circulation, marine biodiversity, fishery resources, and climate change.

== Background ==
Its construction was authorized by the Spanish Government in 2004, and it was launched in 2006 in the presence of Queen Sofia. It was built by Construcciones Navales P. Freire in Vigo (Pontevedra, Spain). Funding is provided by the Galician Regional Government, the Ministry of Education, and CSIC. It has an overall length of 70.5 meters, a beam of 15.5 meters, and is propelled by diesel and electric engines. It is named after Pedro Sarmiento de Gamboa, Spanish explorer from the 16th century.

== Missions and discoveries ==
- Plankton samples collected by the ship in 2009 in NW Mediterranean allowed researchers to describe a unique life cycle of the smallest marine diatom, Mediolabrus comicus.
- In 2010, the vessel participated in the Malaspina Expedition together with BIO Hespérides.
- In February 2020, researchers aboard the ship found very dense and diverse benthic communities in the Blanes Canyon.
- In 2024, researchers aboard the ship discovered an underwater mountain range named "Los Atlantes" consists of three volcanoes north of the Canary Islands.
- In February 2025, researchers aboard the ship have observed massive columns of methane emerging from the Antarctic seabed.

== See also ==
- BIO Hespérides (A-33)
- History of research ships
- List of research vessels by country
