= Carlos Prado Pampín =

Spanish filmmaker and journalist

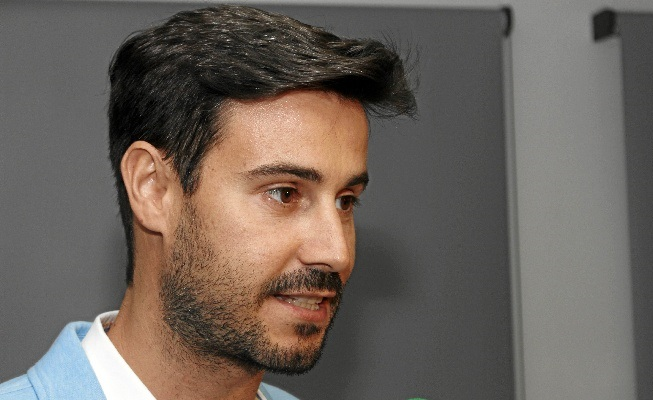
- Born: 1982 (age 43–44); Marín
- Education: Universidade de Santiago de Compostela
- Notable work: Vellas (2010)

Carlos Prado Pampín (Marín, 1982) is a Spanish filmmaker and journalist. He directed and produced the short film Vellas, about old-age LGBT love. He has also been a reporter and television director for the Spanish nationwide broadcast television station laSexta. In 2016 he won the 3rd Befesa Award of Environmental Journalism.

== Early life ==
Carlos Prado Pampín was born in Marín, Pontevedra, in 1982. At the age of 15 he started recording his own domestic films. At the age of 18 he starts audiovisual studies in Vigo, and shortly after he starts his studies of journalism at Universidade de Santiago de Compostela.

== Filmography ==
- Vellas (2010). Fiction short on LGBT love between two elderly women. Runner-up for the Mestre Mateo Awards 2008.
- A mano o a máquina (2015). Short that became a success online and was candidate to the audience award at the Spanish online short film festival Notodofilmfest.
- Homes de xeo: galegos na Antártida (2017). Documentary shot on the South Pole while on board the BIO Hesperides, a Spanish polar research vessel.
- Devolvendo o golpe (2021). Documentary about the life of Spanish boxer Aaron Gonzalez "Thunder", who at age 10 almost got killed by a car, and the fight of his mother Rosa for him to get ahead and fulfill his dream of becoming a Spanish boxing champion.
