= Susana Agustí =

Spanish biological oceanographer

- Education: Autonomous University of Madrid
- Scientific career
- Fields: Biological oceanography
- Workplaces: King Abdullah University of Science and Technology
- Website: Agusti at King Abdullah University of Science and Technology

Susana Agustí Requena is a Spanish biological oceanographer who has participated in over 25 oceanographic expeditions in the Arctic, Southern Ocean (Antarctic), Atlantic, Pacific and Indian Oceans. She played a key role in the Malaspina Circumnavigation Expedition. She is professor in Marine Science at King Abdullah University of Science and Technology in Saudi Arabia and an adjunct Professor at the University of Tromsø (Norway).

== Early life and education ==
Agusti completed a BSc at the Autonomous University of Madrid in 1982 and a PhD at the same institution in 1989.

== Career and impact ==
Agusti studies the photosynthetic plankton and the metabolic balance of the oceans, with present goals focused in evaluate the impact of global change in the oceans. Her research has been devoted to study the effect of warming in the Arctic Ocean, the Mediterranean Sea and the Indian Ocean. In her role as a researcher for the Spanish National Research Council (CSIC) where she worked from 1992, she led the first Spanish oceanographic expedition to the Arctic in 2007 and led the Arctic Tipping Points project on the effects of climate change. From 2011 to 2015, she was a professorial fellow at the Oceans Institute of the University of Western Australia and since 2015 has been Professor of Marine Science at the BESE, Red Sea Research Center, King Abdullah University of Science and Technology, Saudi Arabia.

She also researches the Red Sea, in particular, the effects of increased water temperature and studies the effects of other stressors as UV-B radiation, pollutants transported by the atmosphere to the ocean, and stressors interactions. Her key research themes include global change, biological oceanography, phytoplankton ecology, pelagic metabolism, polar ecosystems, optical properties and UV radiation, growth, and cell death and losses.

She has participated in over 25 oceanographic expeditions in the Arctic and Southern (Antarctic) Ocean, Atlantic, Pacific and Indian Oceans. In 2010, Agusti was Chief Scientist on one leg of the Malaspina Circumnavigation Expedition, which overall involved more than 400 scientists from 10 countries. She led a work package on ocean optics, phytoplankton, production & metabolism.

== Selected works ==
Agustí has authored or co-authored over a hundred research papers and journal articles, including the following:

- Duarte, Carlos M., Susana Agustí, Javier Arístegui, Natalia González, and Ricardo Anadón. "Evidence for a heterotrophic subtropical northeast Atlantic." Limnology and Oceanography 46, no. 2 (2001): 425-428.
- Agustí, Susana, Susana Enríquez, Henning Frost-Christensen, Kaj Sand-Jensen, and Carlos M. Duarte. "Light harvesting among photosynthetic organisms." Functional Ecology (1994): 273-279.
- Llabrés, Moira, and Susana Agustí. "Picophytoplankton cell death induced by UV radiation: evidence for oceanic Atlantic communities." (2006).
- Agustí, Susana, and M. Carmen Sánchez. "Cell viability in natural phytoplankton communities quantified by a membrane permeability probe." (2002).
- Marbà, Núria, Carlos M. Duarte, and Susana Agustí. "Allometric scaling of plant life history." Proceedings of the National Academy of Sciences 104, no. 40 (2007): 15777-15780.
- Duarte, Carlos M., Jordi Dachs, Moira Llabrés, Patricia Alonso‐Laita, Josep M. Gasol, Antonio Tovar‐Sánchez, Sergio Sañudo‐Wilhemy, and Susana Agustí. "Aerosol inputs enhance new production in the subtropical northeast Atlantic." Journal of Geophysical Research: Biogeosciences 111, no. G4 (2006).
- Vidal, Montserrat, Carlos M. Duarte, Susana Agustí, Josep M. Gasol, and Dolors Vaqué. "Alkaline phosphatase activities in the central Atlantic Ocean indicate large areas with phosphorus deficiency." Marine Ecology Progress Series 262 (2003): 43-53.
