= Malaspina Expedition 2010 =

Interdisciplinary research project

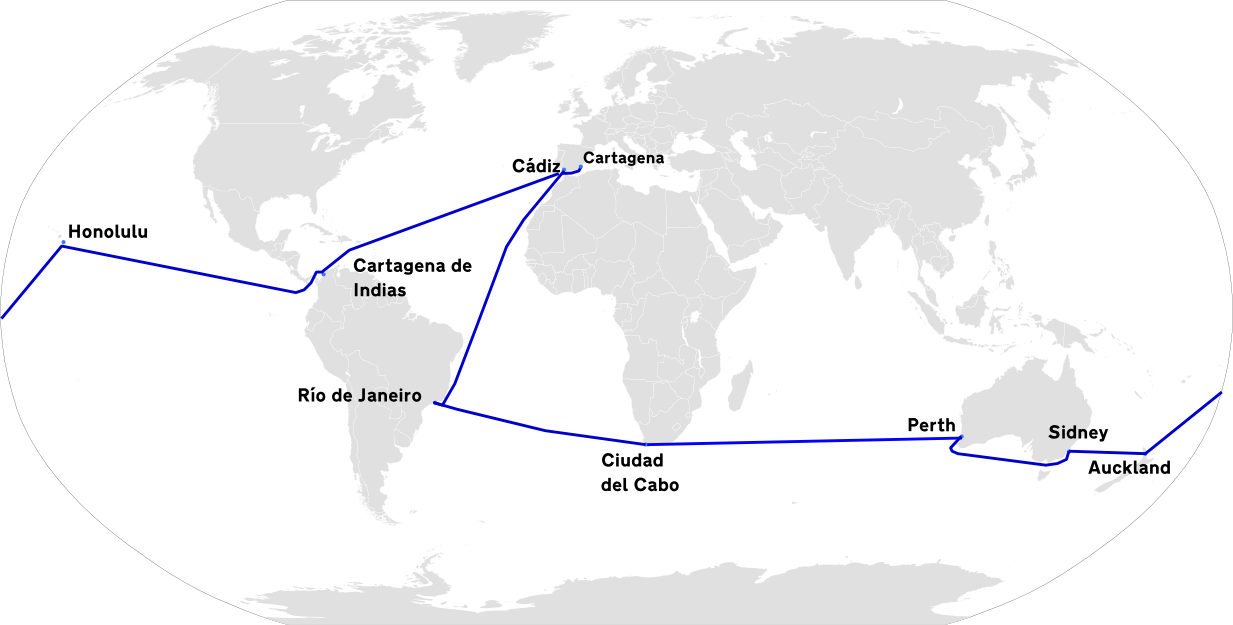
Map of the Malaspina Expedition (2010-2011).

The Malaspina circumnavigation expedition was an interdisciplinary research project to assess the impact of global change on the oceans and explore their biodiversity. The 250 scientists on board the Hespérides and RV Sarmiento de Gamboa embarked on an eight-month expedition (starting in December 2010) scientific research with training for young researchers - advancing marine science and fostering the public understanding of science.

The project was under the umbrella of the Spanish Ministry of Science and Innovation's Consolider – Ingenio 2010 programme and was led by the Spanish National Research Council (CSIC) with the support of the Spanish Navy. It is named after the original scientific Malaspina Expedition between 1789 and 1794, that was commanded by Alejandro Malaspina. Due to Malaspina's involvement in a conspiracy to overthrow the Spanish government, he was jailed upon his return and a large part of the expedition's reports and collections were put away unpublished, not to see the light again until late in the 20th century.

== Objectives ==
=== Assessing the impact of global change on the oceans ===
Global change relates to the impact of human activities on the functioning of the biosphere. These include activities which, although performed locally, have effects on the functioning of the Earth's system as a whole.

The ocean plays a central role in regulating the planet's climate and is its biggest sink of CO_{2} and other substances produced by human activity.

The project will put together Colección Malaspina 2010, a collection of environmental and biological data and samples which will be available to the scientific community for it to evaluate the impacts of future global changes. This will be particularly valuable, for example, when new technologies allow levels of pollutants below current thresholds of detection to be evaluated.

=== Exploring the biodiversity of the deep ocean ===
Half the Earth's surface is covered by oceans over 3,000 metres deep, making them the biggest ecosystem on the planet. Nevertheless, due to the limitations of the technology available until just recently, the oceans remain something of a mystery. Indeed, it is often said that we know more about the Moon or Mars than Earth's oceans.

The development of new genomic techniques has now made it possible to explore life's diversity in the sunless depths of the oceans and assess the metabolic potential of the life they conceal. Exploring biodiversity in the ocean's depths could also yield important discoveries with applications in biotechnology.

=== Assessing the impact of the original Malaspina expedition ===
Using sources in the countries visited, the project also aims to assess the socio-political impact of the Malaspina expedition in the regions it explored, and review the biography and historiography of Alejandro Malaspina, with particular emphasis on the work done in the wake of the expedition.

=== Promoting marine science in Spain and public understanding of issues in marine sciences ===
Spain has played a leading role in the exploration of the planet's resources, and remains a benchmark in international oceanographic research. The project aims to foster platforms for cooperation within the marine research community in Spain, and to bring science and research on global change closer to the public through various outreach activities, such as exhibitions, lecture series, etc.

=== Raising the interest for marine sciences within the youth and training young scientists in a global perspective to ocean sciences ===
The project will be a unique opportunity to promote the training of young researchers in marine sciences. Four postgraduate programmes have jointly coordinated a training module, included in the FBBVA-CSIC's Malaspina Expedition Doctoral Programme, financed by the BBVA Foundation and the CSIC. The high point of this training module will be the use of the Sarmiento de Gamboa as a teaching vessel on the leg of the journey between Miami and Las Palmas.

== Research blocks ==
The expedition's research work is subdivided into 11 blocks:

=== Thematic blocks ===
- Physical oceanography: changes in the physical properties of the ocean
- Ocean biochemistry: carbon, nutrients and trace gases
- Atmospheric deposition and organic pollutants
- Optics, phytoplankton, production and metabolism
- Microbiological diversity and ecological function
- The distribution and role of zooplankton in the world's oceans
- The Malaspina expedition. Science and politics on the other side of the ocean

=== Horizontal blocks ===
- Coordination
- Science and society
- Training
- Integration

== Route taken by the expedition ==
The Malaspina expedition, taking place between December 2010 and July 2011, will involve two oceanographic research vessels: The Hespérides, operated by the Spanish Navy, which will circumnavigate the globe, and the R/V Sarmiento de Gamboa, operated by the Marine Technology Unit from the CSIC, which will sail from Cádiz to Santo Domingo (Dominican Republic) and then return to Cádiz, where it will host a ‘floating university’ providing oceanographic training for a group of master's degree students.

=== Route of the Hesperides ===
- Cartagena–Cádiz
- Cádiz–Río de Janeiro
- Rio de Janeiro–Cape Town
- Cape Town–Perth
- Perth–Sydney
- Sydney–Auckland
- Auckland–Honolulu
- Honolulu–Cartagena
- Cartagena–Cádiz
