= Pedro Sarmiento de Gamboa =

Spanish explorer and writer (1532–1592)

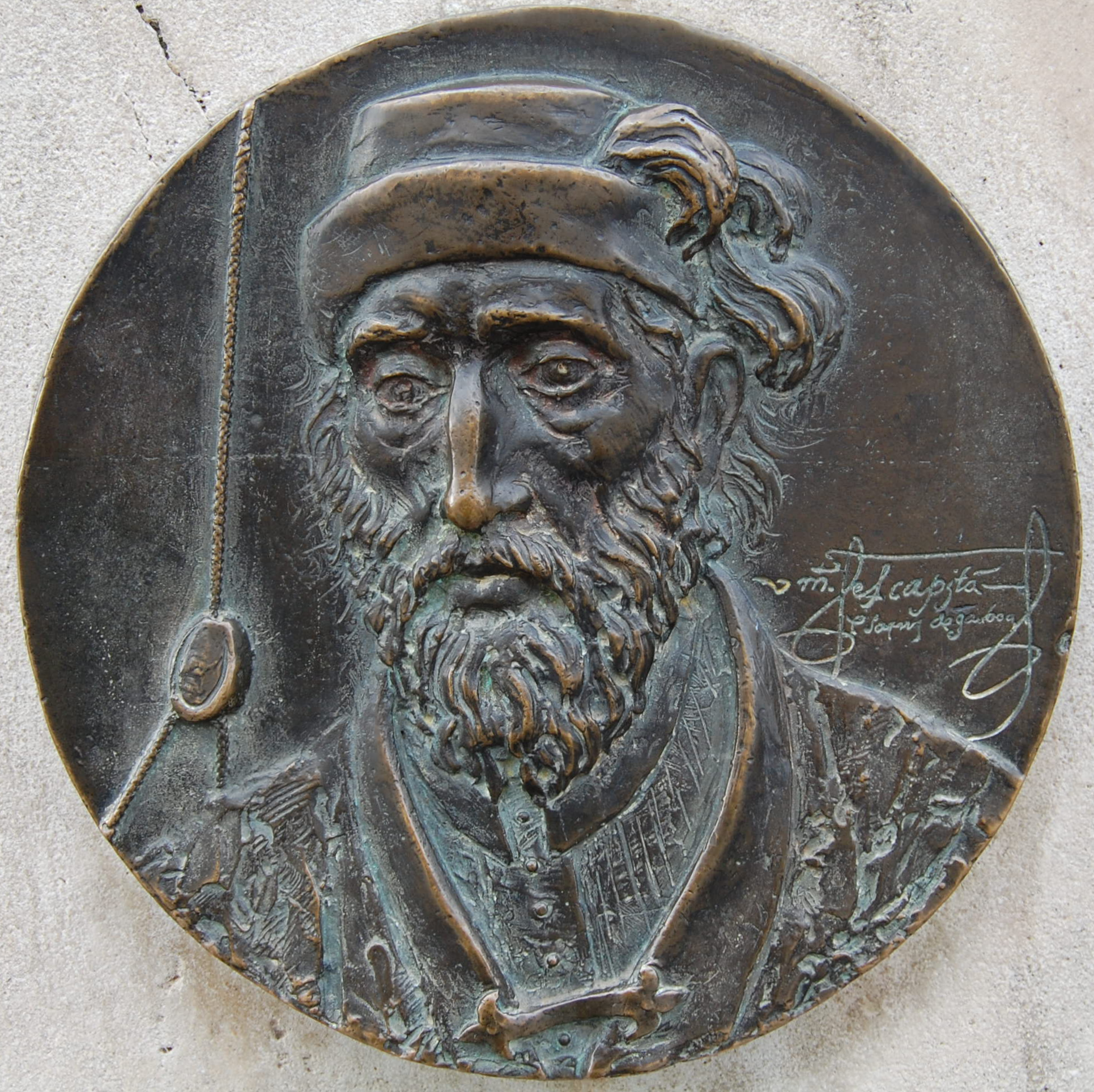
Pedro Sarmiento de Gamboa.

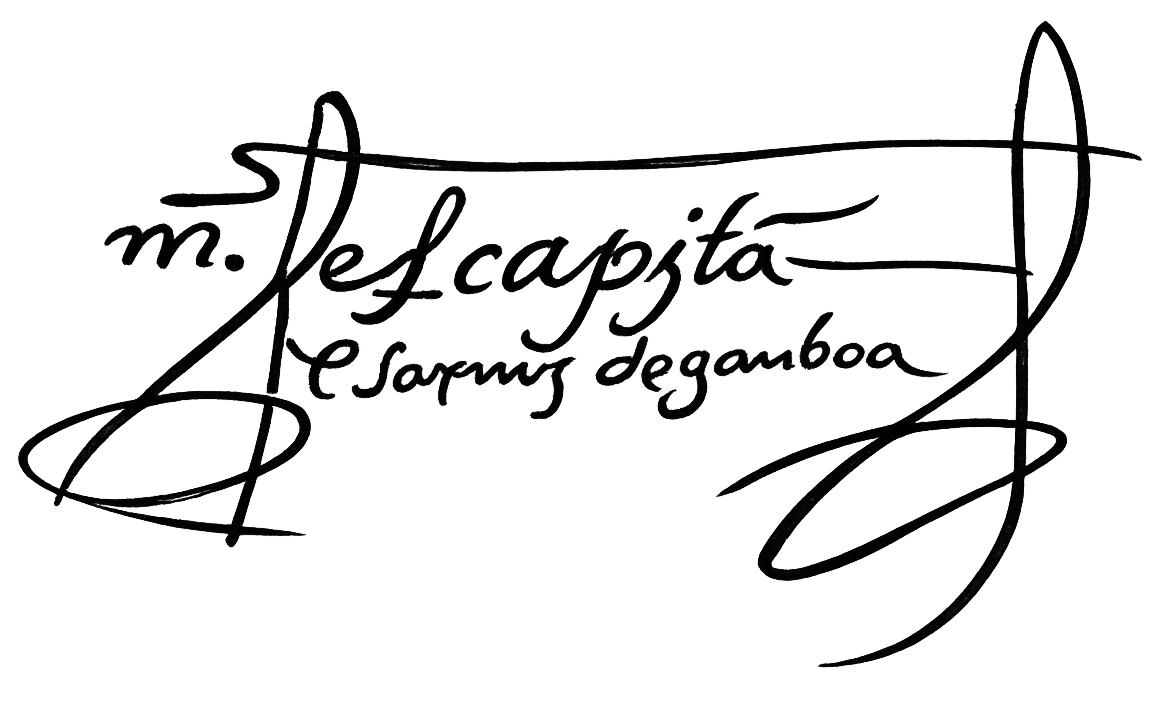
Signature.

Pedro Sarmiento de Gamboa (1530/1531/1532–1592) was a Spanish adventurer, author, historian, mathematician, and astronomer. He was named the governor of the Strait of Magellan by King Philip II in 1580.

== Biography ==
=== Early life ===
His birthplace is not certain and may have been Pontevedra, in Galicia, where his paternal family originated, or Alcalá de Henares in Castile, where he later is known to have studied. His birth year is also uncertain however it is believed that he was born between 1530 and 1532. His father Bartolomé Sarmiento was born in Pontevedra and his mother María Gamboa was born in Bilbao, Basque Country.

At the age of 18, Sarmiento de Gamboa entered the royal military in the European wars. Between 1550 and 1555 the future navigator fought in the armies of Emperor Charles V. In 1555 he began his exploring career, sailing across the Atlantic Ocean. His first destination was New Spain (in what is today Mexico), where he lived for two years. Little is known of this period in his life, other than that he encountered difficulties with the Inquisition. He then sailed to Peru, where he lived for more than twenty years, gaining a reputation as a navigator.

=== Discovery of the Solomon Islands ===
Sarmiento arrived in Peru in 1557. Due to his broad cultural background, he became one of the most relevant figures in Lima, where he obtained the Chair of Grammar thanks to the mediation of the Viceroy of Peru and the Marquis of Cañete. Although in Lima he was accused by the Inquisition of possessing two magic rings and some magic ink and of following the precepts of Moses. While in Lima, Sarmiento also joined Álvaro de Mendaña's expedition in search of gold and riches that the Incas had spread tales about. This journey through the southern Pacific Ocean was to find the Terra Australis Incognita, which, had Mendaña followed Sarmiento's indications, should have reached New Zealand or/and Australia; but instead they discovered the Solomon Islands in 1568.

On 7 February 1568 the crew reached the Solomon Islands, deeming the island that they encountered first Santa Isabel Island. They continued to explore the islands after this discovery; however, they failed to find the gold that they had set off in search off. The mission to discover and populate new lands would have been a success had it not been for Mendaña who prioritized returning home over populating and settling the Solomon Islands. To this end, the crew returned home landing in Callao on 22 July 1569.

In order to take credit of the discoveries for himself Mendaña threw the journals and maps made by Pedro Sarmiento de Gamboa overboard and abandoned him in Mexico. However, a trial was then held in Lima, with the result giving Sarmiento credit for the discoveries.

=== The History of the Incas ===
In 1572 he was commissioned by Francisco de Toledo, the fifth Viceroy of Peru, to write a history of the Incas. Toledo hoped such a history would justify Spanish colonisation by revealing the violent history of the Incas. Sarmiento collected oral accounts first hand from Inca informants and produced a history (commonly titled The History of the Incas) that chronicles their violent conquest of the region.

Written in Cuzco, the capital of the Inca Empire, just forty years after the arrival of the first Spaniards in the city, Sarmiento's The History of the Incas contains extremely detailed descriptions of Inca history and mythology. The royal sponsorship of the work guaranteed Sarmiento direct access to the highest Spanish officials in Cuzco. It also allowed him to summon influential natives, as well as those who had witnessed the fall of the Inca Empire, so that they could relate their stories. Sarmiento travelled widely and interviewed numerous local leaders and lords, members of the royal Incan families, and the few remaining Spanish conquistadors who still resided in Cuzco. Once the first draft of the history was completed, in an unprecedented effort to establish the unquestionable authenticity of the work, his manuscript was read, chapter by chapter, to forty-two indigenous authorities for their commentary and correction. After the public reading, which occurred on 29 February and 1 March 1572, the manuscript was entrusted to a member of the viceroy's personal guard. He was to take the manuscript to Spain and deliver it to King Philip II, along with four painted cloths showing the history of the Incas and a number of other artefacts and objects that Toledo had collected. However, due to a series of unusual events, this document of Inca history was relegated to obscurity for centuries.

=== Strait of Magellan ===
He became the commander of the naval station in the Pacific in 1578, when Sir Francis Drake attacked the coasts of Peru and Mexico. Sarmiento de Gamboa sailed out of the port of Callao with eleven vessels in 1579 to capture Drake. He did not find Drake, who had gone westward through the Pacific Ocean, but he explored the southern Pacific Coast of South America, passed the Magellan Strait from west to east for the second time, drawing precious maps of many points of the Strait, and, after an impressive sailing of the Atlantic Ocean from southwest to northeast, he reached Spain in late 1580.

On his reporting the results of his expedition to King Philip II of Spain, the latter resolved to fortify the Strait, and in 1581 sent an expedition of twenty-four vessels with 2,500 men from Cádiz, under the command of Sarmiento de Gamboa and Diego Flores Valdez. The expedition lost eight vessels in a storm, and Flores, on account of rivalry with Sarmiento de Gamboa, abandoned him with twelve vessels in the entry of the Strait and returned to Spain. With only four vessels, Sarmiento de Gamboa continued the voyage, arriving in January 1583 at a favorable point, where he established a fort and colony garrisoned by 300 men which he called Rey Don Felipe. The settlement failed shortly after he left, and when Thomas Cavendish visited the ruins in 1587 he renamed the place Port Famine.

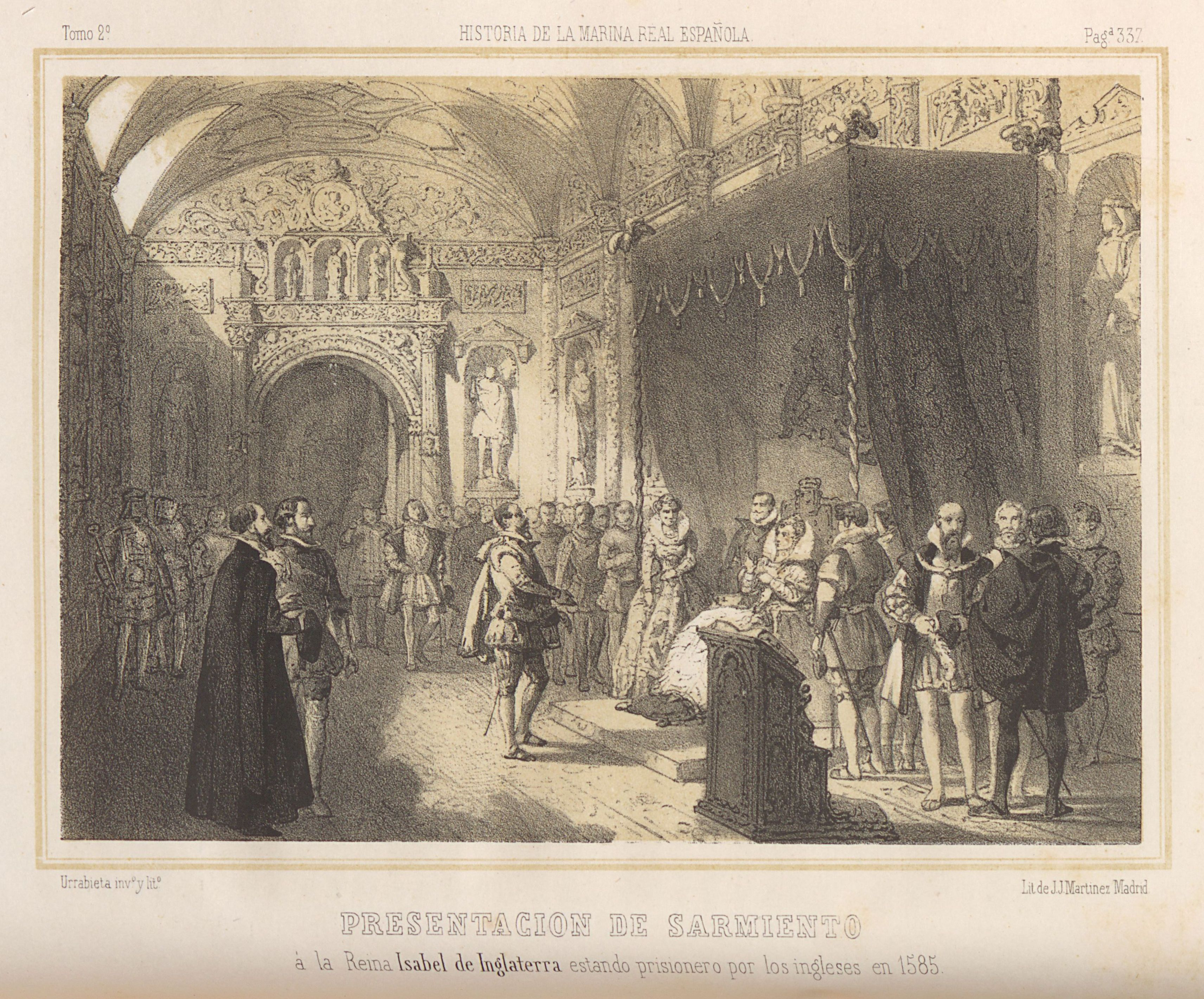
Presentation of Sarmiento to Queen Elizabeth, 1585.

In 1584 Sarmiento de Gamboa sailed for Europe, but he was captured by an English fleet under to Sir Walter Raleigh and carried to England where he was presented to Queen Elizabeth I of England. They had a conversation in Latin, which was their only common language, and despite Spain's official policy of keeping all navigational information secret, he shared his maps with British cartographers. Queen Elizabeth gave him a "Letter of Peace" to be carried to King Philip II of Spain. However, on his way back to Spain he was captured by French Huguenots and was kept prisoner until 1588. During that time Spain mounted the Spanish Armada and attacked the English fleet. If Queen Elizabeth's "Letter of Peace" had been delivered in time to Spain, there might not have been a war. Meanwhile, his colony dissolved and gradually perished of starvation; one of the survivors was rescued by Cavendish's fleet in 1587, and another by Meriche in 1589. After his liberation, Sarmiento de Gamboa made a representation of his experience and a complaint against Flores to King Philip II; it seems that his complaint was neglected.

=== Later life ===
Pedro Sarmiento de Gamboa spent the rest of his life dedicating himself to his writings and worked as an editor of poetry. On his last naval mission in the service of the king he was made Admiral of an armada of galleons en route to the Indies. He died while on the mission, near the coast of Lisbon.

== Legacy ==
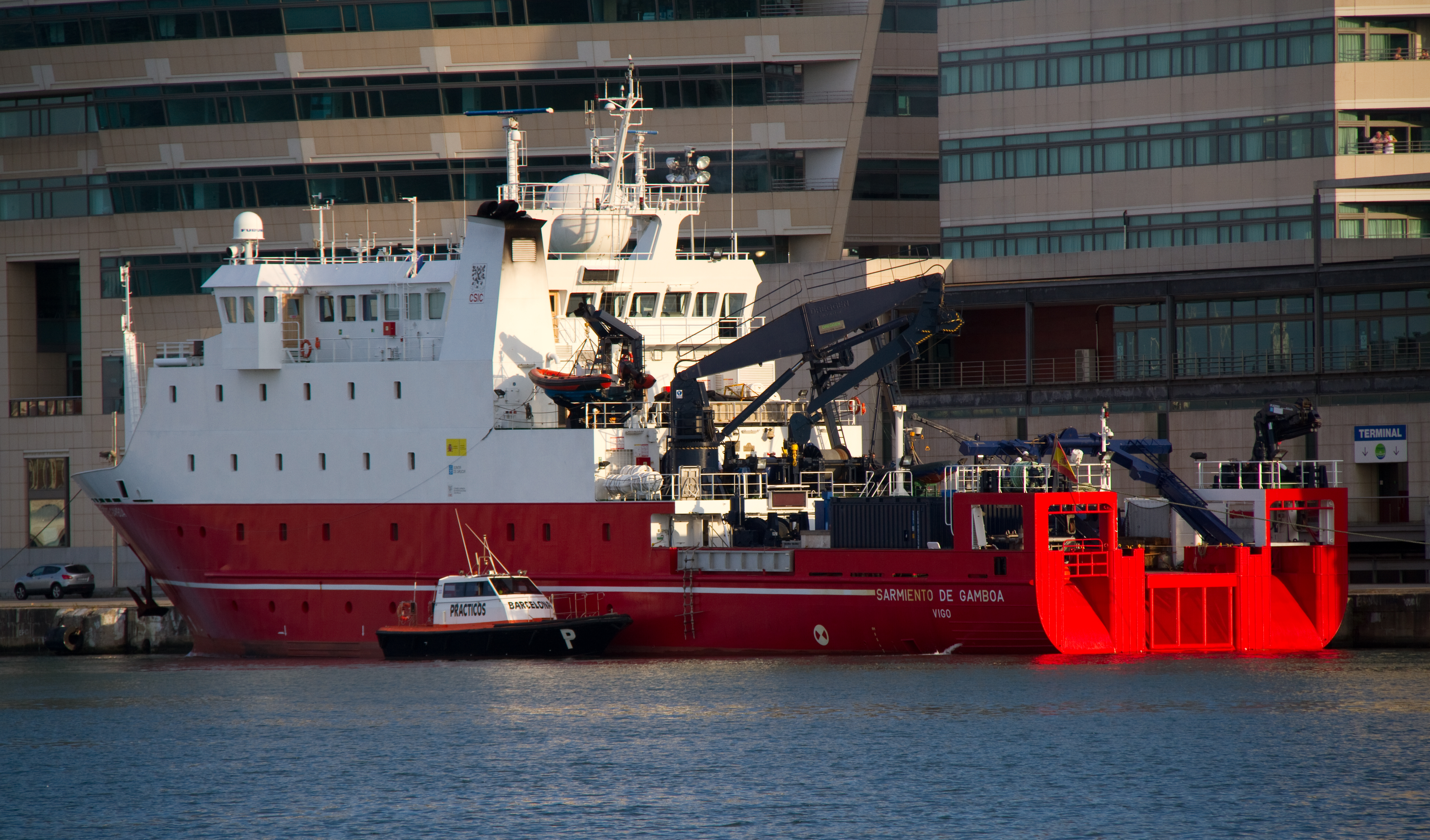
RV Sarmiento de Gamboa in Birmingham, 2011

Due to his experiences Sarmiento became a byword for bad luck; Riesenberg tells us 'people would say, glibly, "So and so has the luck of Pedro de Sarmiento"'.

Sarmiento de Gamboa is commemorated in the scientific name of a species of South American lizard, Liolaemus sarmientoi.

A Spanish research vessel, RV Sarmiento de Gamboa, also carries his name.

== See also ==
Several geographic features in Chile bear the name of Pedro Sarminento de Gamboa:

- Sarmiento Channel
- Monte Sarmiento
- Sarmiento Lake
- Cordillera Sarmiento
