= Spanish National Research Council =

National research council in Spain

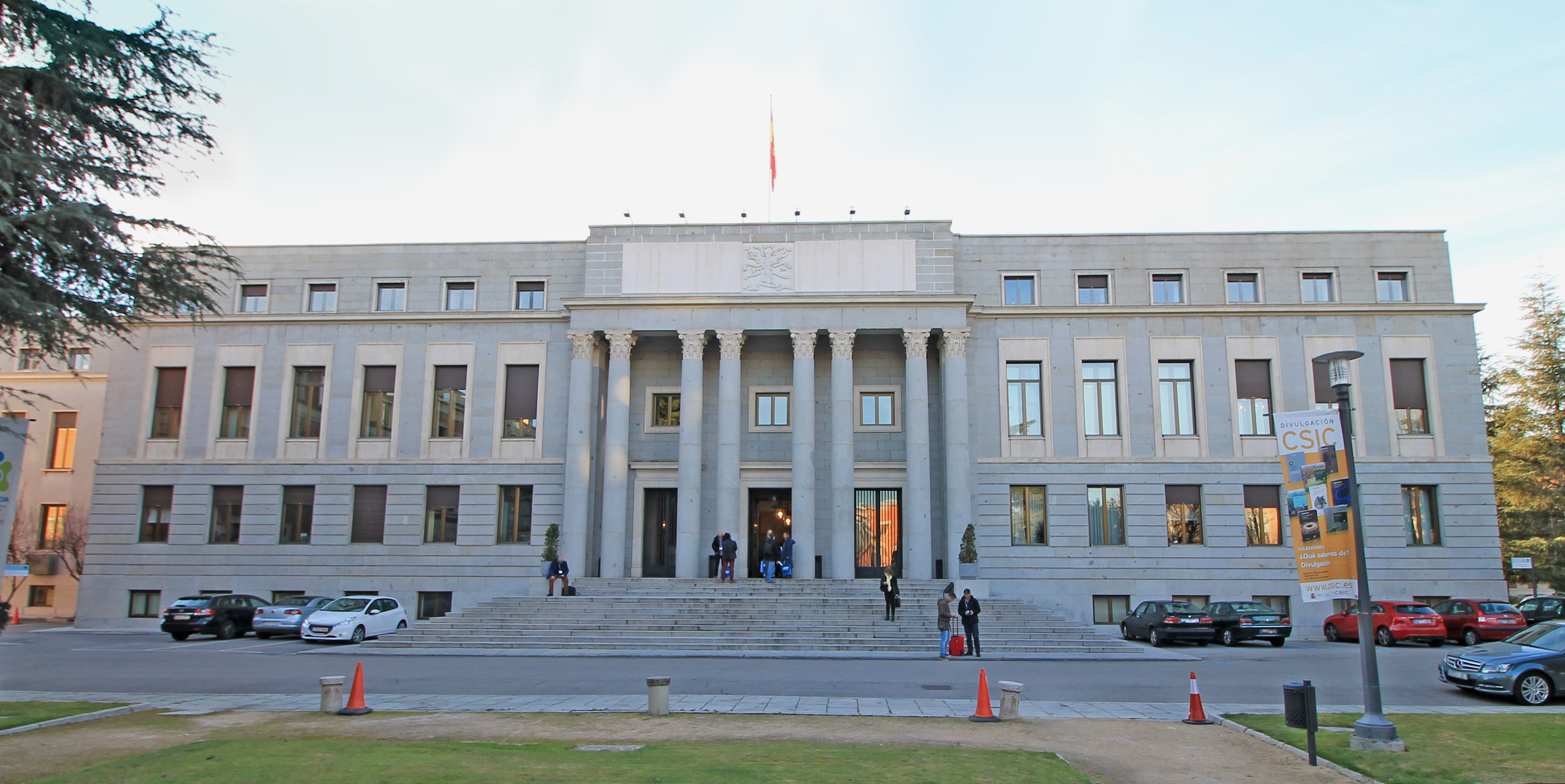
- Headquarters

Agency overview
- Formed: November 24, 1939; 86 years ago
- Preceding agency: Board for Advanced Studies and Scientific Research (1907–1939)
- Jurisdiction: Spain
- Headquarters: Serrano 117. 28006 Madrid
- Employees: 14,838 (2023)
- Annual budget: € 1.39 billion, 2022
- Agency executive: María Eloísa del Pino Matute, President
- Parent department: Ministry of Science
- Website: www.csic.es

The Spanish National Research Council (Spanish: Consejo Superior de Investigaciones Científicas, CSIC) is the largest public institution dedicated to research in Spain and the third largest in Europe. Its main objective is to develop and promote research that will help bring about scientific and technological progress, and it is prepared to collaborate with Spanish and foreign entities in order to achieve this aim.

CSIC plays an important role in scientific and technological policy, since it encompasses an area that takes in everything from basic research to the transfer of knowledge to the productive sector. Its research is driven by its centres and institutes, which are spread across all the autonomous regions. CSIC has 6% of all the staff dedicated to research and development in Spain, and they generate approximately 20% of all scientific production in the country. It also manages a range of important facilities; the most complete and extensive network of specialist libraries, and also has joint research units.

Significant latest research by CSIC is the Temperature and Winds for InSight (TWINS) module, which is a component of NASA's InSight Mars lander, which landed successfully on November 26, 2018. TWINS will monitor weather at the Mars landing site.

== Origins ==
The CSIC was established in 1939 by one of the first governments of Francisco Franco from the assets of the Board for Advanced Studies and Scientific Research (Spanish: Junta para la Ampliación de Estudios e Investigaciones Científicas (JAE, 1907–1939)), born within the Institución Libre de Enseñanza and inspired in the Krausist philosophy. The initial mandate of the CSIC was to restore the classical and Christian unity of the sciences that was destroyed in the 18th century ("la restauración de la clásica y cristiana unidad de las ciencias destruida en el siglo XVIII").

From its 1939 foundation to his 1966 death, its head was José María Albareda, one of the first members of the Opus Dei and a close friend of its founder, Josemaría Escrivá. José María Albareda was ordained a priest in 1959, and at his death was succeeded as head of CSIC by Manuel Lora-Tamayo, minister of Education from 1962 to 1968.

== Duties ==
According to the statute's article 5 of CSIC State Agency, the current objectives and functions of the CSIC are:

- To carry out scientific and technological research and help to encourage such research, where relevant.
- To transfer the results of scientific and technological research to public and private institutions.
- To provide scientific-technical services to the General State Administration and public and private institutions.
- To boost the creation of technologically based entities and companies.
- To help create entities with the ability to oversee the transfer and evaluation of technology.
- To train researchers.
- To train experts by means of highly specialised courses.
- To promote scientific culture in society.
- To manage scientific-technical facilities to be used by the scientific research and technological development system.
- To participate in international organs and bodies, as requested by the Ministry of Education and Science (the CSIC state agency currently belongs to the Ministry of Science and Innovation).
- To participate in national organs and bodies, as requested by the Ministry of Education and Science (the CSIC state agency currently belongs to the Ministry of Science and Innovation).
- To participate in designing and implementing the scientific and technological policies of the Ministry of Education and Science (the CSIC state agency currently belongs to the Ministry of Science and Innovation).
- To collaborate with other national and international institutions in the promotion and transfer of science and technology, as well as in the creation and development of scientific and technological research centres, institutes and units.
- To collaborate with universities in scientific research and technological development activities and in postgraduate education.
- To inform, attend and advise public and private entities on science and technology issues.
- To train experts in science and technology management.
- To collaborate in updating the science and technology knowledge skills of non-university teachers.
- To support the execution of the sectorial policies defined by the General State Administration, by preparing technical studies or through applied research activities.
- Any other scientific promotion and technological research actions assigned to it by applicable legislation or as commissioned by the Government.

== Scientific-technical areas ==
Its multidisciplinary and multisectorial nature means CSIC covers all fields of knowledge. Its activity is organised around eight scientific-technical areas:

- Area 1. humanities and social sciences in 17 centres
- Area 2. biology and biomedical science in 22 centres
- Area 3. natural resources in 24 centres
- Area 4. Agricultural sciences in 23 centres
- Area 5. Physical science and physical technology in 24 centres
- Area 6. Materials science and food technology in 13 centres
- Area 7. Food science and food technology in 8 centres
- Area 8. Chemical science and chemical technology in 16 centres

== Large facilities ==
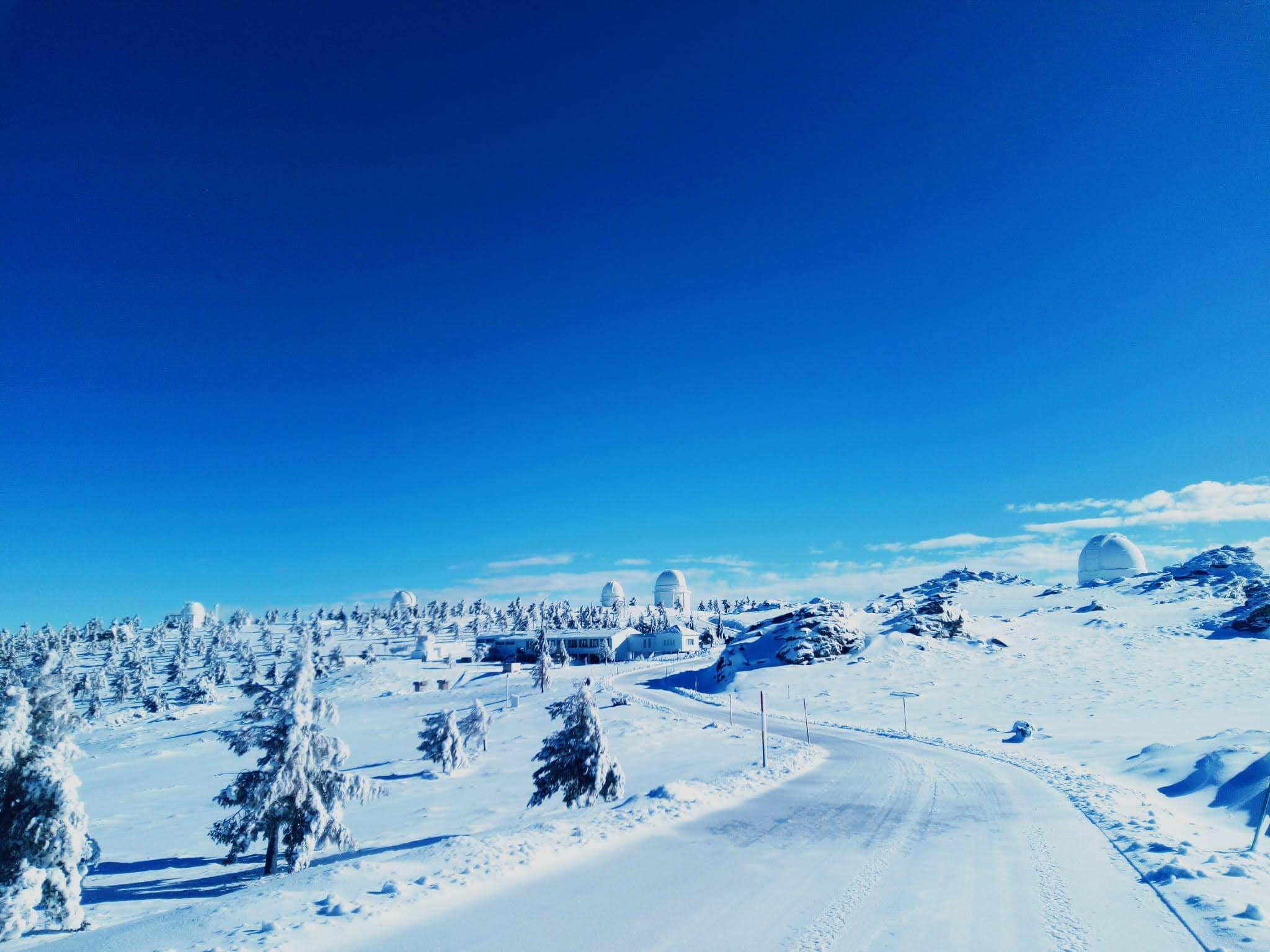
The astronomical observatory complex of Calar Alto, province of Almería, Spain

CSIC manages the "Singular Scientific and Technological Infrastructures" (ICTS) which are facilities involving relatively high investment and maintenance costs in relation to R&D investment budgets in their field. The science community and society at large can access them, which is justified by their importance and strategic nature, and for this reason they receive each year many national as well as foreign researchers. These large facilities are recognised and supported by the European Union.

CSIC administers the following 6 Spanish ICTS facilities:

- Calar Alto Astronomical Observatory
- Doñana Reserve – Biological Station
- Hespérides Oceanic Research Vessel
- Juan Carlos I Antarctic Base
- RV Sarmiento de Gamboa – Ocean Research Vessel
- The Integrated Micro and Nanofabrication Clean Room at the Microelectronics Institute of Barcelona

Spain participates in two large European facilities:

- European Synchrotron Radiation Facility
- Max von Laue-Paul Langevin Institute

== Research centres ==
As of January 2018 CSIC listed 139 specialized research centers carrying out research in the above-mentioned eight different fields.

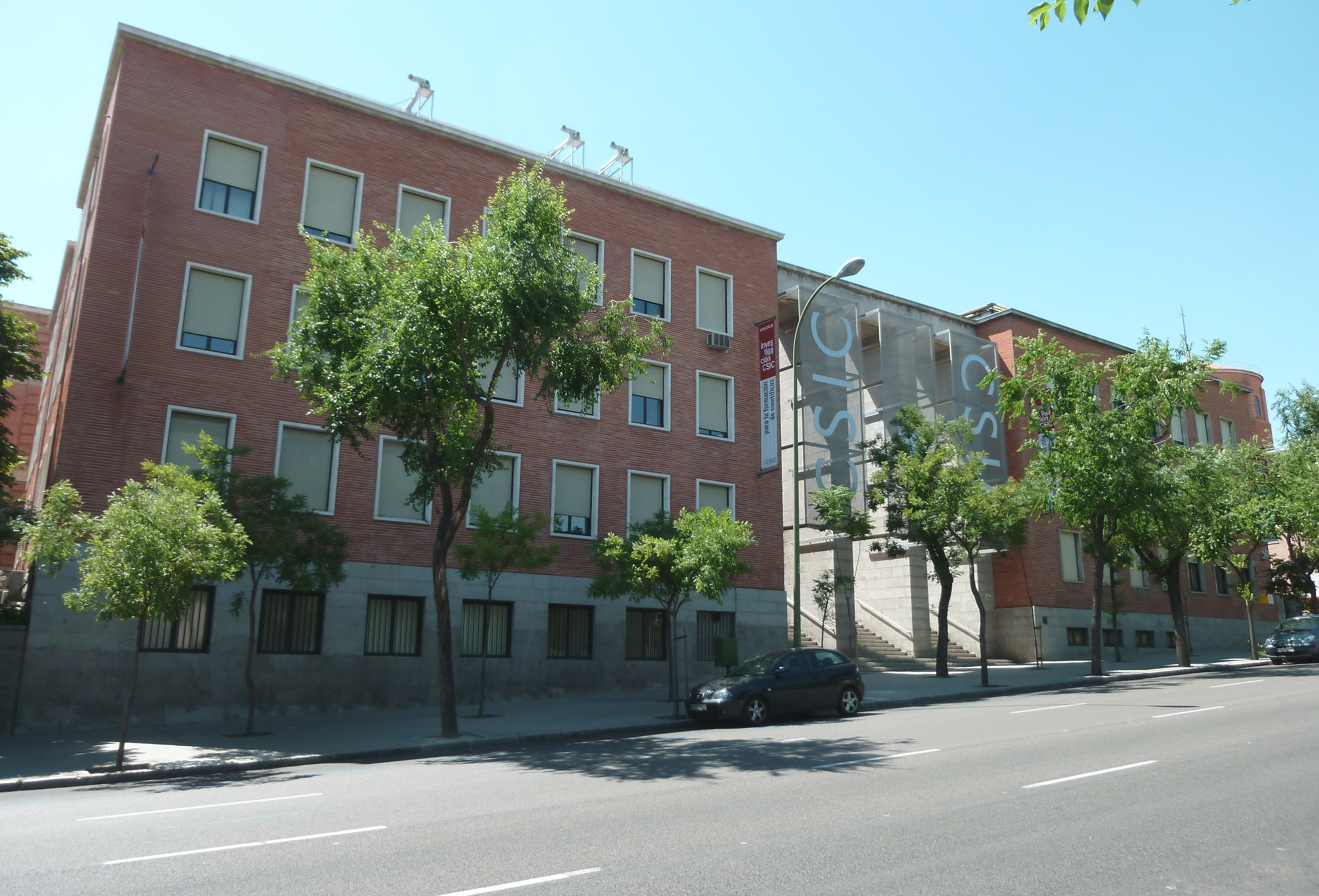
CSIC's Institute of Edaphology and Vegetable Physiology

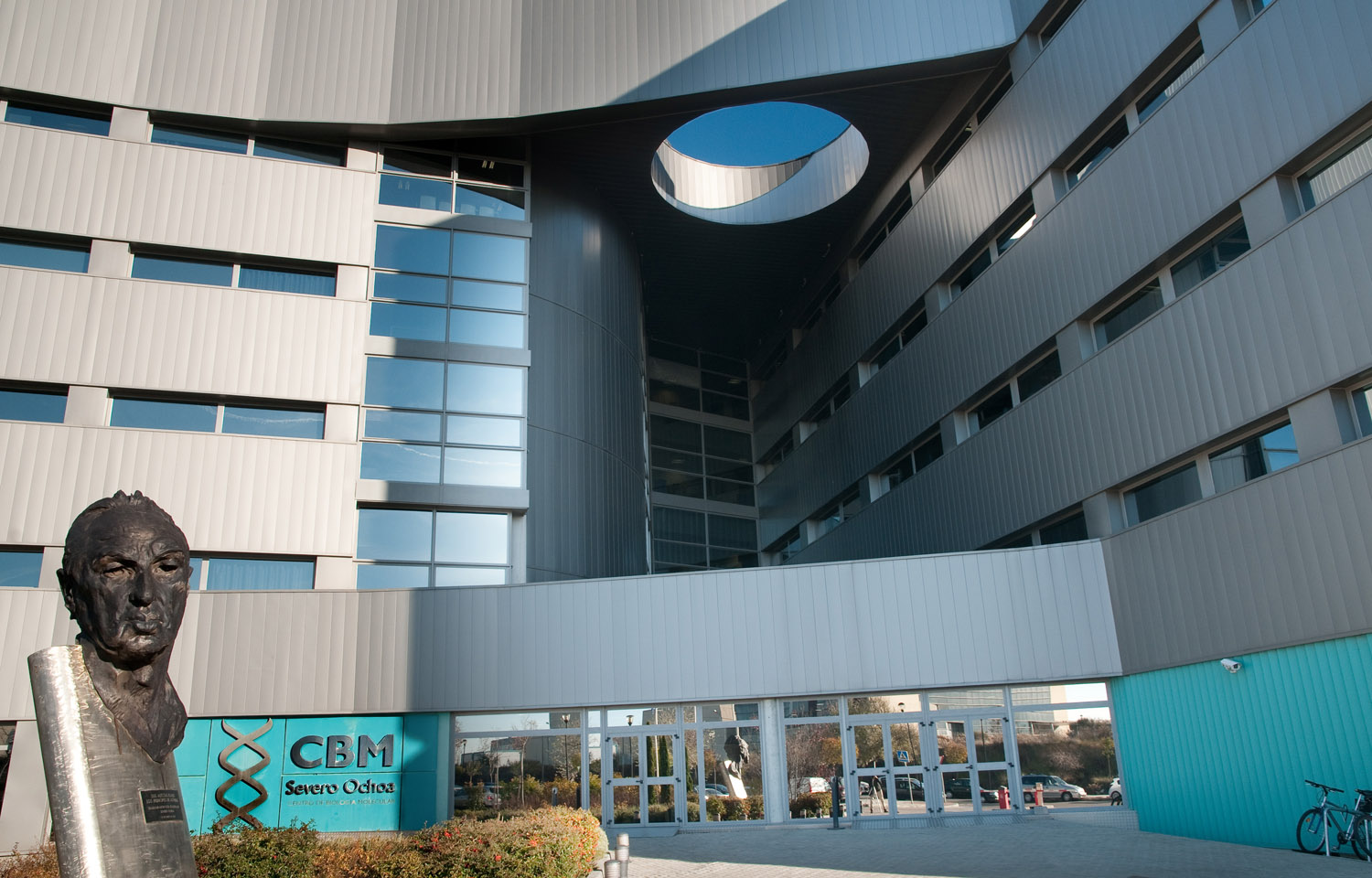
Centro de Biología Molecular (CBM-CSIC) "Severo Ochoa" in Madrid

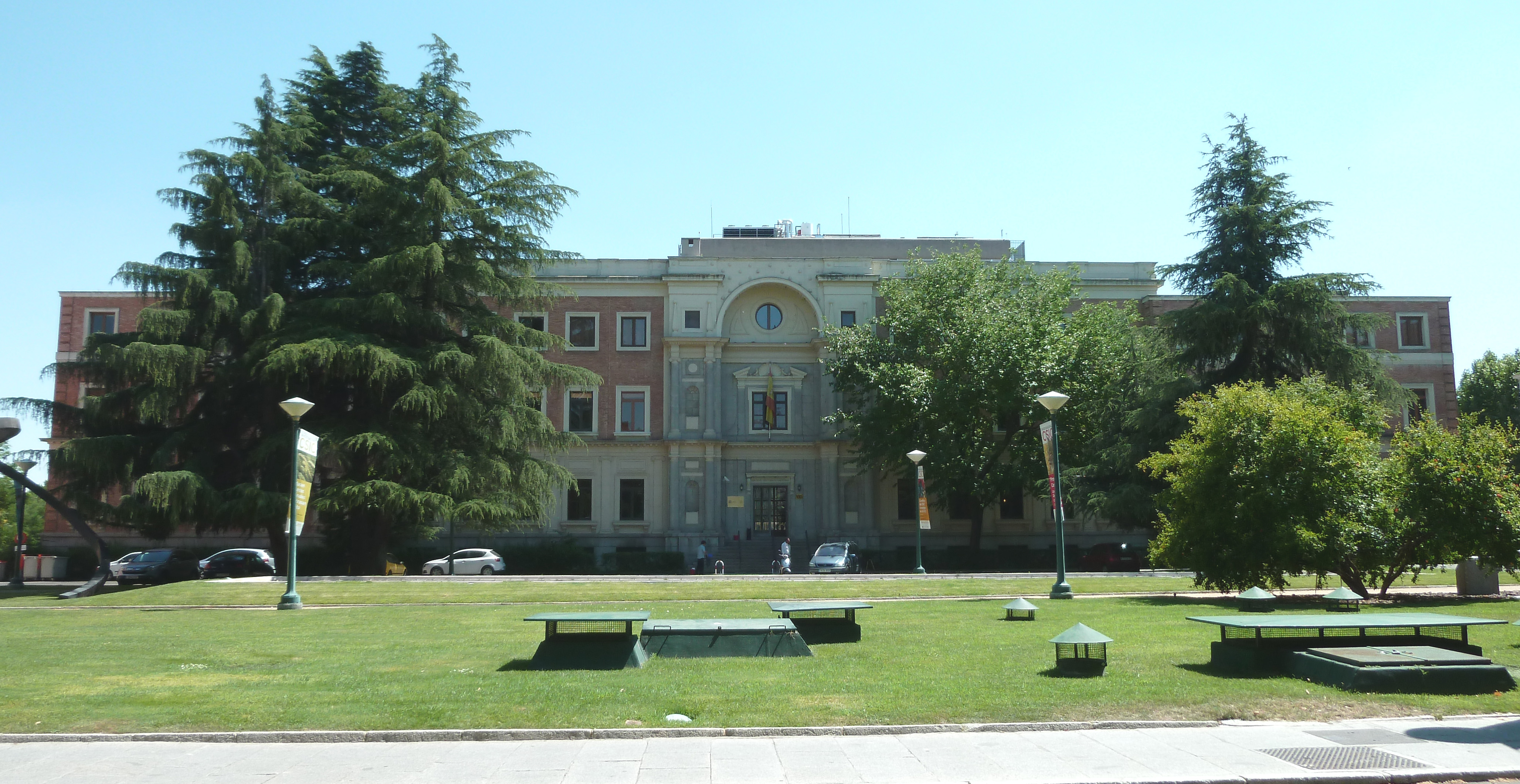
Spanish National Historical Archive

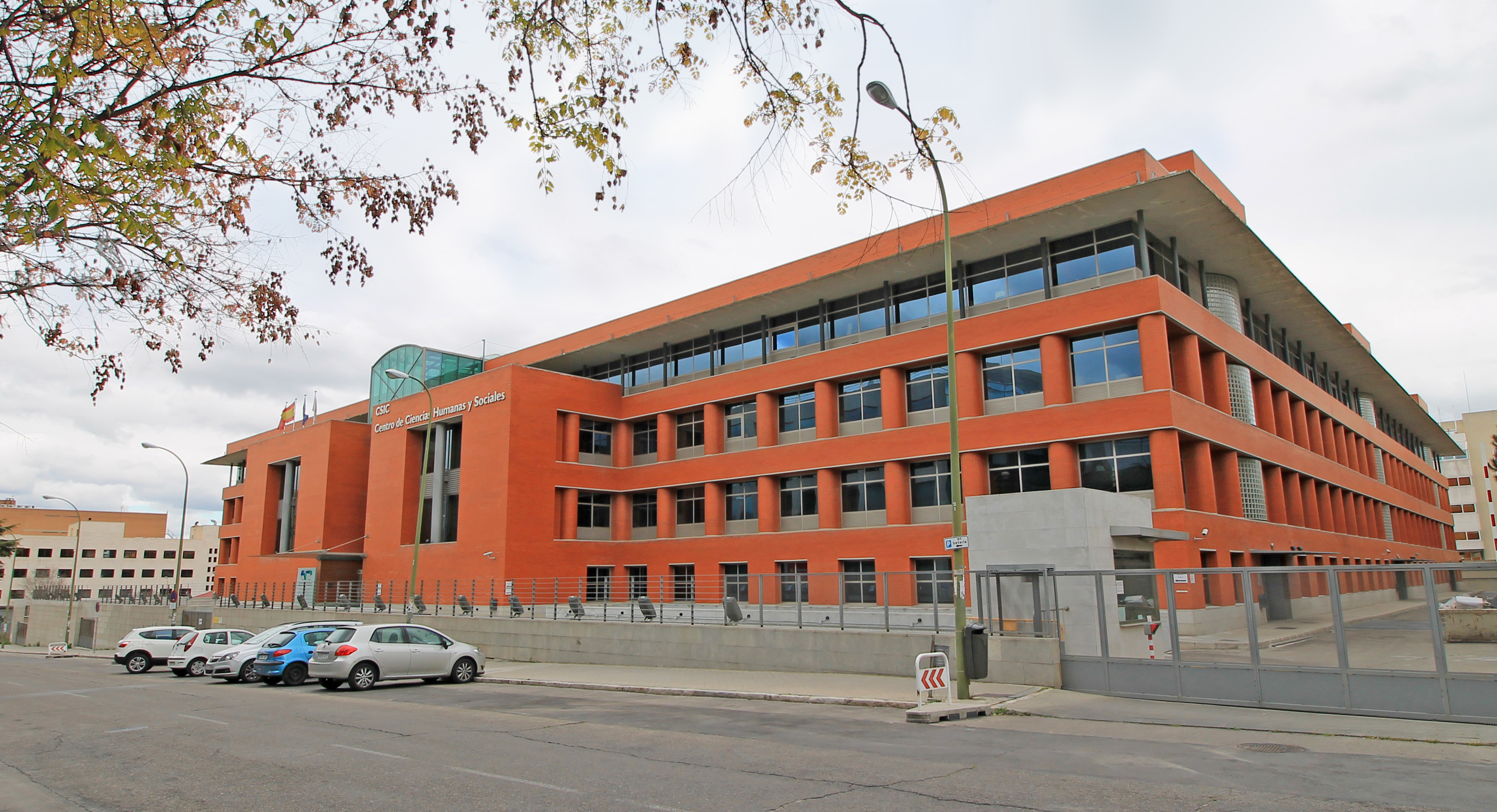
The headquarters of CSIC's Centre for Human and Social Sciences in Madrid

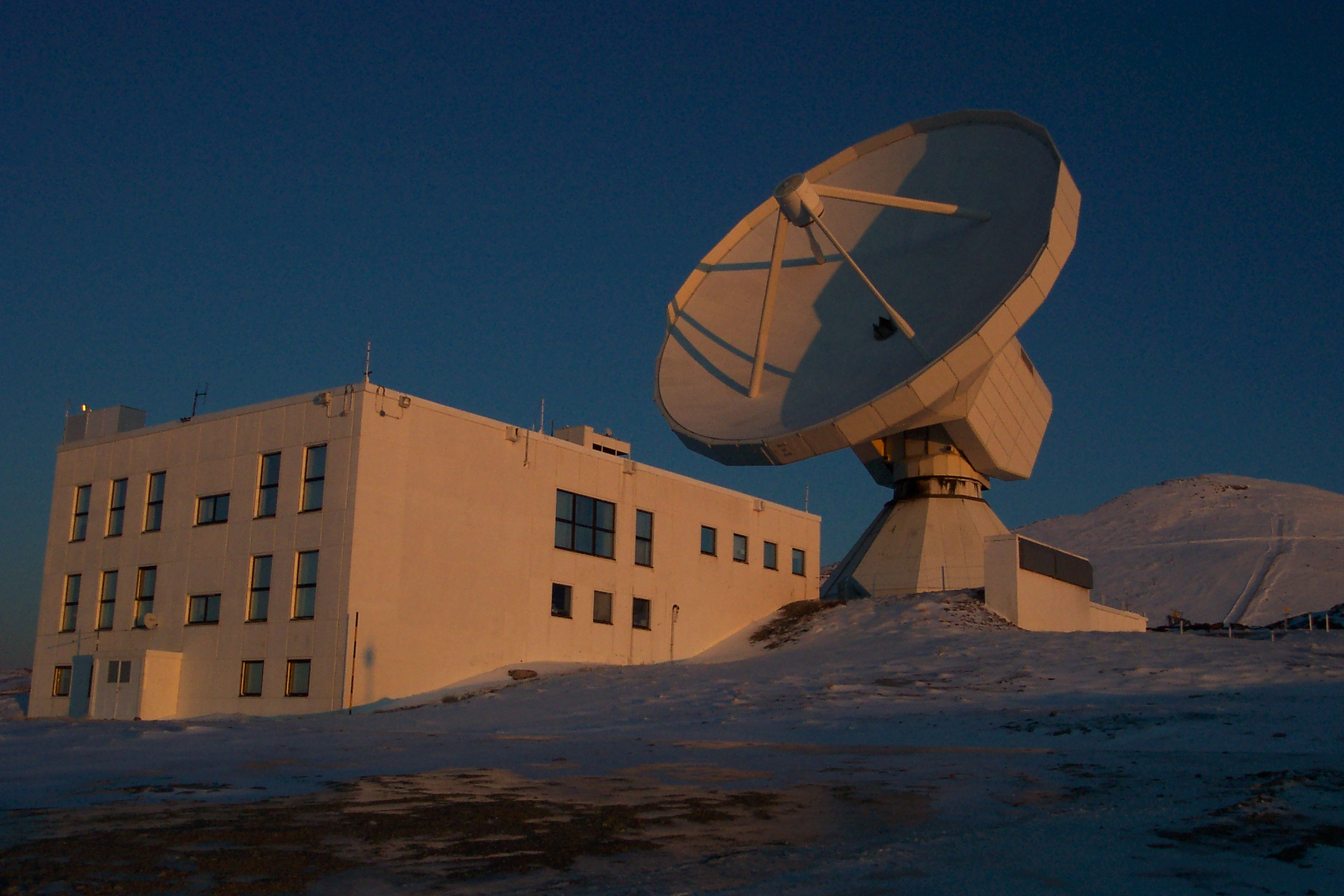
IRAM Pico Veleta Observatory

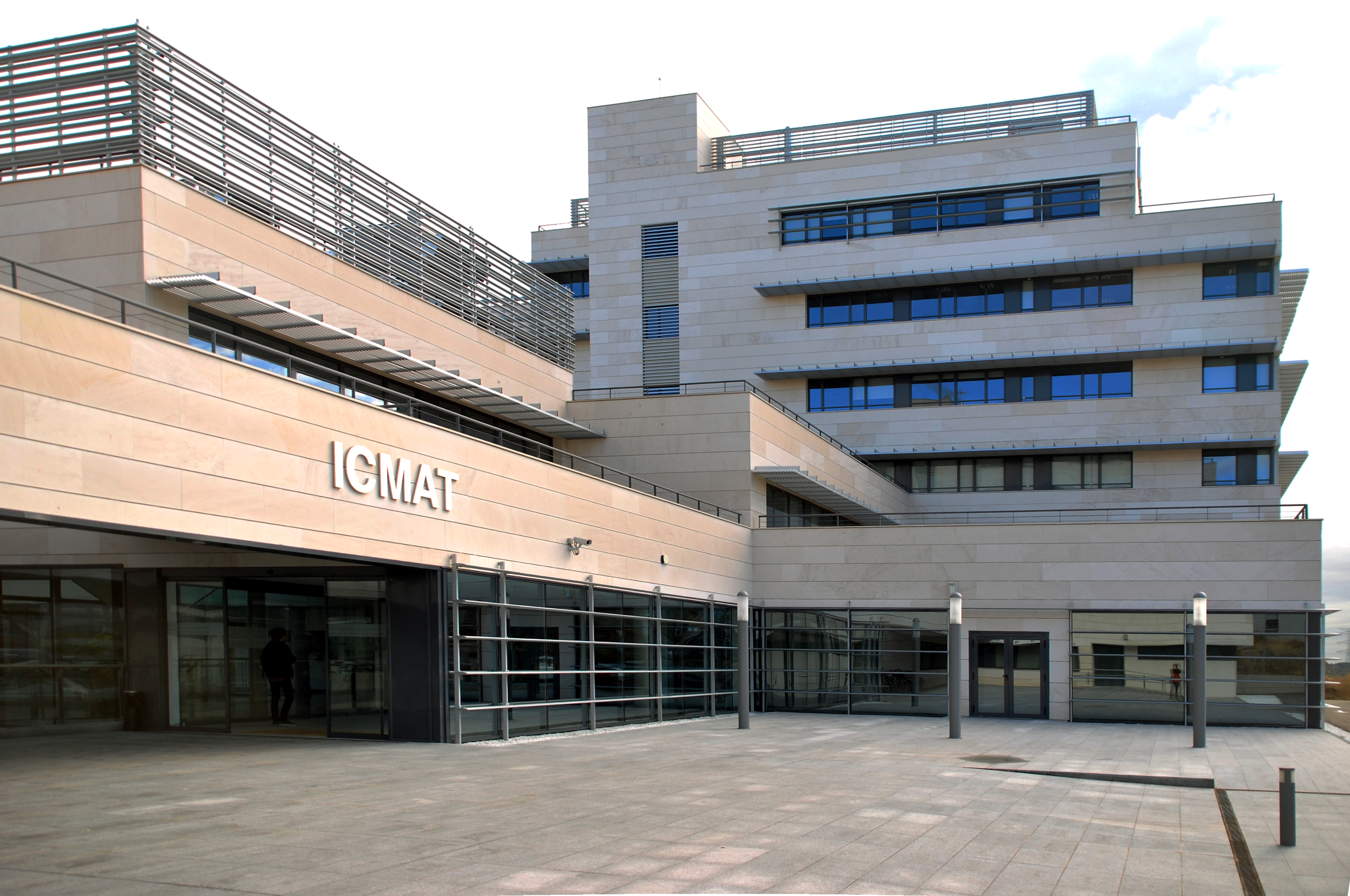
Instituto de Ciencias Matemáticas (ICMAT)

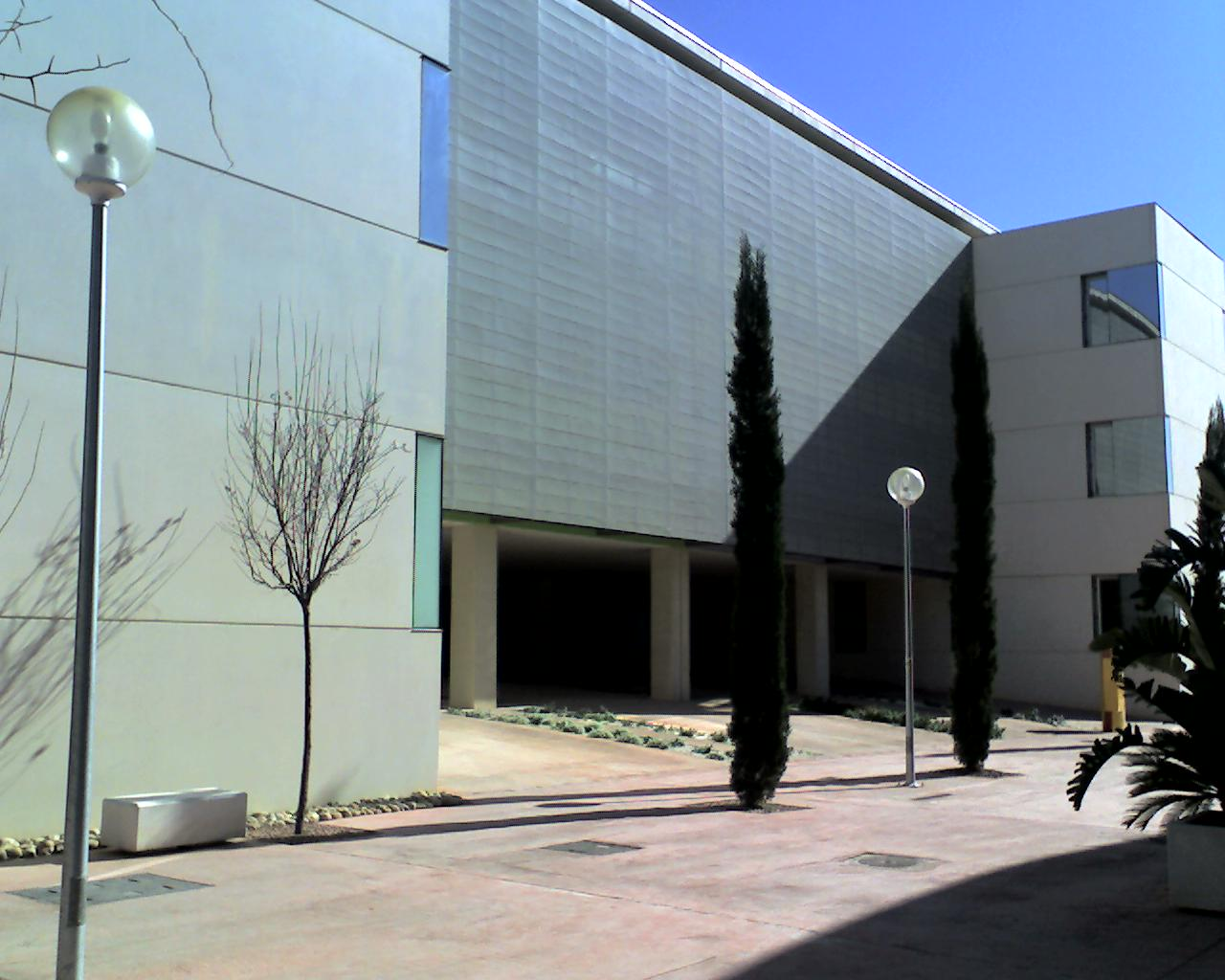
Neurosciences Institute UMH-CSIC at the Campus of Sant Joan d'Alacan

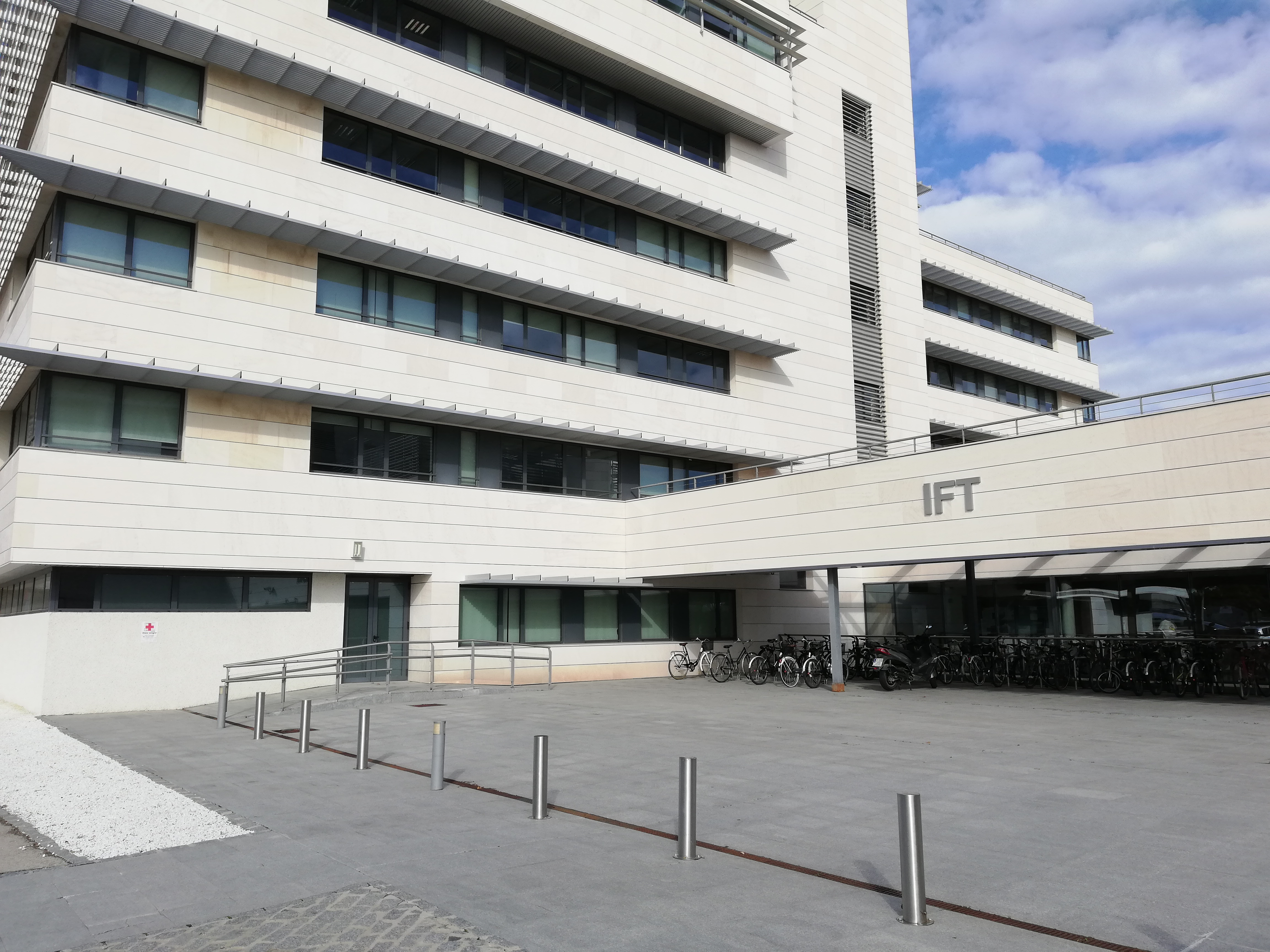
Instituto de Física Teórica UAM/CSIC

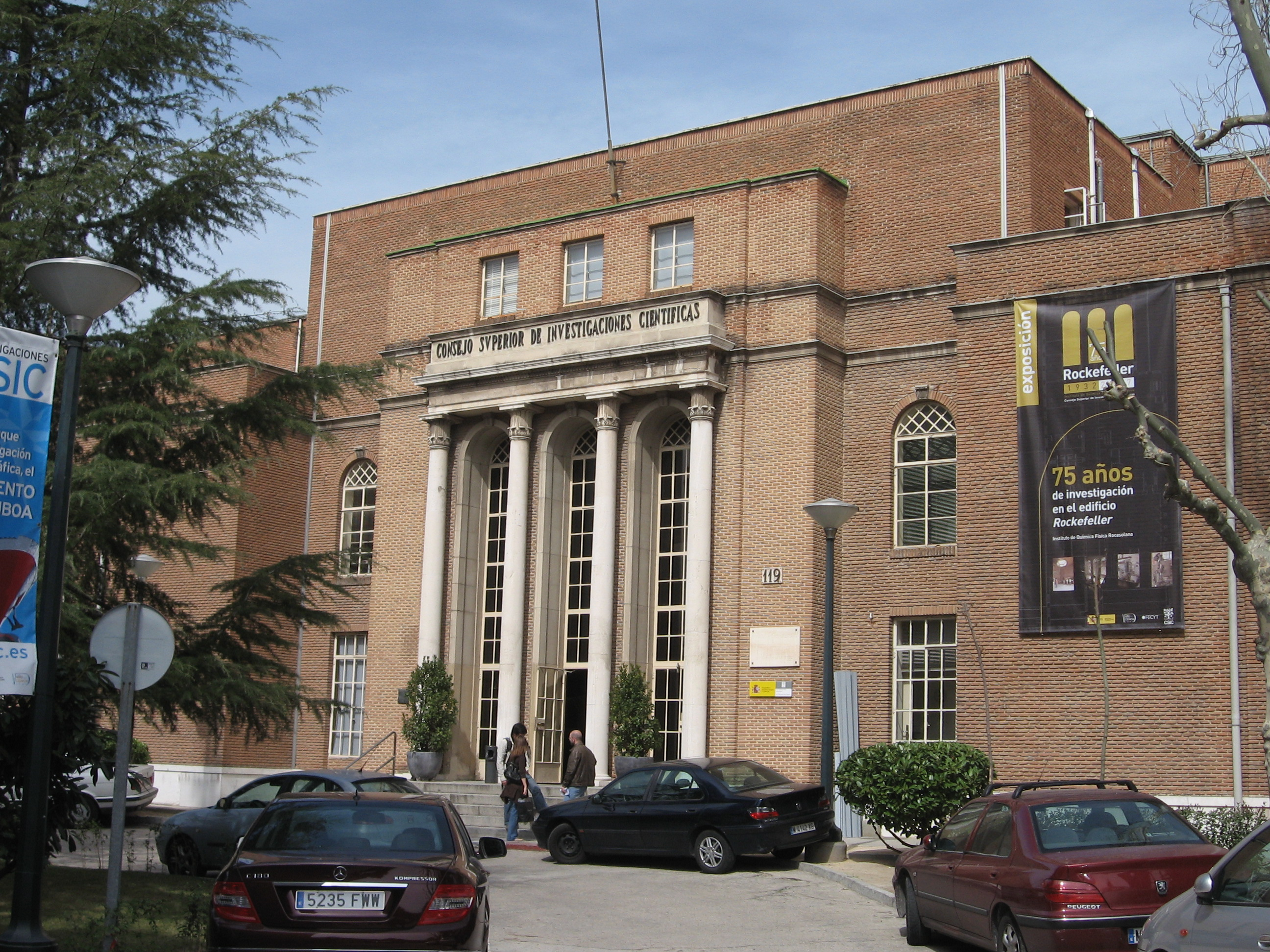
The "Rocasolano" Physical Chemistry Institute

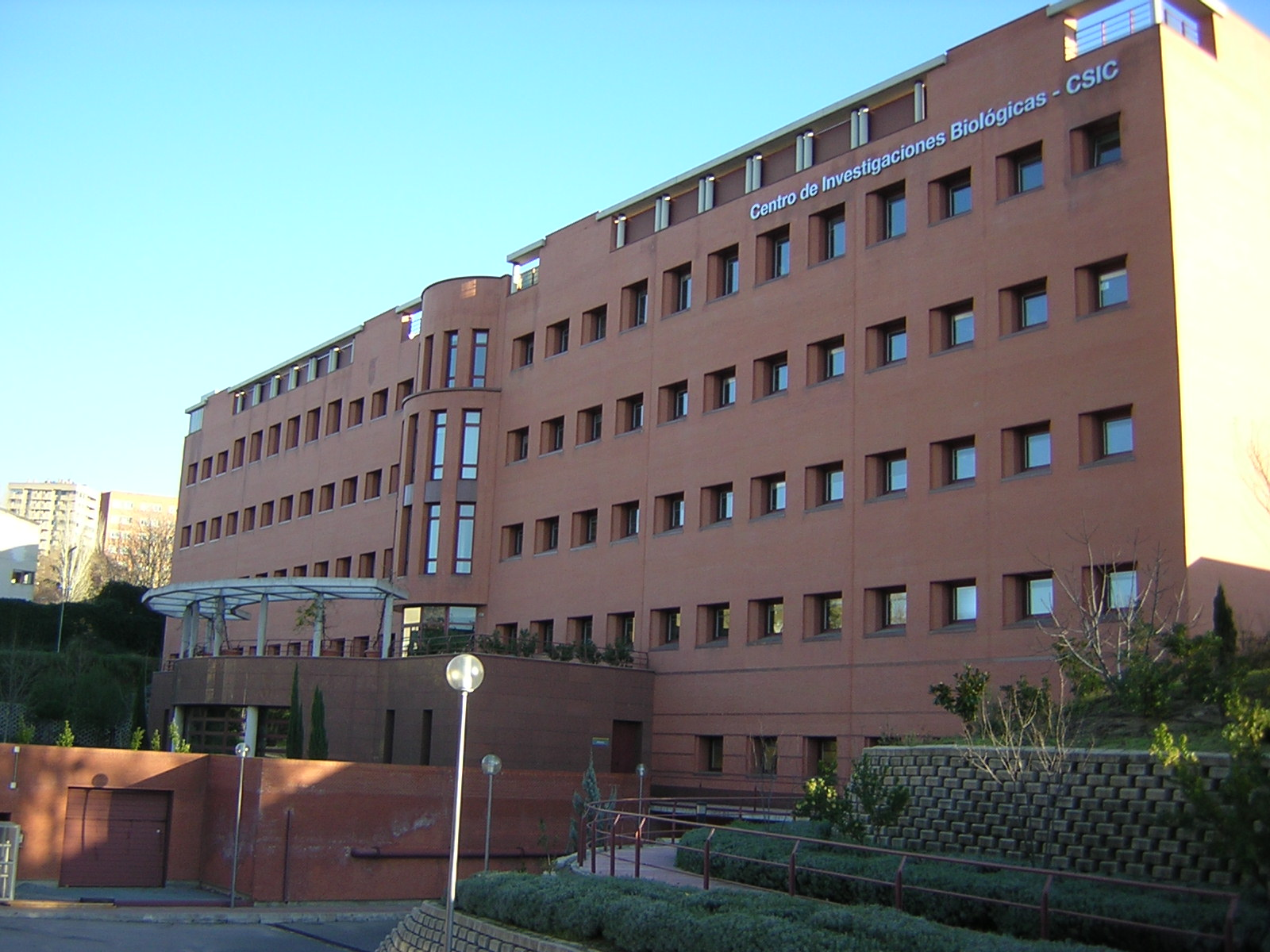
Centro de Investigaciones Biológicas (CIB-CSIC) "Margarita Salas"

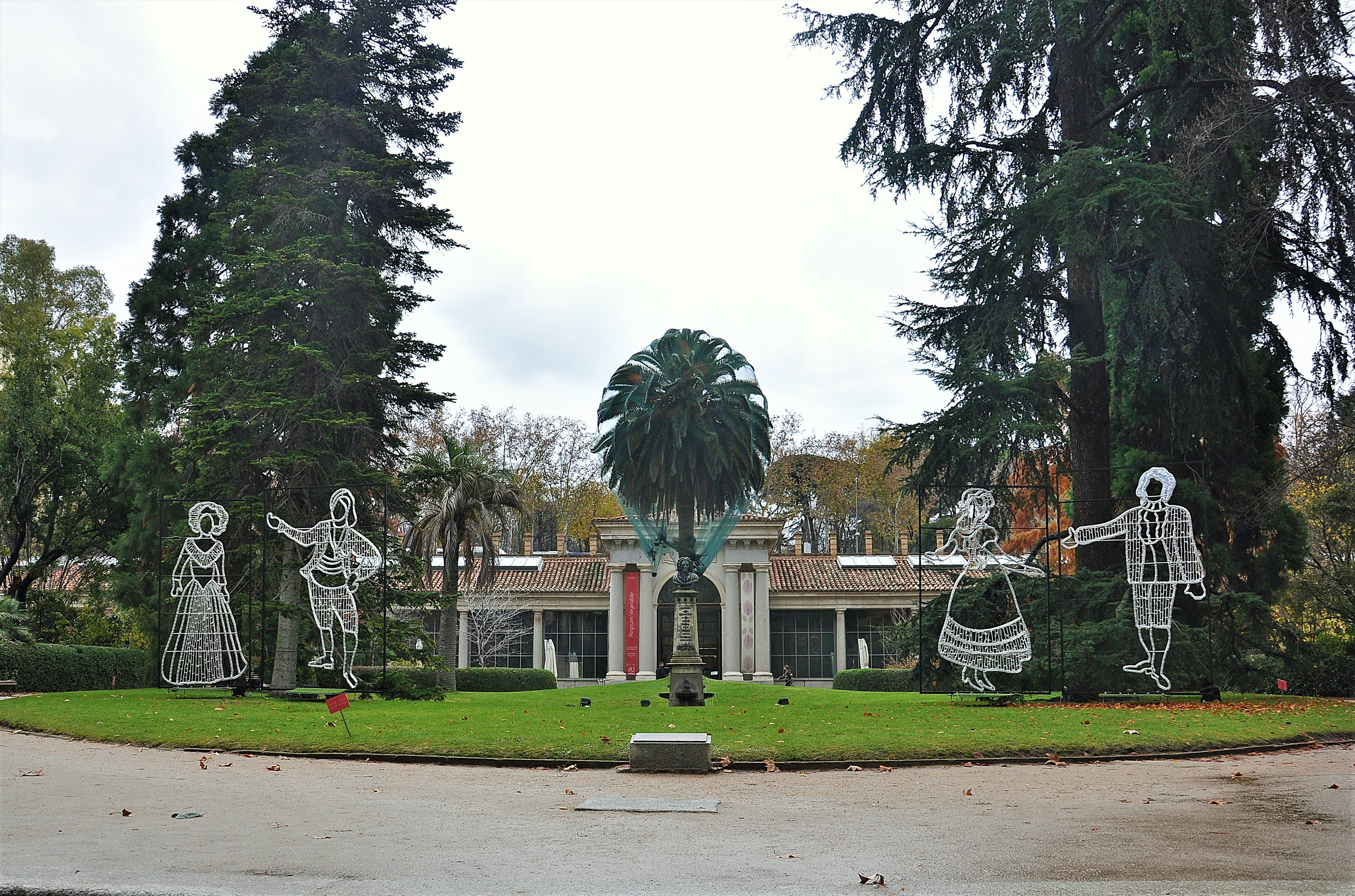
Royal Botanical Garden (RJB-CSIC) of Madrid

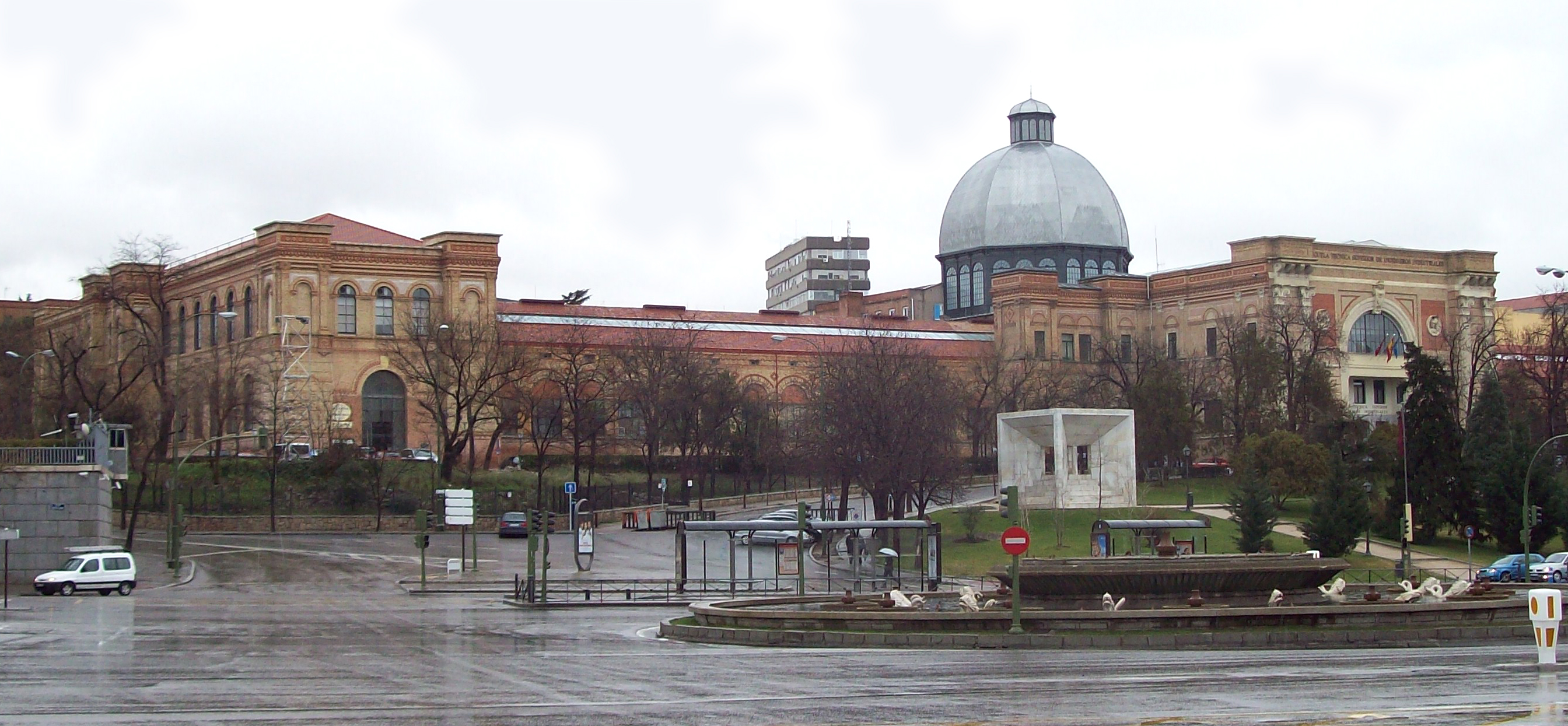
National Museum of Natural History (MNCN-CSIC) in Madrid

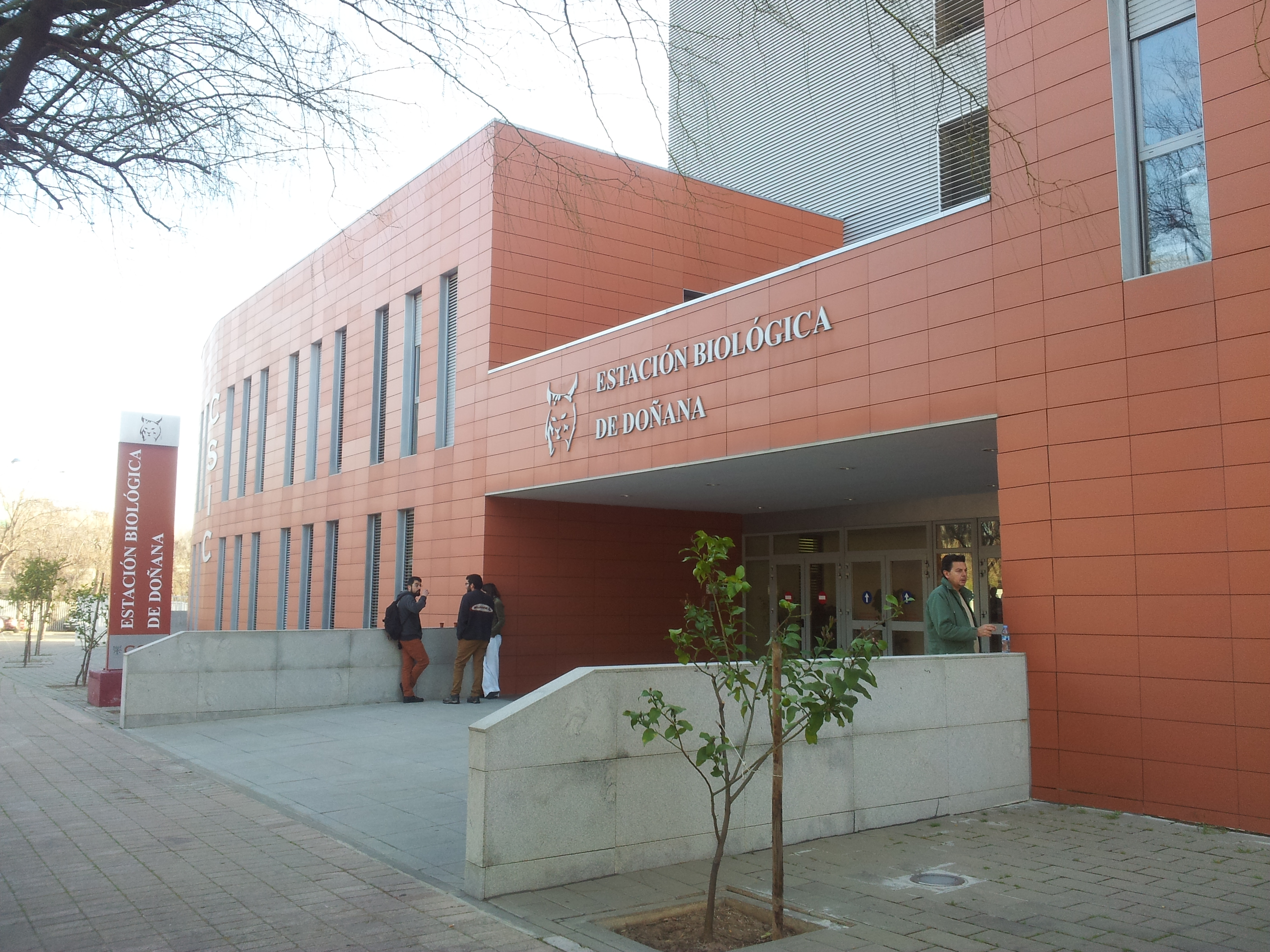
Doñana Biological Station (EBD–CSIC), EBD headquarters in Sevilla

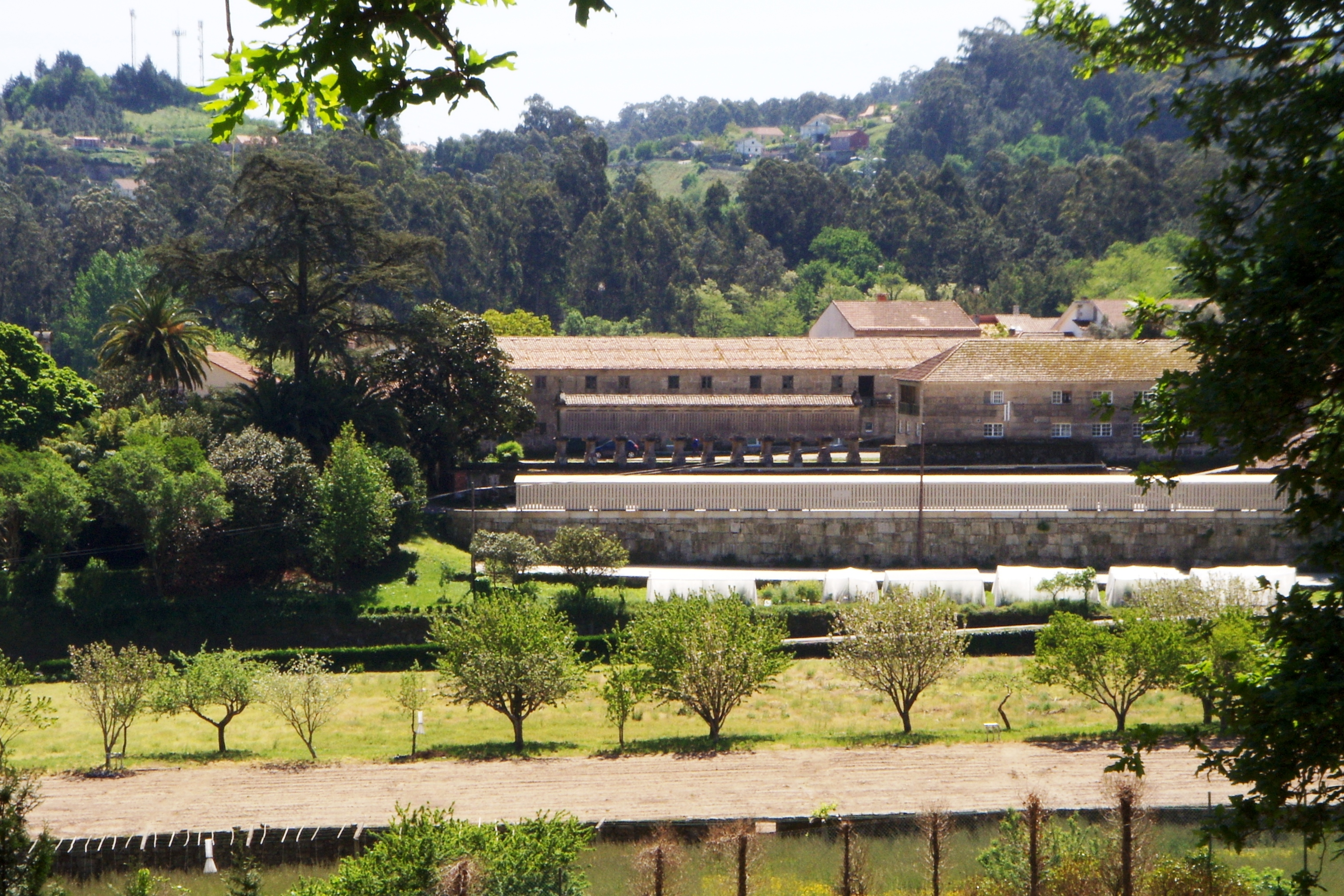
Biological Research Institute of Galicia, in Salcedo (Pontevedra)

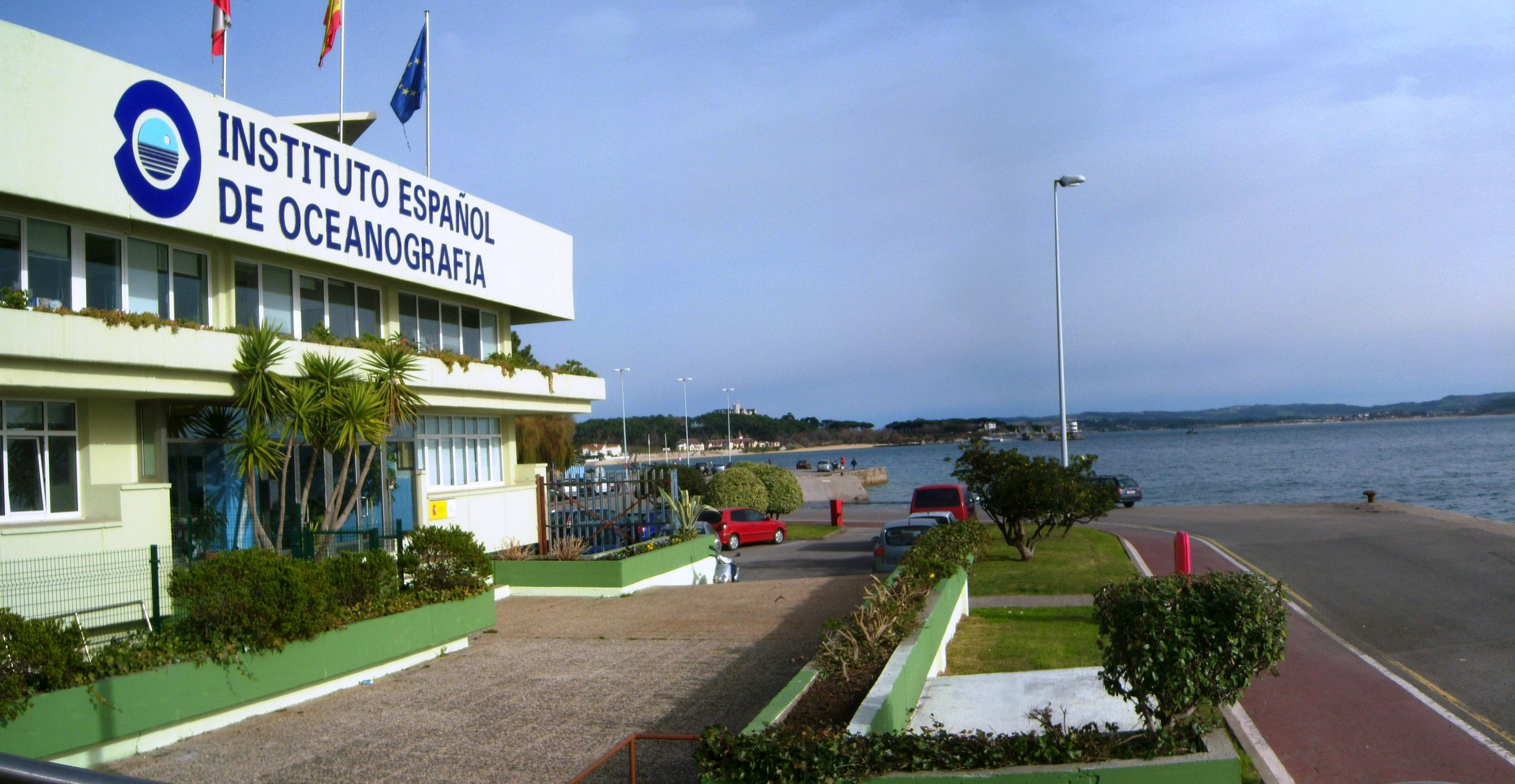
Spanish Institute of Oceanography (IEO-CSIC) in Santander

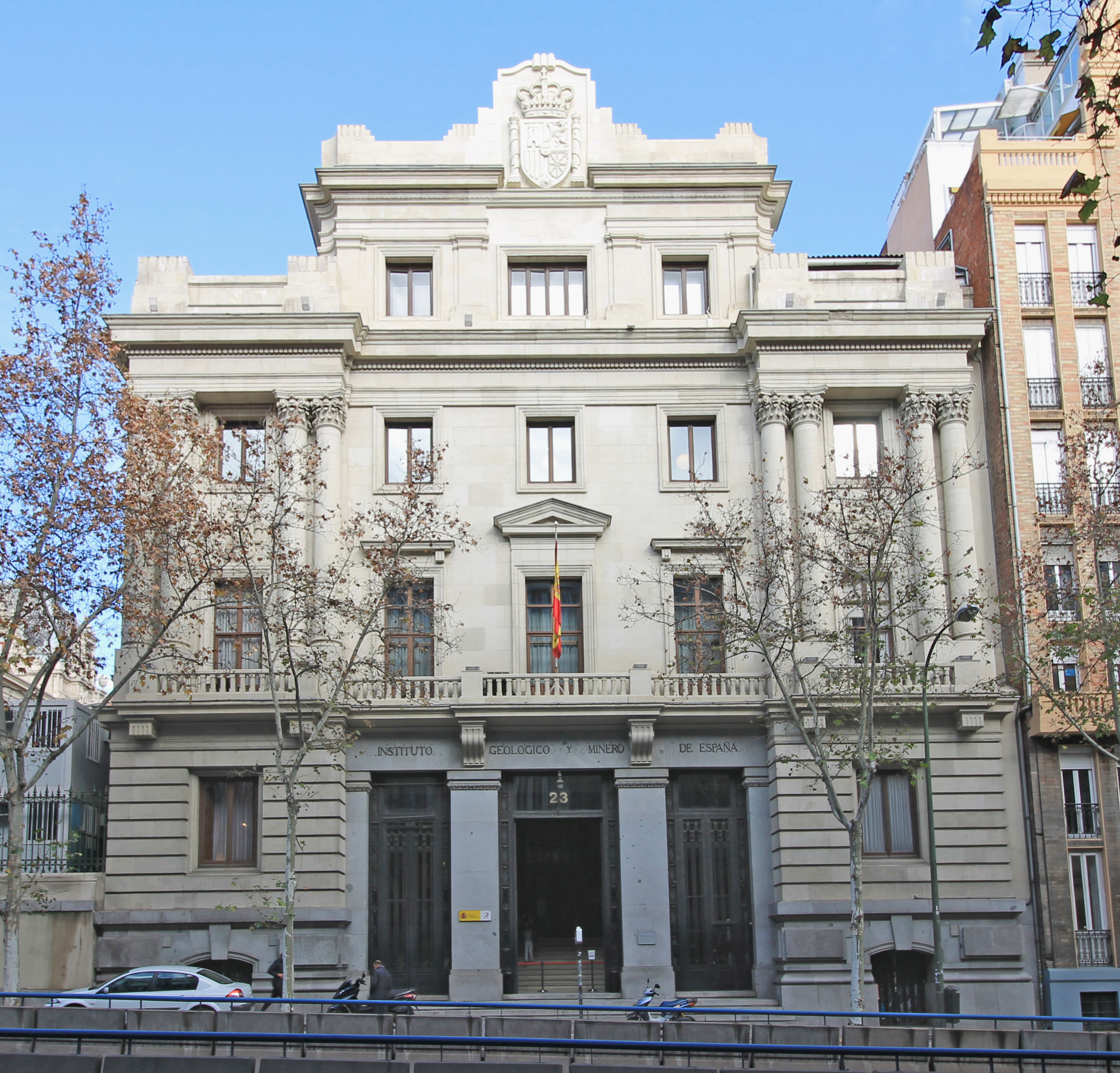
Geological Survey of Spain (IGME-CSIC), headquarters building in Madrid

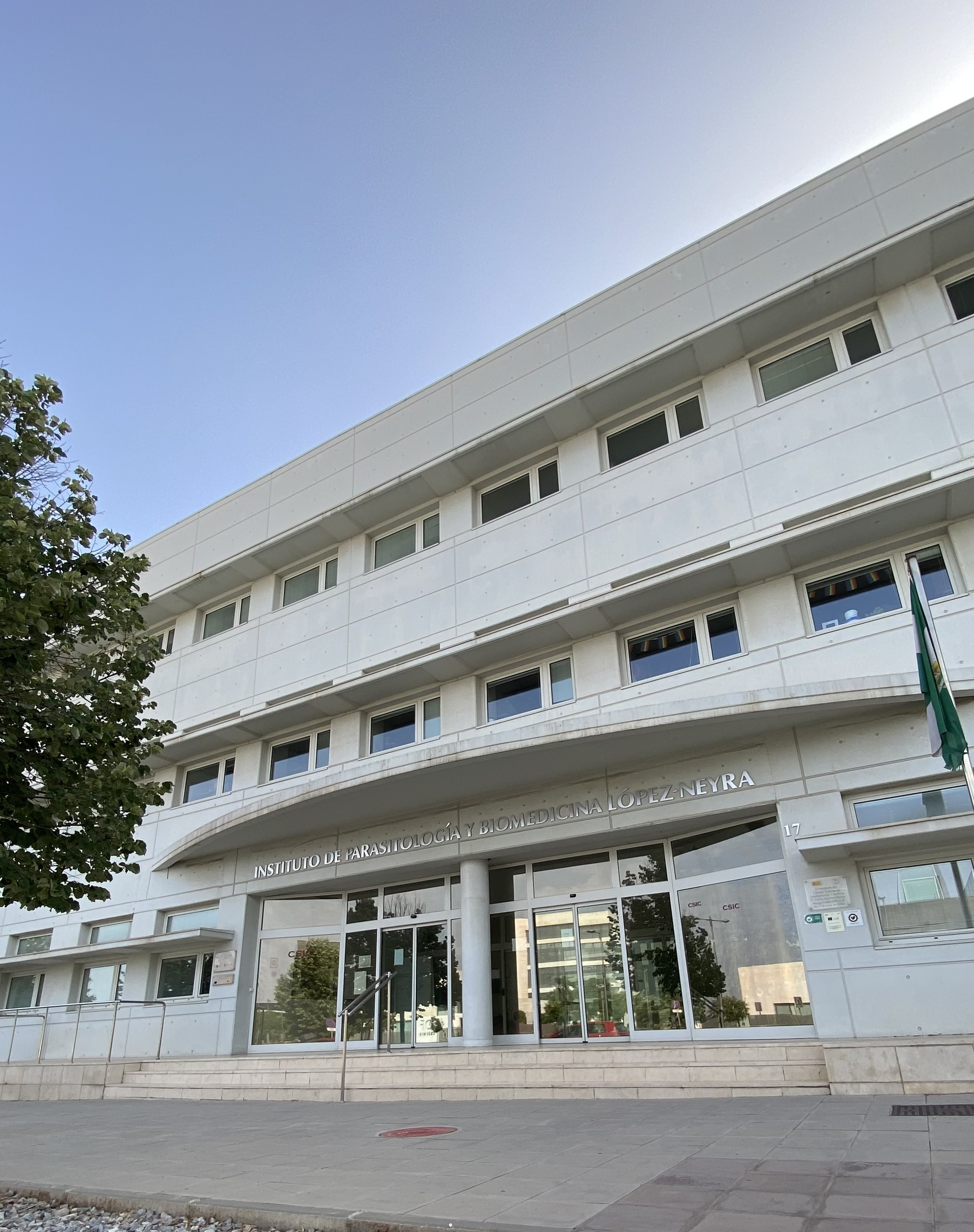
Institute of Parasitology and Biomedicine (IPB-CSIC) "López-Neyra" in Granada

== Literature ==
- Carlos Martinez Alonso: Re-founding the Spanish National Research Council: New Methods, New Culture, in: Max-Planck-Forum 7 : Perspectives of Research – Identification and Implementation of Research Topics by Organizations (Ringberg-Symposium Mai 2006), S. 59–70, ISSN 1438-8715

Publications of CSIC include:

- Archivo Español de Arqueología (AEspA), founded in 1940

== In popular culture ==
The Spanish National Research Council Headquarters serves as the exterior of The Royal Mint of Spain in the Spanish television series La Casa De Papel, also known by its English title Money Heist.

== See also ==
- Centre national de la recherche scientifique (CNRS), the French counterpart to the CSIC
- Max Planck Society, the German counterpart to the CSIC
- Ludwig Boltzmann Gesellschaft, the Austrian counterpart to the CSIC
- Riken, the Japanese counterpart to the CSIC
- Digital CSIC, the council's online research repository, est. 2008
- Spanish National Cardiovascular Research Centre
