= BIO Hespérides =

Spanish polar research vessel

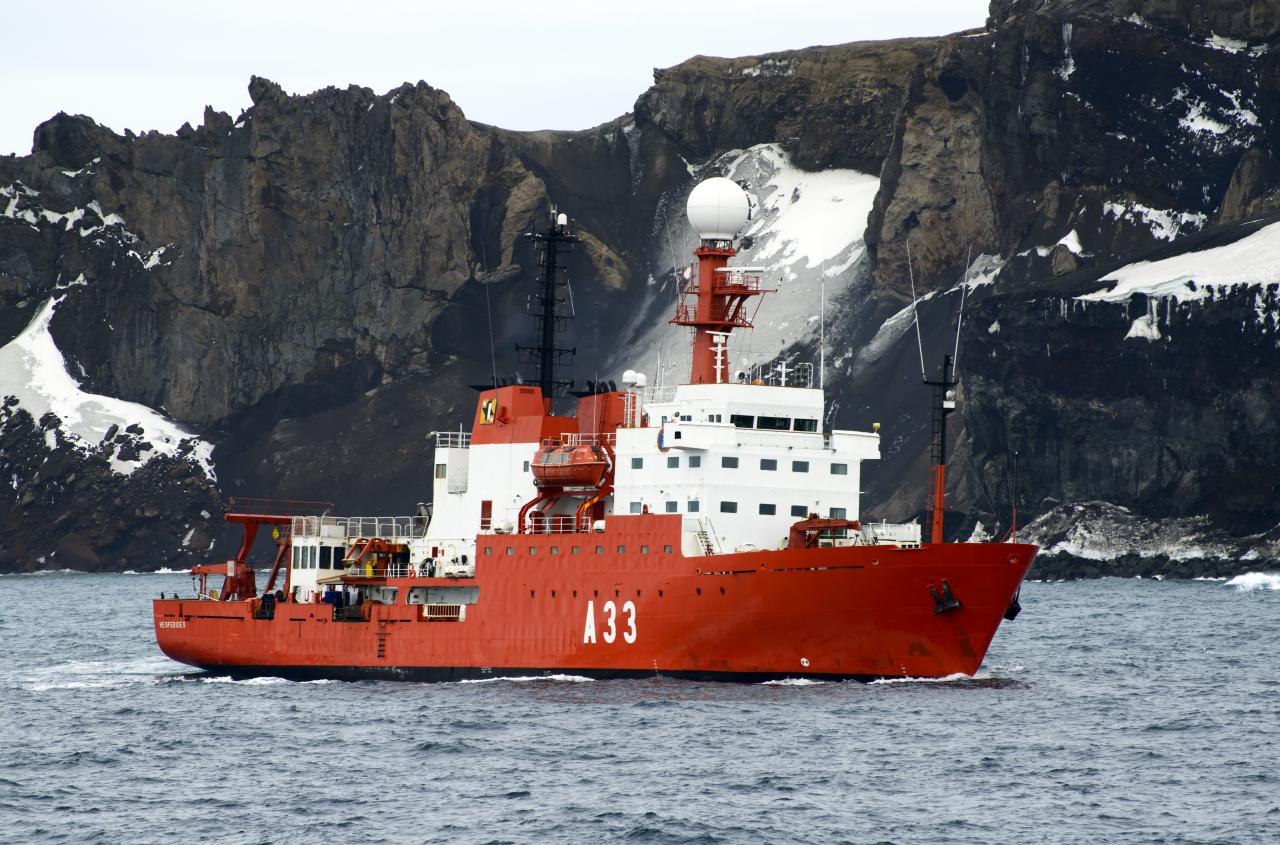
- Hespérides off Deception Island in January 2013

History

Spain
- Name: Hespérides
- Port of registry: Cartagena, Spain
- Builder: Empresa Nacional Bazán, Cartagena
- Laid down: 14 November 1988
- Launched: 12 March 1990
- Commissioned: 16 May 1991
- Refit: 2003–2004
- Identification: IMO number: 8803563; MMSI number: 224886000; Callsign: EBBW
- Status: Active

General characteristics
- Type: Research vessel
- Displacement: 1,983 t (1,952 long tons) standard; 2,750 t (2,707 long tons) full
- Length: 82.5 m (270 ft 8 in)
- Beam: 14.3 m (46 ft 11 in)
- Height: 7.35 m (24 ft 1 in)
- Draft: 4.42 m (14 ft 6 in)
- Ice class: 1C
- Installed power: 2 × Bazán- M.AN. Burmeister & Wain 14V, 1,904 hp (1,420 kW)
- Speed: 14.7 knots (27.2 km/h; 16.9 mph) in 0.5 m (1.6 ft) level ice
- Range: 12,000 nmi (22,000 km; 14,000 mi) at 12 knots (22 km/h; 14 mph)
- Endurance: 120 days
- Complement: 29 scientists
- Crew: 58
- Sensors & processing systems: 2 × DGPS; 2 radar ARPA ECDIS; GMDSS
- Aircraft carried: 1 × Agusta-Bell 212 helicopter
- Aviation facilities: Hangar

BIO Hespérides (A-33), is a Spanish polar research vessel. She was built in 1990, by Bazán Shipyards of Cartagena, Spain. Hespérides is used to service the research bases in Antarctica, mainly the Spanish Juan Carlos I Antarctic Base, as well as to perform research voyages. It is operated by the Spanish Navy and the responsible of the scientific equipment is the Spanish National Research Council.

Hespérides is classified by Lloyd's Register of Shipping with ice class 1C. She can move through up to 0.5 metres (1 ft 8 in) of ice at 5 knots (9.3 km/h; 5.8 mph). Her propulsion system uses a computer-controlled variable-pitch propeller and stern and bow thrusters. The vessel carries one helicopter.

== Name ==
Buque de Investigación Oceanográfica Hespérides, 'Oceanographic Research Vessel Hesperides', is named after Hesperides, the Greek nymphs of the evening, located on the Western Mediterranean.

== History ==
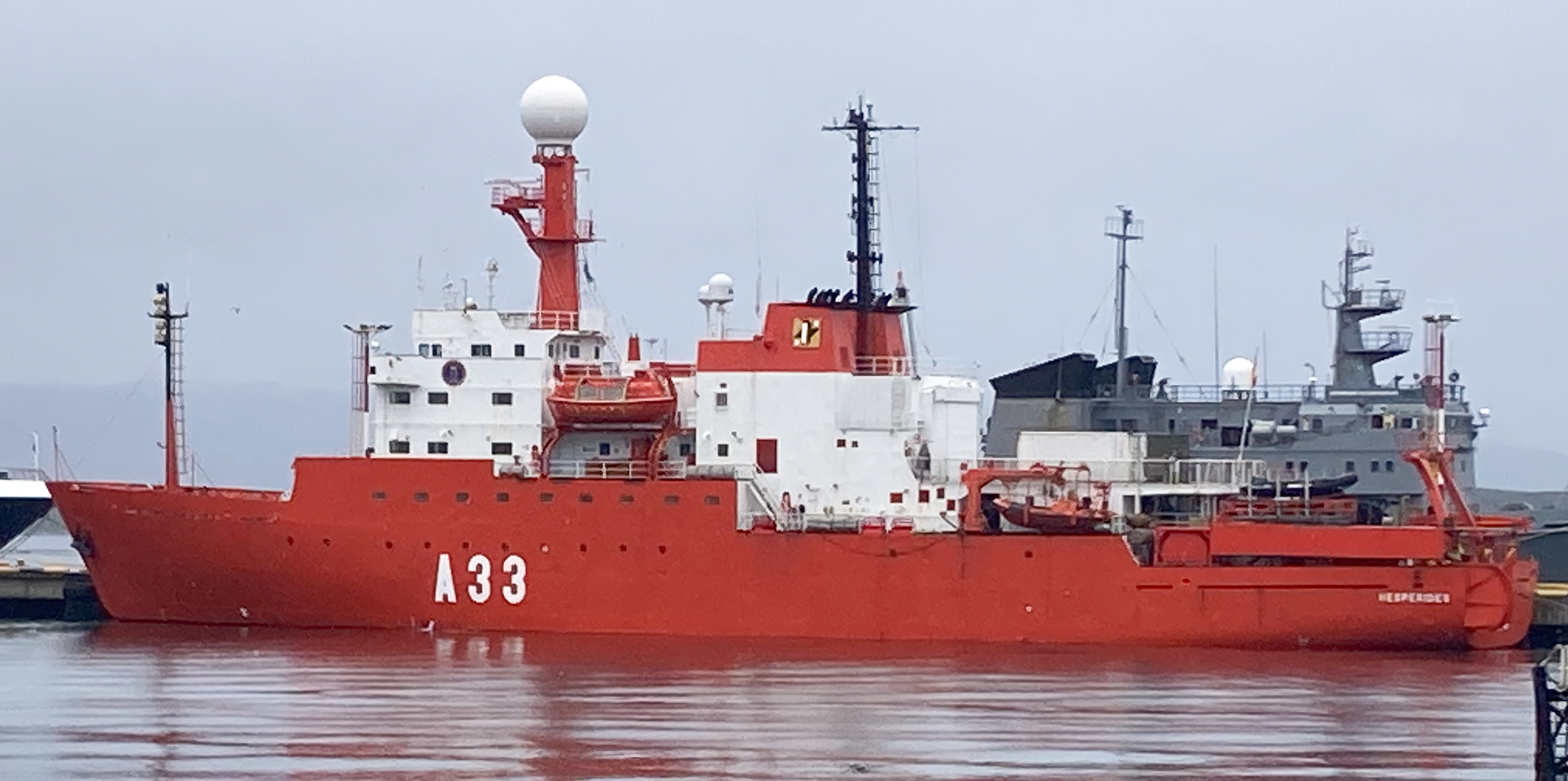
BIO Hesperides in 2024

- In 2003–2004, she was the subject of a thorough renovation, the hull was strengthened even more to break ice, all systems were improved and the habitability of the ship. The vessel is equipped with 11 laboratories, spread over 345 m^{2} and located on the main deck and below.
- In 2009, the vessel participated in a high-profile rescue of Ocean Nova, a vessel with 106 people in the Antarctic.
- In 2010, the vessel participated in the Malaspina Expedition.

== See also ==
- [[RV Sarmiento de Gamboa|RV Sarmiento de Gamboa]]
- History of research ships
- List or research vessels by country
