= Union (sloop) =

American sloop built in Somerset, Massachusetts in 1792

History

United States
- Name: Union
- Laid down: 1792, Somerset, Massachusetts
- Launched: 1792

General characteristics
- Class & type: sloop
- Tons burthen: 94 (bm)
- Length: 65 ft 5 in (19.9 m)
- Beam: 19 ft 9 in (6.0 m)
- Depth: 8 ft 5 in (2.6 m)
- Decks: One
- Propulsion: Sail (one mast)
- Sail plan: Fore-and-aft rig
- Crew: 22
- Armament: 10 cannon (6-pounder and 3-pounder); 8 swivel guns on the rails

Union was an American sloop built in Somerset, Massachusetts in 1792. It is best known for its circumnavigation of the world, 1794–1796, under the maritime fur trader John Boit.

The sloop Union was 94 tons burthen, 65 ft 5 in (19.9 m) length overall, 19 ft 9 in (6.0 m) beam, and 8 ft 5 in (2.6 m) depth. She had a crew of 22, one deck, one mast, and a fore-and-aft rig. Her armament was 10 carriage guns, which were a mix of 6-pounders and 3-pounders, and 8 swivel guns mounted on the rails.

Union was built in 1792 and registered on 8 July 1793. Her original owners were William Burroughs (merchant), John Nicolas (trader), Benjamin Hicks (mariner), and John Finch. She was re-registered on 26 August 1794 under the new owners Caleb Garner (merchant of Newport, Rhode Island), Crowell Hatch and Peter Brooks (merchants of Boston), and master John Boit. After Boit's voyage Union was sold on 22 July 1796, in Boston.

John Boit had served as fifth mate on the second voyage of the Columbia Rediviva under Captain Robert Gray, 1790–1793. Shortly after returning to Boston Boit was given command of the Union for another maritime fur trading voyage to the Pacific Northwest and China. The sloop was owned by three investors including Boit's brother-in-law Crowell Hatch, who had also been an investor in the two voyages of Columbia Redivia, under Robert Gray and John Kendrick.

== Circumnavigation ==
Boit sailed Union from Newport, Rhode Island, on 1 August 1794. He passed the Cape Verde Islands without stopping in October. The Falkland Islands were reached near the end of the year. Boit remained in the Falklands for about three weeks before leaving on 23 January 1795. Rounding Cape Horn the Union reached its southernmost latitude on 4 February 1795.

On 16 May 1795 he arrived at Columbia Cove, near Nasparti Inlet in Checleset Bay, on the west coast of Vancouver Island near Brooks Peninsula. He had been there three years before with Captain Gray on Columbia. After acquiring all the sea otter he could, he sailed south to Nootka Sound. From there he sailed north to Haida Gwaii to trade with the native Haida for sea otter furs. After trading with the Haida in the vicinity of Houston Stewart Channel and the village of Ninstints the Union cruised north up the eastern side of Haida Gwaii to the vicinity of the village known as Cumshewa. Then he returned south to Ninstints and cruised up the western side of Haida Gwaii until reaching the northern end in June, 1795. Boit traded with the Haida of Chief Cuneah in the area near Cloak Bay, Langara Island, and villages such as Dadens and Kiusta. Then Boit sailed the Union south to the Strait of Juan de Fuca, the Columbia River, and Tillamook Bay, again trading for sea otter furs. For nine days he attempted to enter the Columbia River. But the weather was against him and he nearly lost the Union on the dangerous Columbia Bar before giving up in disappointment.

From Tillamook Bay Boit sailed north again, stopping briefly at Nootka Sound. By August, 1795, Union was again cruising the southeast coast of Haida Gwaii and the west coast of Vancouver Island.

On 12 September 1795 Boit, having finished his fur trading, sailed from Columbia Cove, making for the Hawaiian Islands and Guangzhou (Canton), China.

Boit reached Hawaii on 12 October 1795. On 16 October, along the north coast of the Island of Hawaii, he met John Young, a British–American sailor who had been left on the island by Simon Metcalfe in 1790. Young had become an important advisor to the Hawaiian King Kamehameha I and frequently met with and assisted visiting ships. Young told Boit a great deal of information about the situation in the island, of other ships that had visited and other trading captains, including accounts of the death of John Kendrick, and of Simon Metcalfe and his son Thomas Metcalfe. Boit wrote a very long journal entry describing all the things he had learned from Young. This entry is now a vital primary source account about a variety of topics.

Boit offered to take Young to Canton, but Young declined, saying that his situation in Hawaii was far better than a common sailor like himself could ever hope to achieve anywhere else in the world. When Young left the Union late that night he discovered one of Boit's crew hiding in his canoe, having hoped to stay in Hawaii. The crewmember was returned and Boit wrote in his journal that although the man "richy deserved" punishment Boit understood why he would want to stay in Hawaii, and that he could only threaten him, "not having the heart to flog the poor illiterate devil".

Boit left the Hawaiian Islands for Canton on 17 October 1795, arriving in the Pearl River Delta area in early December. With the mandatory help of a local pilot he took the Union first to Macau, then up the Pearl River to Whampoa anchorage near Canton. The Union remained there until 12 January 1796, during which time he overhauled the Union and sold his furs and bought Chinese goods. He also took on some French freight and a French passenger wanting passage to Mauritius.

Boit sailed the Union from China on 13 January 1796. He sailed south through the South China Sea to Sunda Strait, arriving in late January. The Union entered the strait with a convoy on January 31 and struggled with adverse winds and contrary tides until February 9, when the sloop made it to the open Indian Ocean. After sailing across the ocean Boit reached the island of Mauritius, arriving on 14 March 1796 and staying until March 29. Continuing on, Boit sailed around the Cape of Good Hope in April.

On 8 July 1796 the Union arrived back in Boston. Two weeks later it was sold.

Union was the first sloop of her size and rig to sail around the world. Upon return Boit wrote in his journal "I believe the Union was the first sloop that ever circumnavigated the globe."

== See also ==
- List of historical ships in British Columbia
