= Cloak Bay =

Bay in British Columbia, Canada

Coordinates: 54°12′30″N 133°1′8″W

Cloak Bay is a bay in Haida Gwaii, British Columbia, Canada. It is located on the west side of Langara Island, between Langara and Graham Island, at the northwestern end of Haida Gwaii. It adjoins Parry Passage, the strait between Langara and Graham Island. There are several islands in Cloak Bay, the largest being Cox Island. Indian Reserves on or near Cloak Bay include Guoyskun 22, on the north side of Cloak Bay, and Kioosta 15, on Parry Passage. The historic Haida village of Kiusta is the main settlement in the area.

The Spanish explorer Juan Pérez was the first European to visit the area of Cloak Bay. He reached the area in July 1774 and met with a group of Haida near the northwest tip of Langara Island.

During the early contact era there were a number of villages on or near Cloak Bay, including Kiusta, Dadens, Yaku, Ta, Chaahl, Chief Cuneah of Kiusta had influence over the region during the maritime fur trade era. Other chiefs, such as Eldarge, Cowe, Skilkada, and Shakes, were secondary to Cuneah.

Cloak Bay was given its name by the maritime fur trader George Dixon on 3 July 1787, for the large number of beautiful sea otter cloaks he obtained in trade in the area. Many other maritime fur traders visited Cloak Bay and the Haida villages of the area. In 1789 Robert Gray acquired 300 prime sea otter skins for one crude iron chisel each, a bargain that Gray bragged about. The Haida of the area soon learned and began demanding far higher prices. Before long the furs from Cloak Bay were among the most expensive, although it remained an important trading site for decades. Other early traders who visited Cloak Bay include William Douglas in 1789, John Boit of the Union, in 1795, Charles Bishop of the Ruby, in 1795, and many others.
