= John Boit =

18th-century American maritime fur trader

John Boit Jr.
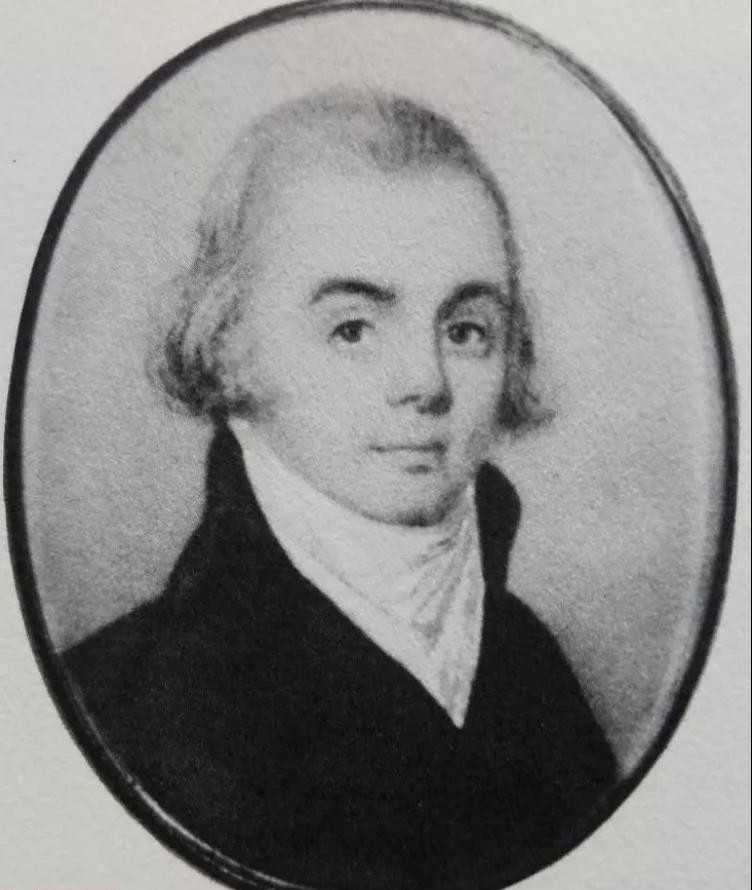
- Boit in a 1795 publication
- Born: 15 October 1774; Boston, Massachusetts
- Died: March 8, 1829 (aged 54); Boston, Massachusetts
- Occupations: Maritime fur trader, merchant
- Known for: Officer on Columbia Rediviva, captain of Union
- Parent(s): John Boit Sr. and Sarah Brown Boit

John Boit Jr. (15 October 1774 – 8 March 1829) was one of the first Americans involved in the maritime fur trade. He sailed as fifth mate under Captain Robert Gray on the second voyage of the Columbia Rediviva, 1790–1793. During the voyage he wrote a short but important journal in which he described the first time the Columbia River was located by Europeans or European Americans. From 1794 to 1796 he captained the Union on another maritime fur trading circumnavigation voyage from New England to the Pacific Northwest and China. Later he captained other vessels including the George and the slave ship Mac.

== Early life and family ==
John Boit Jr. was born on 15 October 1774 to John Boit Sr. and Sarah Brown Boit, both of Boston.

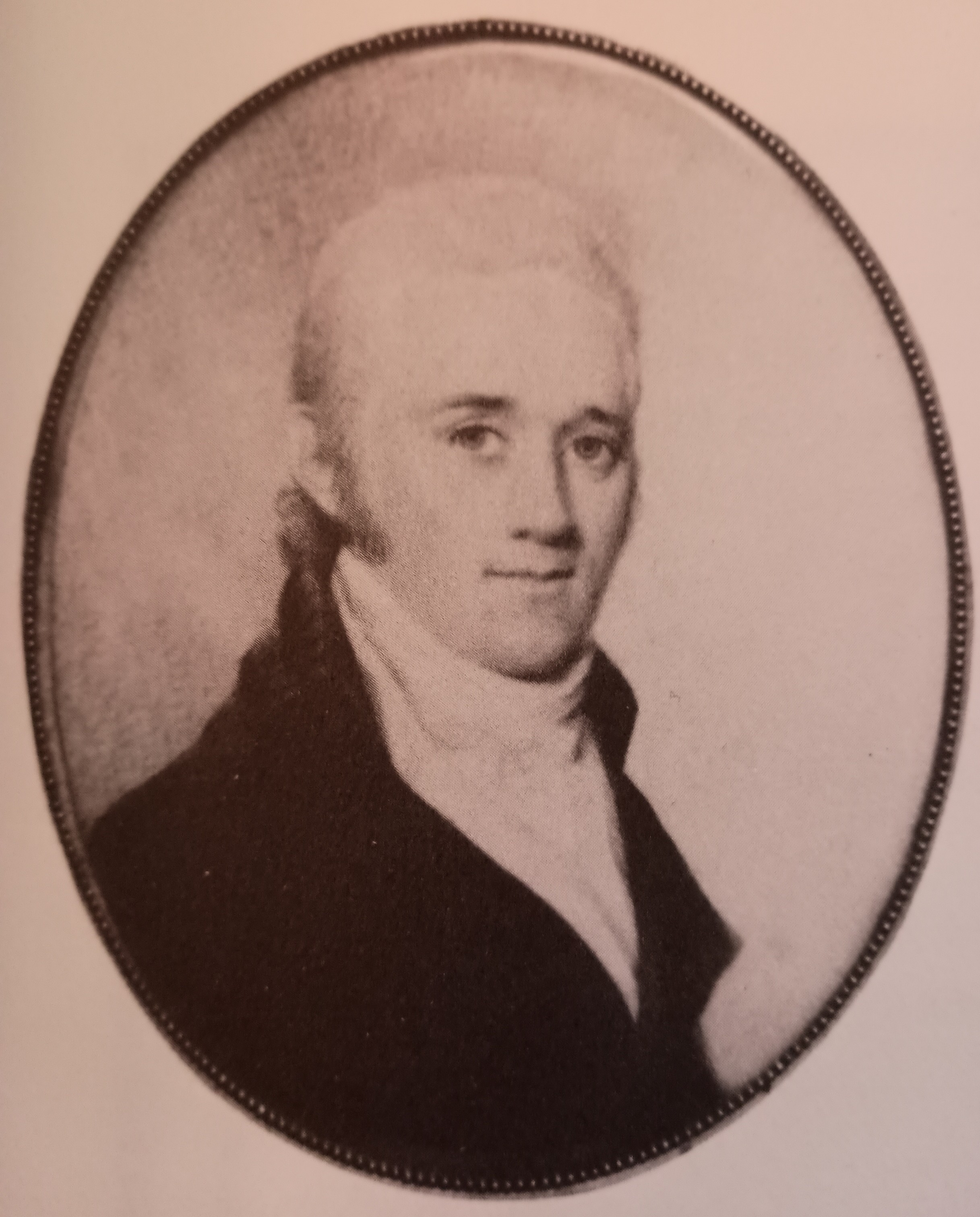
John Boit Sr.

John Boit Sr. was a "West India merchant" who came to Boston from England. The West Indies were at the time an integral part of the transatlantic slave trade and the French, British, Spanish, Danish, and Dutch all operated plantations in the region to produce goods, such as sugar, for export. Boit Sr. is documented as having been at a March 23, 1772 Boston Caucus meeting along with John Adams, Samuel Adams, and Paul Revere. He is also on record at a November 3, 1773 Boston Caucus meeting discussing how to respond to the imposition of tea taxes by the British that preceded the Boston Tea Party. Boit Sr. is mentioned in a May 2, 1775 letter to Paul Revere from his wife Rachel, when he was prevented from returning home from his "midnight ride" due to the siege of Boston in the aftermath of the Battles of Lexington and Concord. He is accused of not paying his fair share of taxes by a group of Boston residents in an August 18, 1777 meeting of the Boston Board of Selectmen, saying:

It is our Opinion that the following Persons, Inhabitants of other Towns in this or the Neighboring States out to be taxed here, for the Real Estate, they occupy and the Business they do here, it being agreeable to Law--Vizt: Mr Archibald Mercer, William Eskine, Henry Mitchell, ------ Blair, Mess. Henry Livingston, John Boit.

Robert A. Boit, Boit's grandson, concludes that Boit's grandfather was Jacque Boit, a Huguenot of Normandy who fled to England as part of a wave of Huguenot emigration from France following the 1685 revocation of the Edict of Nantes.

Robert Boit also states that Boit likely would have gone to Boston Latin School when it was located adjacent to King's Chapel.

== Second voyage of the Columbia Rediviva, 1790-1793 ==
Boit was brother-in-law to Crowell Hatch, one of the primary investors in the Columbia expeditions. On September 28, 1790, at the age of 15, Boit set sail on Columbia as its fifth mate under Captain Robert Gray on what would be his first circumnavigation of the globe. They traded tools, trinkets, and various other items for sea otter pelts obtained from indigenous peoples of the northwest coast of North America, which in turn were traded for goods at Canton, China. These were then sold in the United States. His log of the expedition is the only complete account of the second voyage of Columbia, and only one of two written accounts of the first European Americans to locate what they would call the Columbia River on May 12, 1792, the other being the official log of Robert Gray. These accounts are the first written descriptions of Chinookan peoples and their first documented contact with Europeans or European Americans.

== Destruction of Opitsaht ==
Boit's Columbia logbook describes the events leading to the destruction of the Tla-o-qui-aht village of Opitsaht in Clayoquot Sound, on what is today known as Meares Island along the western coast of Vancouver Island. In September 1791, Columbia established its winter quarters at a location they called Adventure Cove, near present-day Columbia Islet. Here, they assembled the sloop Adventure using materials they brought from Boston and timbers harvested from the island, making it the first American ship ever built in the Pacific. During this period, they interacted with the Tla-o-qui-aht and Wickaninnish, who resided at Opitsaht. Many of their interactions were friendly, although Boit's logbook conveys a general attitude of distrust and a belief that they would all be murdered by the Tla-o-qui-aht if the tribe got the chance.

On March 25, 1792, Boit relates finding the village of Opitsaht deserted, with the tribe having gone to what is now called Wickaninnish Island. On the 27th, he writes:

I am sorry to be under the necessity of remarking that this day I was sent with three boats, all well man'd and arm'd, to destroy the Village of Opitsatah. it was a Command I was in no ways tenacious off, and am greived to think Capt. Gray shou'd let his passions go so far. This Village was about a half a mile in Diameter, and Contained upwards off 200 Houses, generally well built for Indians. ev'ry door that you enter'd was in resemblance to an human and Beasts head, the passage being through the mouth, besides which there was much more rude carved work about the dwellings some of which was by no means innelegant. This fine Village, the Work of Ages, was in short time totally destroy'd.

This is the only account of this incident, and no instigating factors immediately preceding the destruction of the village are mentioned by Boit. He was 17 years old at the time.

In 2005, William Twombly, a descendant of Robert Gray, apologized to the Tla-o-qui-aht people in a reconciliation ceremony.

== Voyage of the Union, 1794–1796 ==
Shortly after the Columbia returned to Boston John Boit was given command of the sloop Union for another maritime fur trading voyage to the Pacific Northwest and China. The sloop was owned by three investors including Boit's brother-in-law Crowell Hatch, who had also been an investor in the two voyages of Columbia Rediviva, under Robert Gray and John Kendrick.

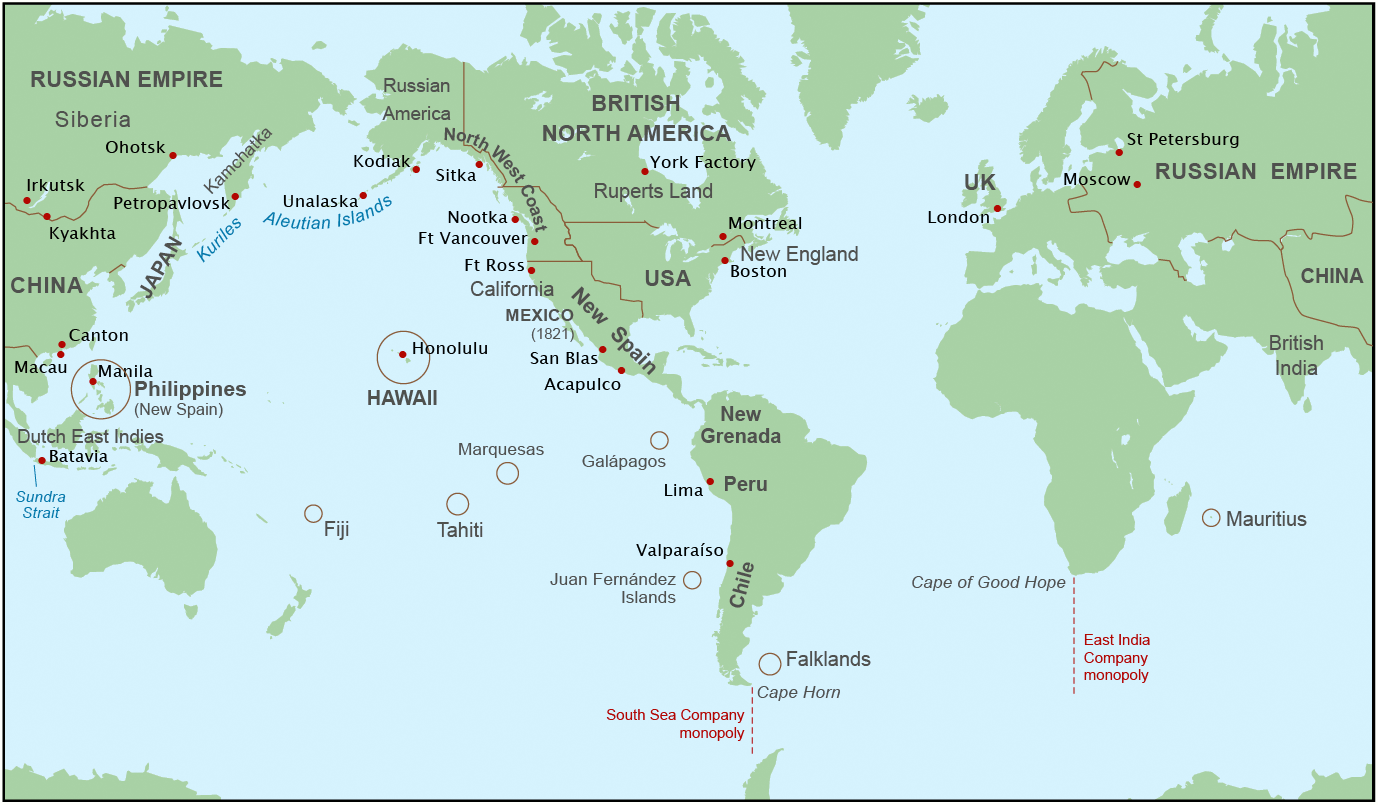
Maritime Fur Trade era, circa 1790 to 1840

Boit sailed Union from Newport, Rhode Island, on 1 August 1794. He passed the Cape Verde Islands without stopping in October. The Falkland Islands were reached near the end of the year. Boit remained in the Falklands for about three weeks before leaving on 23 January 1795. Rounding Cape Horn the Union reached its southernmost latitude on 4 February 1795.

On 16 May 1795 he arrived at Columbia Cove, Nasparti Inlet, on the west coast of Vancouver Island near Brooks Peninsula. He had been there three years before with Captain Gray on Columbia. After acquiring all the sea otter he could, he sailed south to Nootka Sound.

From Nootka Sound, he sailed north to Haida Gwaii to trade with the native Haida for sea otter furs. After trading with the Haida in the vicinity of Houston Stewart Channel and the village of Ninstints the Union cruised north up the eastern side of Haida Gwaii to the vicinity of the village known as Cumshewa. Then he returned south to Ninstints and cruised up the western side of Haida Gwaii until reaching the northern end in June, 1795. Boit traded with the Haida of Chief Cuneah in the area near Cloak Bay, Langara Island, and villages such as Dadens and Kiusta. On June 21, 1795, while off the western coast of Kunghit Island, Boit wrote:

Calm & pleasant, above 40 canoes came into the cove full of indians (at least 30 men each). I immediately suspected by their numbers that they meant to attack the Union. Called all hands to quarters; eight cheifs [sic] were on board at this time who began to be very saucy & the war canoes kept pressing alongside & the indians getting upon the nettings. Skoich-eye, the head cheif [sic] began the attack by seizing Mr. Hudson the second officer at the same time the indians alongside attempted to board with the Most hideous yells. However we paid them for their temerity & killed their first cheif [sic] Skoich-eye in the 2nd mate's arms while they was struggling together. I dispatched him with a bayonet. The rest of the cheif [sic] on deck was knock'd down & wounded & we kill'd from the nettings & in the canoes alongside above 40 more when they retreated, at which time I could have kill'd 100 more with grape shot but I let humanity prevail & ceas'd firing.

Then Boit sailed the Union south to the Strait of Juan de Fuca, the Columbia River, and Tillamook Bay, again trading for sea otter furs. For nine days he attempted to enter the Columbia River. But the weather was against him and he nearly lost the Union on the dangerous Columbia Bar before giving up in disappointment.

From Tillamook Bay Boit sailed north again, stopping briefly at Nootka Sound. By August, 1795, Union was again cruising the southeast coast of Haida Gwaii and the west coast of Vancouver Island.

On 12 September 1795 Boit, having finished his fur trading, sailed from Columbia Cove, making for the Hawaiian Islands and Guangzhou (Canton), China.

Boit reached Hawaii on 12 October 1795. On 16 October, along the north coast of the Island of Hawaii, he met John Young, a British–American sailor who had been left on the island by Simon Metcalfe in 1790. Young had become an important advisor to the Hawaiian King Kamehameha I and frequently met with and assisted visiting ships. Young told Boit a great deal of information about the situation in the island, of other ships that had visited and other trading captains, including accounts of the death of John Kendrick, and of Simon Metcalfe and his son Thomas Metcalfe. Boit wrote a very long journal entry describing all the things he had learned from Young. This entry is now a vital primary source account about a variety of topics.

Boit offered to take Young to Canton, but Young declined, saying that his situation in Hawaii was far better than a common sailor like himself could ever hope to achieve anywhere else in the world. When Young left the Union late that night he discovered one of Boit's crew hiding in his canoe, having hoped to stay in Hawaii. The crewmember was returned and Boit wrote in his journal that although the man "richy deserved" punishment Boit understood why he would want to stay in Hawaii, and that he could only threaten him, "not having the heart to flog the poor illiterate devil".

Boit left the Hawaiian Islands for Canton on 17 October 1795, arriving in the Pearl River Delta area in early December. With the mandatory help of a local pilot he took the Union first to Macau, then up the Pearl River to Whampoa anchorage near Canton. The Union remained there until 12 January 1796, during which time he overhauled the Union and sold his furs and bought Chinese goods. He also took on some French freight and a French passenger wanting passage to Mauritius.

Boit sailed the Union from China on 13 January 1796. He sailed south through the South China Sea to Sunda Strait, arriving in late January. The Union entered the strait with a convoy on January 31 and struggled with adverse winds and contrary tides until February 9, when the sloop made it to the open Indian Ocean. After sailing across the ocean Boit reached the island of Mauritius, arriving on 14 March 1796 and staying until March 29. Continuing on, Boit sailed around the Cape of Good Hope in April.

On 8 July 1796 the Union arrived back in Boston. Two weeks later it was sold.

Union was the first sloop of her size and rig to sail around the world. Upon return Boit wrote in his journal "I believe the Union was the first sloop that ever circumnavigated the globe."

== Relationship with Chow Manderien ==
In the summer of 1796, Boit left Boston harbor as captain of the snow George, also partially owned by Crowell Hatch, on a voyage to the Isle of France (Mauritius) in the Indian Ocean. The ship suffered from significant leaking and was sold after arriving at its destination. In his logbook, Boit wrote:

Took a house on shore, attended by my faithful servant Chou (a Chinese)--kept Bachelor's hall--and in the gay life that is generally pursued by young men on this island passed a few months away in quite an agreeable though dissipated manner.

It is often stated that Boit first met Chow, a teenage boy, in China as captain of the Union. However, there is no reference to Chow in Boit's Union logbooks, casting doubt on this claim. Indeed, another source identifies Mauritius as the location where Boit and Chow met. Chow returned with Boit to Boston as his servant. On September 11, 1798, Chow was working on a mast of the Mac when he fell to his death. Boit paid for a headstone for Chow in Boston's Central Burying Ground, and had inscribed the following:

Here lies interred the Body of CHOW MANDERIEN a native of China. Aged 19 years, whose death was occasioned on the 11th Sept. 1798, by a fall from the Mast head of the Ship Mac of Boston. This stone is erected to his Memory by his affectionate Master JOHN BOIT Junr.

It is claimed that Chow's name would now be written as Zhou Libei. He is believed to be the first person of Chinese descent to have lived, died, and been buried in the United States, and he is still honored and celebrated by the Chinese-American community in Boston.

== Marriage and slave voyage of the Mac, 1798-1799 ==
In November 1798, two months after Chow's death, Boit set sail from Boston as captain of the Mac. He told his crew that they were headed toward Cape Verde, but in fact he was heading for the African continent, where he obtained 270 enslaved Africans. They arrived in Havana, Cuba on May 31, 1799, and sold all but 50 people who died on the voyage.

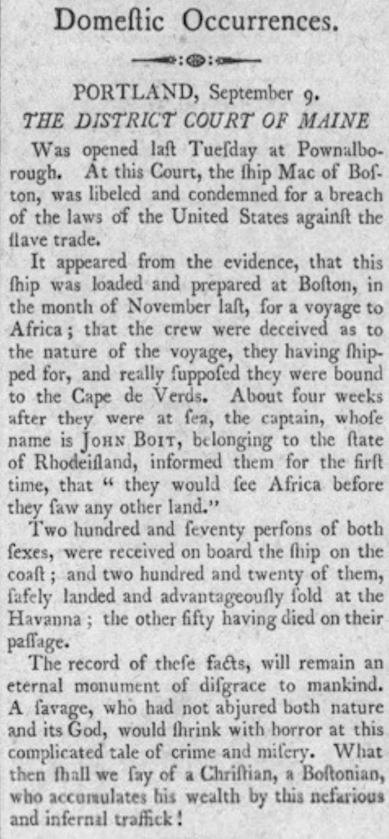
The original Lancaster Intelligencer article describing the trial against John Boit on charges of violating federal laws against the slave trade.

Not long after arriving back in the United States, Boit married Eleanor Jones on August 20, 1799, in Newport, Rhode Island. Two weeks later, he was tried for violating federal laws against the slave trade. On September 9, 1799, the Lancaster Intelligencer published the following:

Domestic Occurrences.

PORTLAND, September 9. THE DISTRICT COURT OF MAINE Was opened last Tuesday at Pownalborough. At this Court, the ship Mac of Boston, was libeled and condemned for a breach of the laws of the United States against the slave trade.

It appeared from the evidence, that this ship was loaded and prepared at Boston, in the month of November last, for a voyage to Africa; that the crew were deceived as to the nature of the voyage, they having shipped for, and really supposed they were bound to the Cape de Verds. About four weeks after they were at sea, the captain, whose name is JOHN BOIT, belonging to the state of Rhodeisland, informed them for the first time, that "they would see Africa before they saw any other land."

Two hundred and seventy persons of both sexes, were received on board the ship on the coast; and two hundred and twenty of them, safely landed and advantageously sold at the Havanna; the other fifty having died on their passage.

The record of the facts, will remain an eternal monument of disgrace to mankind. A savage, who had not abjured both nature and its God, would shrink with horror at this complicated tale of crime and misery. What then shall we say of a Christian, a Bostonian, who accumulates his wealth by this nefarious and infernal traffick!

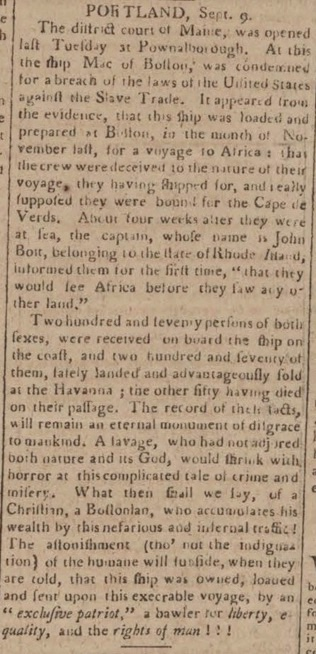
A reprint of the Lancaster Intelligencer article in the October 7, 1799 Delaware and Eastern-Shore Advertiser.

This article was reprinted in the October 7, 1799 edition of the Delaware & Eastern-Shore Advertiser, which added, "The astonishment (tho' not the indignation) of the humane will subside, when they are told, that this ship was owned, loaded, and sent upon this execrable voyage, by an 'exclusive patriot,' a bawler for liberty, equality, and the rights of man ! ! !"

Other sources claim that the voyage transported 244 enslaved Africans at the only 206 survived. This voyage is Voyage ID 13807 on the Slave Voyages database. Notably, this record names the ship's captain as "John Best," but other details of the record closely match descriptions of the Mac in the press at the time.

Boit's voyage would have violated the Slave Trade Act of 1794. Mac was seized and sold at auction in Bath, Maine in October 1799.

The occurrence of this slave voyage seems to have escaped notice of historians of the early maritime fur traders. In his 1915 family history, Robert Apthorp Boit makes clear his knowledge of the Mac in his discussion of Chou, but if he had any knowledge of the nature of the ship's voyage, he does not divulge it. In his 1941 introduction to Voyages of the "Columbia" to the Northwest Coast, 1787-1790 & 1790-1793, Frederic W. Howay claims there is a "gap in Boit's story" between his return from the Isle of France in November 1797 and his marriage to Eleanor Jones in August 1799. Edmund Hayes relies heavily on Howay's history in his narrative of Boit's life in 1981's Log of the Union, and makes no mention of the Mac.

On February 28, 2020, food blogger Richard Auffrey detailed the story of Chou and the occurrence of Boit's slave voyage with the Mac in a blog post about the history of Boston's earliest Chinese residents.

== Later life ==
After the voyage of the Mac John Boit captained various other ships, such as the 600-ton Mount Hope. When he was 40 years old he gave up being a ship captain and became a Boston merchant with a focus on shipping interests. He lived in Boston for the rest of his life, dying on 8 March 1829. He was buried at King's Chapel Burying Ground, Boston.

== Legacy ==
Boit Rock, in front of Columbia Cove at the entrance to Nasparti Inlet, Checleset Bay, northwest of Kyuquot Sound, on the west coast of Vancouver Island, was named for John Boit.

Boit is one of 158 historical figures whose names are inscribed on the walls of the legislative chambers of the Oregon State Capitol.

John Boit is the grandfather of Edward Darley Boit Jr., whose four daughters were depicted in their Paris apartment in John Singer Sargent's well-known work The Daughters of Edward Darley Boit. This piece is displayed at the Museum of Fine Arts, Boston.

Boit's logbooks are archived by the Massachusetts Historical Society in Boston.

== See also ==
- List of ships in British Columbia
