= Parry Passage =

Coordinates: 54°10′47″N 132°59′46″W

Parry Passage is a strait and marine waterway between Langara Island (N) and Graham Island (S) in Haida Gwaii, formerly known as the Queen Charlotte Islands, in British Columbia, Canada.

== Name origin and history ==
Also called Parry Channel, the passage was named for William E. Parry, the explorer.

The passage was named in 1953 by Commander James Prevost of HMS Virago, after W.E. Parry, a close friend. It had been previously named Cox's Channel after one of the backers of Iphigenia, commanded by William Douglas in the area in 1788–1789. Joseph Ingraham in 1791–1792 named it "Cunneyah's Streights" [sic] after the chief of nearby Kiusta. Jacinto Caamano named it Puerto de Floridablanca in 1792 after the Conde de Floridablanca.

The first detailed survey of the passage was in 1791 by Captain Etienne Marchand of La Solide.

The Haida village of Dadens was located on the south end of Langara Island, facing the passage.

== See also ==
- Parry (disambiguation)
