= Parry =

Parry may refer to:

== People ==
- Parry (surname)
- Parry (given name)

== Fictional characters ==
- Parry, protagonist of the movie The Fisher King, played by Robin Williams
- Parry in the series Incarnations of Immortality by Piers Anthony
- The Hero's son in Dragon Quest V

== Places ==
=== Canada ===
- Parry, Saskatchewan, a hamlet
- Cape Parry, Northwest Territories
- Parry Peninsula, Northwest Territories
- Parry Channel, Nunavut
- Parry Sound, Georgian Bay, Ontario
- Parry Island in Georgian Bay, Ontario; see Wasauksing First Nation
- Parry Islands, former name of the Queen Elizabeth Islands
- Parry Passage, between Langara and Graham Islands, Haida Gwaii, British Columbia

=== Elsewhere ===
- Parry Peak, a part of the Rocky Mountains, in Colorado, United States
- Parry County, New South Wales, Australia
- Mount Parry, Antarctica
- Parry Point, Coats Land, Antarctica
- Parry Island, part of Enewetak Atoll in the Pacific Ocean
- Parry (crater), on the Moon

== Other uses ==
- Parry (fencing), a maneuver in fencing
- PARRY, a simulation program in artificial intelligence
- Parry People Movers, a British manufacturer of lightweight trams and railcars
- Parry Auto Company, an early, short-lived American manufacturer
- Parry House (disambiguation), various houses on the US National Register of Historic Places
- Parry Field, a defunct baseball stadium in Belmont, Western Australia
- EID Parry, a public company in South India

== See also ==
- Perry (disambiguation)
- Parry Pinyon, a kind of pine tree
- Penstemon parryi or Parry's Penstemon, a perennial flowering shrub
- Graves' disease, also known as Parry's disease
