= Maritime fur trade =

Ship-based fur trade system

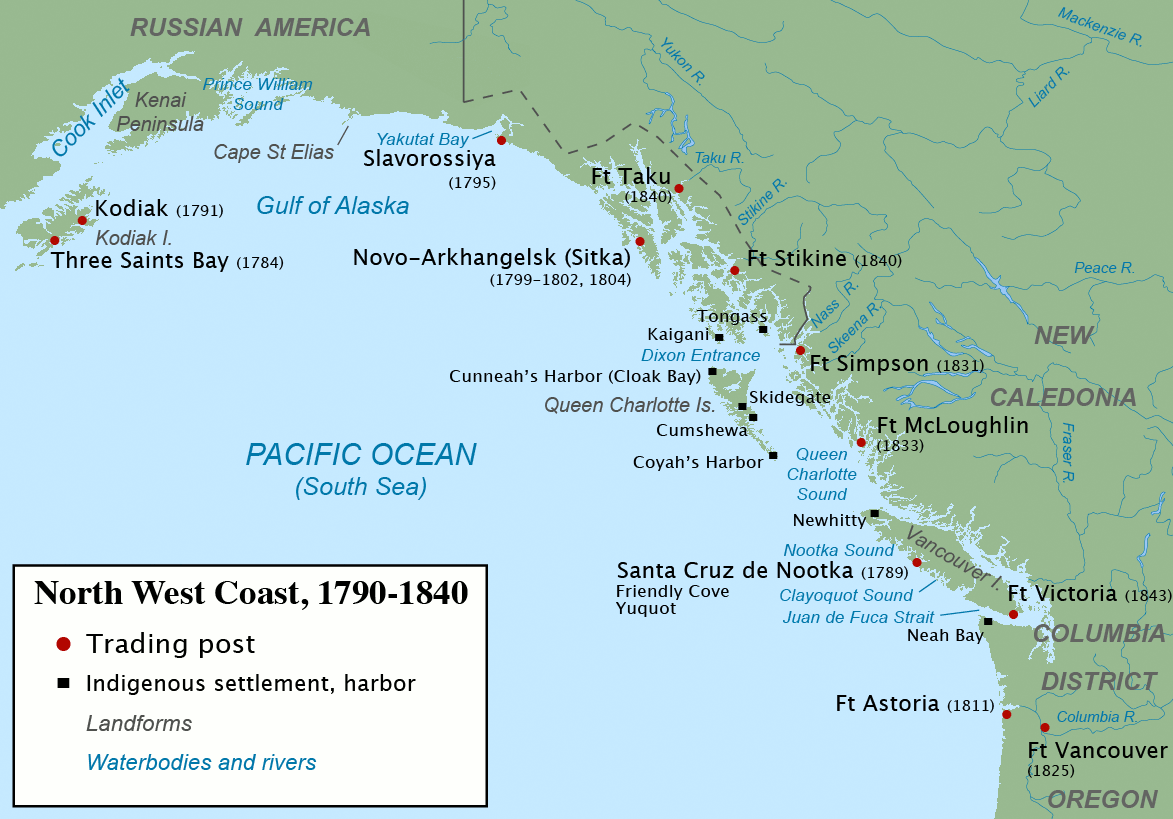
The North West Coast during the maritime fur trade era, about 1790 to 1840

The maritime fur trade (historically called the North West trade), a ship-based fur trade system, focused largely on acquiring furs of sea otters and other animals from the Indigenous peoples of the Pacific Northwest Coast and Alaska Natives. Entrepreneurs also exploited fur-bearing skins from the wider Pacific and the Southern Ocean. The trade mostly serviced the market in Qing China, which imported furs and exported tea, silks, porcelain, and other Chinese goods to Europe and the United States.

The trade was pioneered by the Russians. Through the Siberian fur trade, they reached the Pacific in the 17th century, then moved eastward, reaching the Alaska Peninsula by the 1760s. The Spanish began trading in 1774, the British in 1778, and the Americans in 1788. Russians controlled the Alaskan coast during this era. The coast further south saw fierce competition between British and American traders. The British were the first to operate in the southern sector, but the Americans dominated from the 1790s to the 1830s. Once the British Hudson's Bay Company (HBC) entered the trade in the 1820s, they outcompeted the Americans by about 1840. Thereafter, the HBC and the Russian-American Company (RAC) dominated operations. The trade in fur-seal skins from the Southern Ocean peaked in the 1810s and was unprofitable due to overexploitation by 1863.

The trade linked the Pacific Northwest coast to China, Hawaii, Britain, and the United States. A rapid increase of wealth occurred among the indigenous population, along with increased warfare, potlatching, slaving, and depopulation due to epidemic disease. The importance of totems and traditional nobility crests increased, and the Chinook Jargon was developed. In the Southern Hemisphere, expeditions of sealers led Europeans to settle in the previously ignored Tasmania and New Zealand. Profits from the trade helped revitalize New England through industrial development, especially textile manufacturing, which contributed to its transformation from an agrarian to an industrial society.

The most profitable furs came from sea otter pelts, which were fashionable in China, Europe and America. Aleut hunters supplied Russians sea-otter skins as tribute or ransom. Despite an estimated population of 150,000-300,000 and a range from Japan to Mexico in the pre-trade years, sea otters' slow breeding made them vulnerable to excessive hunting, which almost caused their extinction. The sea otter remains endangered today.

While Russians focused on sea otter pelts, societies from eastern North America gradually moved their largely beaver-based fur-harvesting enterprises further westward. From 1792 onwards, the beaver trade began to tap into the Chinese market in addition to their Atlantic markets. The fur trade's killing of beavers proved devastating. Populations took centuries to recover in some areas, while others never recovered. Ecosystems that relied on beavers for dams, water and other vital needs faced ecological destruction, environmental change, and drought. This affected many species living in the Pacific Northwest, including otters, fish, and bears.

== Origins ==
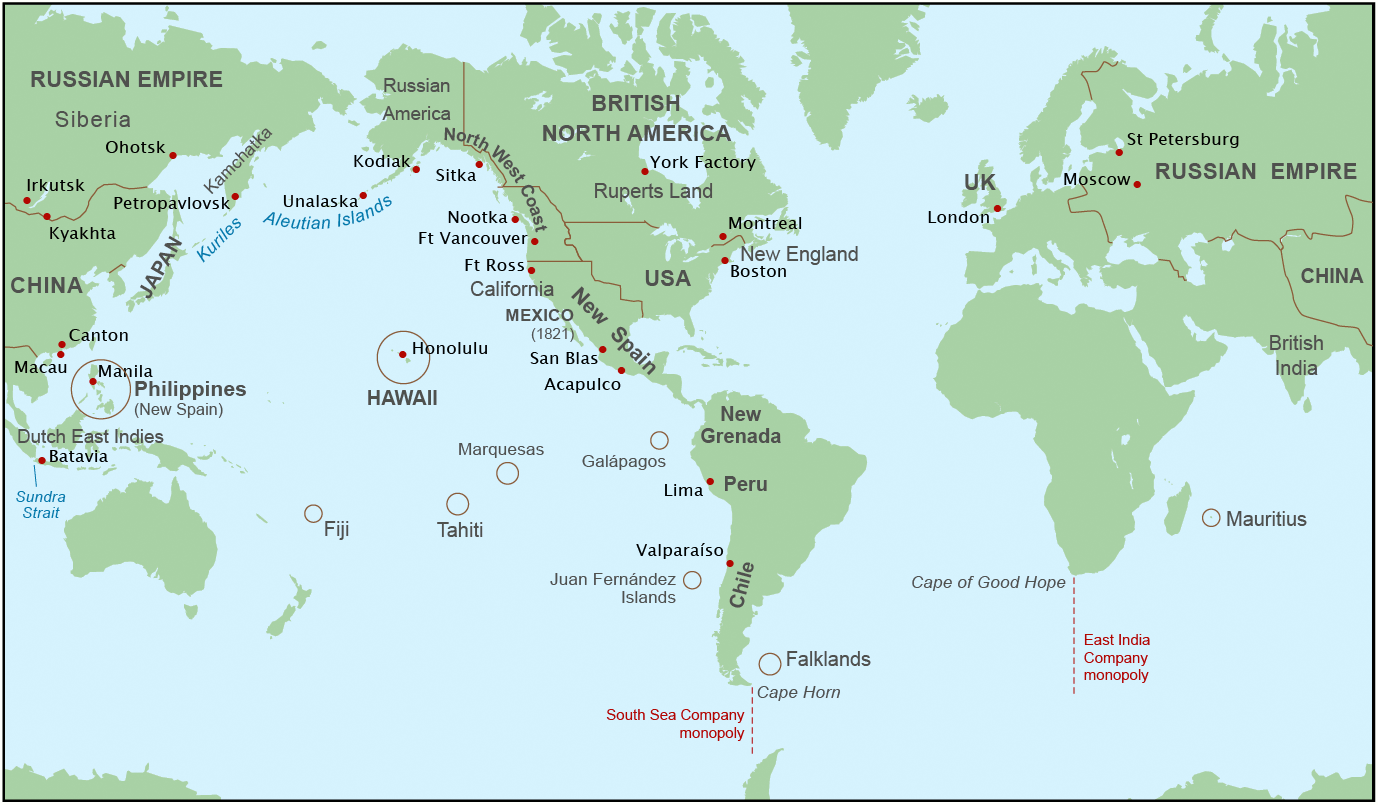
The Maritime fur trade system within a global context, 1790 to 1840

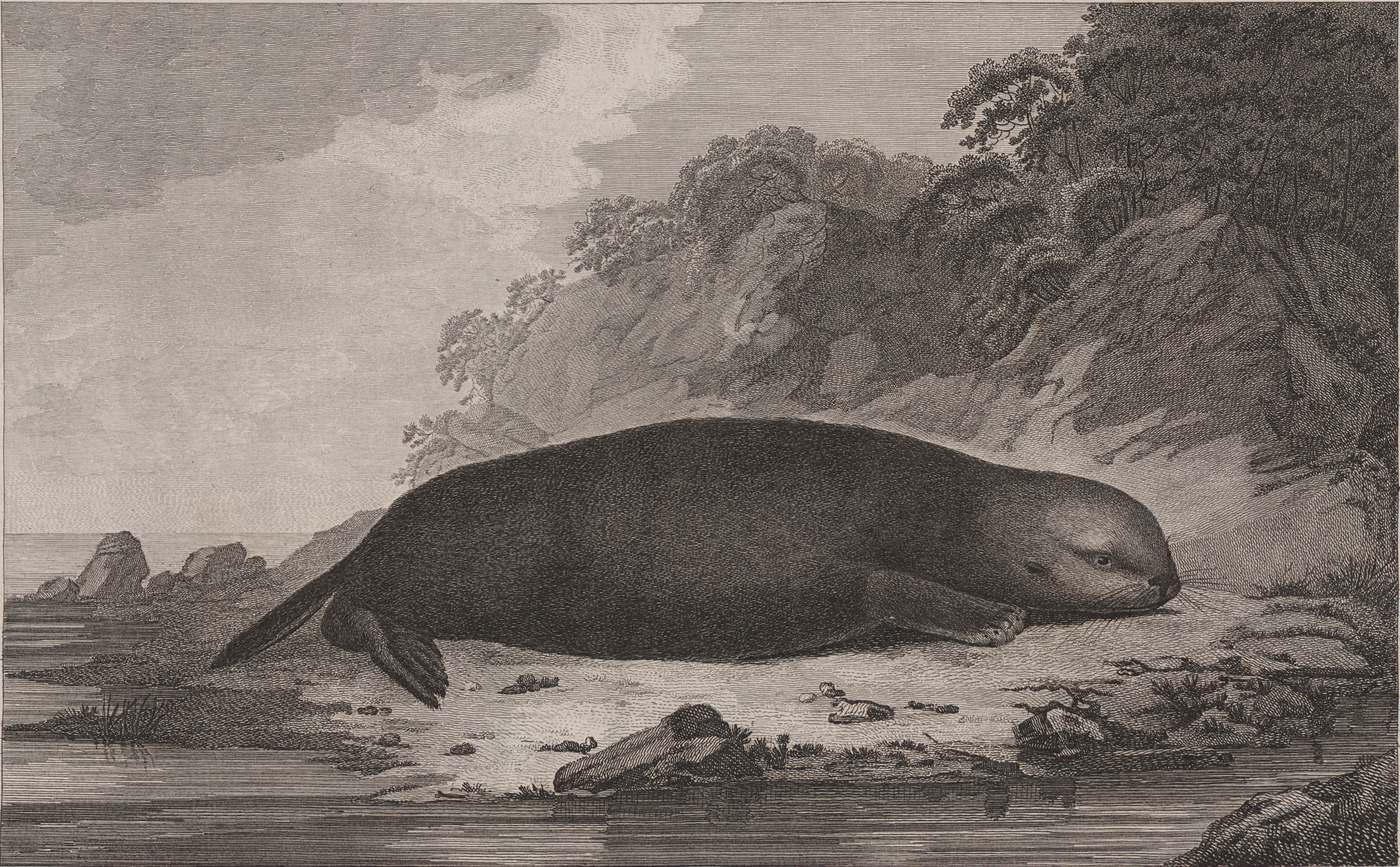
A sea otter, drawing by S. Smith after John Webber

Modern and historical ranges of sea otter subspecies

The Pacific Northwest was one of the last significant nonpolar regions in the world to be explored by Europeans. Centuries of reconnaissance and conquest had brought the rest of North America within the claims of imperial powers. During the late 18th and early 19th centuries, a number of empires and commercial systems converged upon the Northwest Coast, by sea as well as by land across the continent. The Russian and Spanish empires were extended into the region simultaneously, from opposite directions. Russian fur companies expanded into North America along the Aleutian Islands, reaching the Fox Islands and the Alaska Peninsula in the early 1760s. Stepan Glotov encountered Kodiak Island in 1763. In 1768, an expedition was carried out by the Russian Navy, under Pyotr Krenitsyn and Mikhail Levashev. Two ships sailed from Kamchatka to the Alaska Peninsula for the purpose of assessing the existing Russian activity and the possibilities of future development. Reports about the voyage, meant to be kept secret, spread through Europe and caused alarm in Spain. The Spanish government, already concerned about Russian activity in Alaska, decided to colonize Alta California and sent exploratory voyages to Alaska to assess the threat and strengthen Spanish claims of sovereignty on the coast north of Mexico.

The province of Alta California was established by José de Gálvez in 1769, just as the Krenitsyn-Levashev expedition was concluding. Five separate expeditions were dispatched to Alta California in 1769. By 1782, presidios had been established at San Diego, Monterey, San Francisco and Santa Barbara, linked by a series of mission stations along the coast. Spanish exploration voyages to the far north were launched in 1774, 1775, and 1779. In 1784, the center of Russian activity shifted east to Kodiak Island and hunting operations were extended into Cook Inlet. The two empires seemed destined to clash, but before direct Russian-Spanish contact was made new powers appeared on the Northwest Coast—Britain and the United States. When the clash came, at Nootka Sound in 1789, it was not between Spain and Russia but between Spain and Britain. The British first reached the region by sea in 1778, during James Cook's third voyage, and by land in 1793, when Alexander Mackenzie's transcontinental explorations reached the Pacific. The first British maritime fur trader, James Hanna, arrived on the Northwest Coast in 1785. The first American traders, John Kendrick and Robert Gray, arrived by sea in 1788. The Lewis and Clark Expedition arrived overland in 1805.

The early maritime fur traders were explorers, as well as traders. The Northwest Coast is very complex — a "labyrinth of waters", according to George Simpson— with thousands of islands, numerous straits and fjords, and a mountainous, rocky, and often very steep shoreline. Navigational hazards included persistent rain, high winds, thick fogs, strong currents, and tides, and hidden rocks. Wind patterns were often contrary, variable, and baffling, especially within the coastal straits and archipelagoes, which makes sailing dangerous. Early explorations before the maritime fur trade era—by Juan Pérez, Bruno de Heceta, Bogeda y Quadra, and James Cook—produced only rough surveys of the coast's general features. Detailed surveys were undertaken in only a few relatively small areas, such as Nootka Sound, Bucareli Bay, and Cook Inlet. Russian exploration before 1785 had produced mainly rough surveys, largely restricted to the Aleutian Islands and mainland Alaska west of Cape Saint Elias. British and American maritime fur traders began visiting the Northwest Coast in 1785, at which time it was mostly unexplored. Although noncommercial exploration voyages continued, especially by the Spanish Navy, the maritime fur traders made a number of significant discoveries. Notable examples include the Strait of Juan de Fuca, Clayoquot Sound, and Barkley Sound, all found by Charles William Barkley, Queen Charlotte Strait by James Strange, Fitz Hugh Sound by James Hanna, Grays Harbor and the Columbia River by Robert Gray. George Dixon explored the Dixon Entrance and was the first to realize that Haida Gwaii was not part of the mainland.

=== Russia ===
Russian maritime fur trading in the northern Pacific began after the exploration voyages of Vitus Bering and Aleksei Chirikov in 1741 and 1742. Their voyages demonstrated that Asia and North America were not connected but that sea voyages were feasible, and that the region was rich in furs. Private fur traders, mostly promyshlenniki, launched fur trading expeditions from Kamchatka, at first focusing on nearby islands such as the Commander Islands. Unlike fur trading ventures in Siberia, these maritime expeditions required more capital than most promyshlenniki could obtain. Merchants from cities such as Irkutsk, Tobolsk, and others in European Russia, became the principal investors.

An early trader, Emilian Basov, traded at Bering Island in 1743, collecting a large number of sea otter, fur seal, and blue Arctic fox furs. Basov made four trips to Bering Island and nearby Medny Island and made a fortune, inspiring many other traders. From 1743 to the founding of the Russian-American Company in 1799, over 100 private fur-trading and hunting voyages sailed from Kamchatka to North America. In total, these voyages garnered over eight million silver rubles. During the early part of this era, the ships would typically stop at the Commander Islands to slaughter and preserve the meat of Steller's sea cows, a defenseless sea mammal whose range was limited to those islands. They were hunted not only for food, but also for their skins, used to make boats, and their subcutaneous fat, used for oil lamps. By 1768, Steller's sea cow was extinct. As furs were depleted on nearby islands, Russian traders sailed farther east along the Aleutian chain. By the 1760s, they were regularly sailing to Kodiak Island. Notable Russian traders in the early years of the trade include Nikifor Trapeznikov (who financed and participated in 10 voyages between 1743 and 1768), Maksimovich Solov'ev, Stepan Glotov, and Grigory Shelikhov.

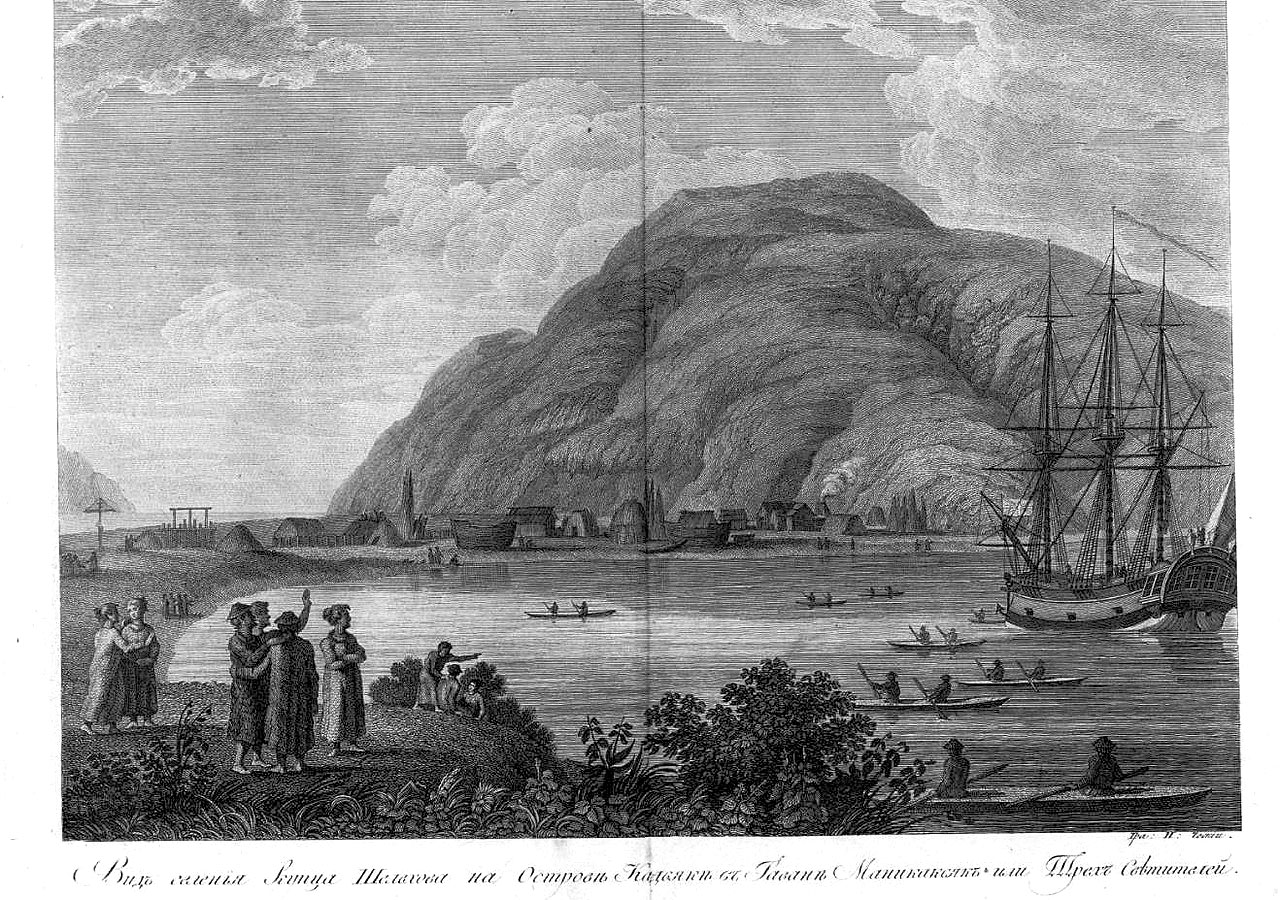
The settlement of Grigory Shelikhov on Kodiak Island

As traders sailed farther east, the voyages became longer and more expensive. Smaller enterprises were merged into larger ones. During the 1780s, Grigory Shelikhov began to stand out as one of the most important traders through the Shelikhov-Golikov Company. In 1784, Shelikhov founded the first permanent Russian settlement in North America, at Three Saints Bay on Kodiak Island. Shelikhov envisioned a continual extension of the Russian maritime fur trade, with trading posts being set up farther and farther along the coast all the way to California. He sought exclusive control of the trade, and in 1788 Empress Catherine II decided to grant his company a monopoly only over the area it already occupied. Other traders were free to compete elsewhere. Catherine's decision was issued as the imperial ukase (proclamation) of 28 September 1788.

By the time of Catherine's ukase of 1788, just as other nations were entering the maritime fur trade, the Russians had spent over 40 years establishing and expanding their maritime operations in North America. A number of colonies were being established over a large region stretching from the Aleutian Islands to Cook Inlet and Prince William Sound. Many ships sailed from Kamchatka to Alaska each year. The Russians not only had an early start, but they also controlled the habitats of the most valuable sea otters. The Kurilian, Kamchatkan, and Aleutian sea otters' fur was thicker, glossier, and blacker than those on the Northwest Coast and California. The four grades of fur were based on colour, texture, and thickness. The most prized furs were those of Kurilian and Kamchatkan sea otters, Aleutian furs were second-grade, those of the Northwest Coast third, and the poorest grade was those of Californian sea otters. Russia also controlled the sources of sable furs, the most valuable fur-bearing land mammal.

The Russian system differed from the British and American systems in its relationship with Indigenous peoples. Using the same method they had used in Siberia, the Russians employed or enserfed Aleut and Alutiiq people, the latter being a subgroup of the Yup'ik people. The Aleut and Alutiiq people were expert sea otter hunters, noted for their use of kayaks and baidarkas. Russian ships were mainly used for transporting and assisting Native hunting parties. This differed from the British and American system, where the Natives hunted sea otters and prepared the furs on their own, and were essentially independent agents of the fur trade. The Russians did not trade freely with the Native Alaskans; rather, they imposed a fur tribute known as yasak. The yasak system, which was widely used in Siberia, essentially enslaved the Natives. In 1788, it was banned in Russian America, only to be replaced by compulsory labor.

=== Britain ===
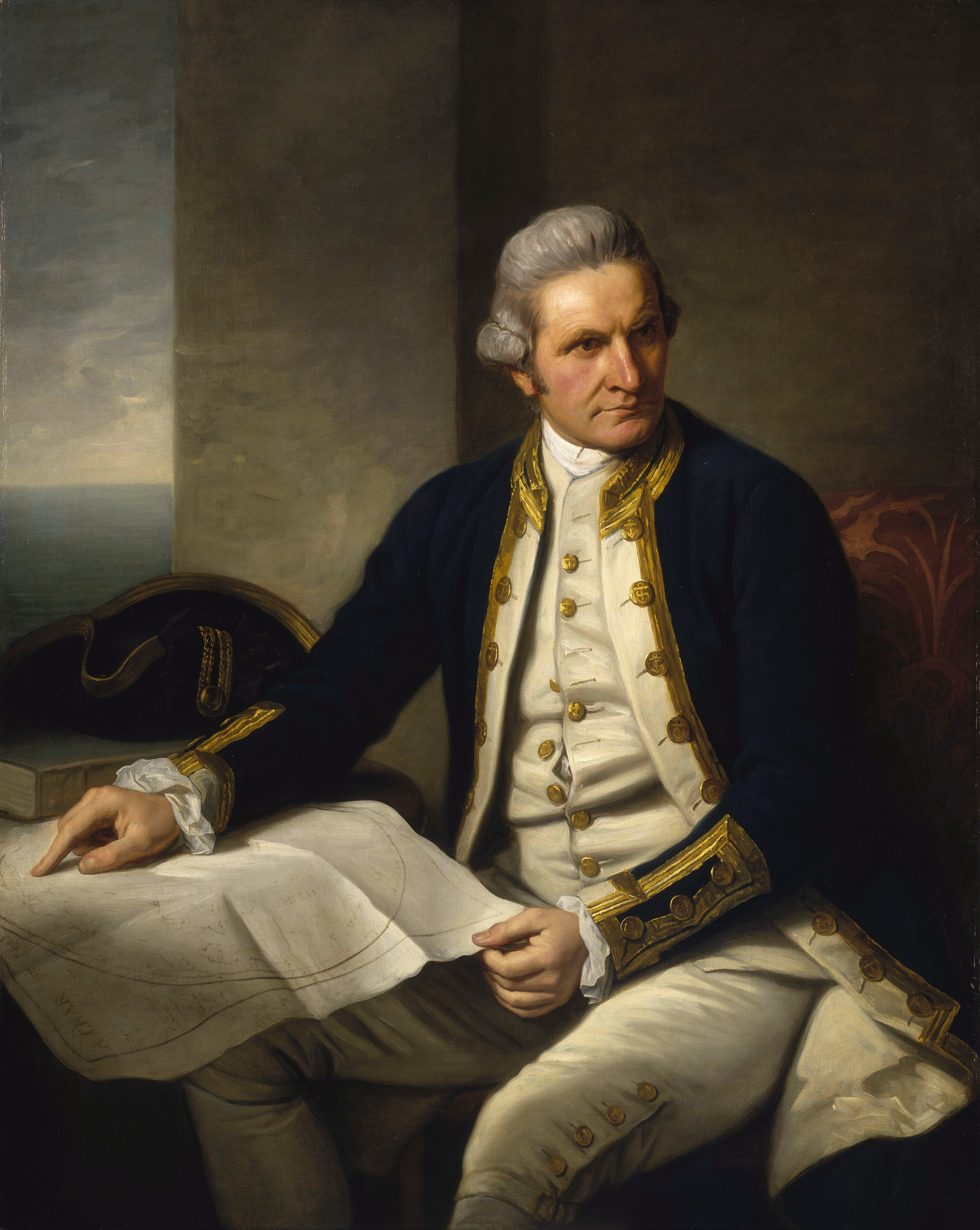
Captain James Cook

The British entry into the maritime fur trade dates to 1778 and the third voyage of Captain James Cook. While sailing north to search for the fabled Northwest Passage, Cook discovered the Hawaiian Islands. On the Northwest Coast, he spent a month in Nootka Sound, during which he and his crew traded with the Nuu-chah-nulth from the village of Yuquot. They ended up with over 300 furs, mostly sea otter, but thought them of no great value. Later, after Cook had been killed in Hawaii, the expedition visited Canton and were surprised by how much money the Chinese were willing to pay for the furs. A profit of 1,800% was made. James King, one of the commanders after Cook's death, wrote, "the advantages that might be derived from a voyage to that part of the American coast, undertaken with commercial views, appear to me of a degree of importance sufficient to call for the attention of the public." The crews of the two ships were so eager to return to Nootka Sound and acquire more furs, they were "not far short of mutiny". Nevertheless, they sailed for England, arriving there in October 1780. Accounts of Cook's voyage and the sea otter trade were published in the 1780s, triggering a rush of entrepreneurial voyages to the Northwest Coast.

British interest in the maritime fur trade peaked between 1785 and 1794, then declined as the French Revolutionary Wars diminished Britain's available manpower and investment capital. The country also concentrated its foreign trade activities in India. British maritime fur traders were hindered by the East India Company (EIC) and South Sea Company (SSC). Although the SSC was moribund by the late 18th century, it had been granted the exclusive right to British trade on the entire western coast of the Americas from Cape Horn to Bering Strait and for 300 leagues (around 900 mi (1,400 km)) out into the Pacific Ocean. This, coupled with the EIC monopoly on British trade in China, meant sea otter skins were procurable only in the preserve of one monopoly and disposable only in that of the other. To operate legally, British maritime fur traders had to obtain licenses from both companies, which was difficult and expensive. Some traders obtained a license from the EIC only, figuring the SSC was unable to enforce its monopoly. Others obtained only the SSC license and took their furs to England, where they were trans-shipped to China. Some traders tried to evade the licenses by sailing their ships under foreign flags. The EIC's primary focus in China was the tea trade, with never much interest within the company for the maritime fur trade. The EIC usually allowed British vessels to import furs into Canton, but required the furs to be sold via EIC agents, and the company took a percentage of the returns. Worse, the EIC did not allow the British fur traders to export Chinese goods to Great Britain. Thus, the last and most profitable leg of the maritime fur trade system—carrying Chinese goods to Europe and America—was denied to British traders.

The first trading vessel dispatched solely for the purpose of the fur trade was the British Sea Otter commanded by James Hanna in 1785. In his brief visit to the coast, he obtained 560 pelts, which fetched a profit of $20,000 in Canton. The promise of such profits encouraged other traders. George Dixon and Nathaniel Portlock, former members of Cook's crew, became partners in the King George's Sound Company, formed in 1785 for the purpose of developing the maritime fur trade. They sailed from England on the King George and Queen Charlotte and spent 1786 and 1787 exploring and trading on the North West Coast. They spent the winters in Hawaii, where they were among the first visitors after Cook. Charles William Barkley, another early British trader, sailed the Imperial Eagle from England to the North West Coast via Hawaii, 1786–1788. He was accompanied by his wife, Frances Barkley, who became the first European woman to visit the Hawaiian Islands and the first woman to sail around the world without deception. Only two women are known to have sailed around the world before Frances: Jeanne Baré, disguised as a man, and Rose de Freycinet, wife of Louis de Freycinet, as a stowaway. Barkley chose to sail under the flag of Austria to evade paying for EIC and SSC licences. During their stop in Hawaii, the Barkleys hired a Native Hawaiian named Wynee as a maidservant. Wynee was the first Native Hawaiian to visit the Pacific Northwest—the first of many Kanakas. Barkley explored the coast south of Nootka Sound, discovering the Strait of Juan de Fuca in the process. He was the first trader to visit Neah Bay, a Makah settlement that later became an important port of call for maritime fur traders.

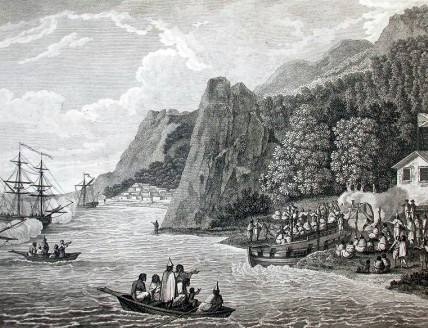
The launch of the North-West America at Nootka Sound, 1788

John Meares, who had also served under Cook, sailed to the North West Coast in 1786. He spent the winter in Prince William Sound, his ship trapped by ice and his men dying of scurvy. He was rescued by the timely arrival of Dixon and Portlock. Meares organized a second expedition of two ships, the Felice Adventurero and Iphigenia Nubiana. Meares was captain of the Felice and William Douglas was captain of the Iphigenia. Meares decided not to license his ships with the EIC, instead trying to conceal the illegal activity by using the flag of Portugal. They arrived at Nootka Sound in May 1788. Meares later claimed that Chief Maquinna sold him some land and on it Meares had a building erected. These claims later became a point of dispute during the Nootka Crisis. Spain, which sought control of Nootka Sound, rejected both claims; the true facts of the matter have never been fully established. There is no doubt, however, that Meares had the sloop North West America built in Nootka Sound, the first European-style vessel built in the Pacific Northwest.

Meares and others organized another expedition the following year. A number of vessels sailed to Nootka Sound, including Argonaut under James Colnett, Princess Royal, under Thomas Hudson, and Iphigenia Nubiana and North West America. Colnett intended to establish a permanent fur-trading post at Nootka Sound. However, Spain had also decided to permanently occupy Nootka Sound and assert sovereignty on the North West Coast. The decision was mostly due to Russian activity in Alaska and Russia's threat to occupy Nootka Sound themselves. Spanish naval officer Esteban José Martínez arrived at Nootka in May 1789 and built Fort San Miguel. When the Argonaut arrived, a dispute arose between Colnett and Martínez, leading to the seizure of several British ships and the arrest of their crews. This incident led to the Nootka Crisis, an international crisis between Britain and Spain. War was averted with the first Nootka Convention of 1790.

=== United States ===
American traders were largely influenced by an unauthorized report published by John Ledyard in Hartford, Connecticut, in 1783. By the 1790s, American traders were outcompeting the British and soon came to dominate the maritime fur trade south of Russian America. The opening of the trade came at a good time for New England's merchants. It provided a way to escape the depression that had followed the American Revolutionary War. It presented new trading opportunities that more than made up for the closure of British home and colonial ports to US imports. First Nations along the coast referred to American traders in the Chinook Jargon as Boston or Boston-men – after their main port in New England.

One of the first and most notable American maritime fur traders was Robert Gray. Gray made two trading voyages, the first from 1787 to 1790 and the second from 1790 to 1793. The first voyage was conducted with John Kendrick and the vessels Columbia Rediviva and Lady Washington. After the 1789 fur trading season was over, Gray sailed the Columbia to China via Hawaii, then to Boston via the Cape of Good Hope. The arrival of the Columbia at Boston was celebrated for being the first American circumnavigation of the world. However, the venture was not a commercial success. The ship's owners financed a second attempt and Gray sailed the Columbia from Boston only six weeks after arriving. Gray's second voyage was notable in several ways. After spending the summer trading on the Northwest Coast, Gray wintered on the coast. In Clayoquot Sound, Gray's crew built a house, dubbed Fort Defiance, and had the sloop Adventure built, the first American vessel built on the Northwest Coast. It was launched in March 1792 under the command of Robert Haswell. During the 1792 trading season, Gray concentrated on the southern part of the North West Coast, including the Columbia River. Although the mouth of the river had been spotted by the Spanish explorer Bruno de Heceta in 1775, no other explorer or fur trader had been able to find it and enter the river. Gray was the first to do so. He named the river after his ship. The event was later used by the United States in support of their claims to the Pacific Northwest.

Other notable American maritime fur traders include William F. Sturgis, Joseph Ingraham, Simon Metcalfe and his son Thomas Humphrey Metcalfe, Daniel Cross, John Boit, James Magee, and John DeWolf, among many others. One of the most successful American firms involved in the Northwest Trade was Perkins and Company.

== Boom years ==
=== American ascendancy ===
The maritime fur trade was dominated by American traders from the 1790s to the 1820s. Between 1788 and 1826, American merchant ships made at least 127 voyages between the United States and China, via the Northwest Coast. The returns were lucrative. During the late 1810s, the return on investment ranged from about 300% to 500%. Even higher profits were common in the first decade of the 19th century. Returns of 2,200% or higher were common, although when taking into account the cost of buying and outfitting vessels, the 2,200% return would be closer to 525%.

The trade's boom years ended around 1810, after which a long decline was marked by increasing economic diversification. By 1810, the supply of sea otter pelts had fallen due to overhunting. American trade declined during the War of 1812, but after 1815, Americans were able to resume and expand the maritime fur trade, and continued to dominate.

=== Russian expansion ===
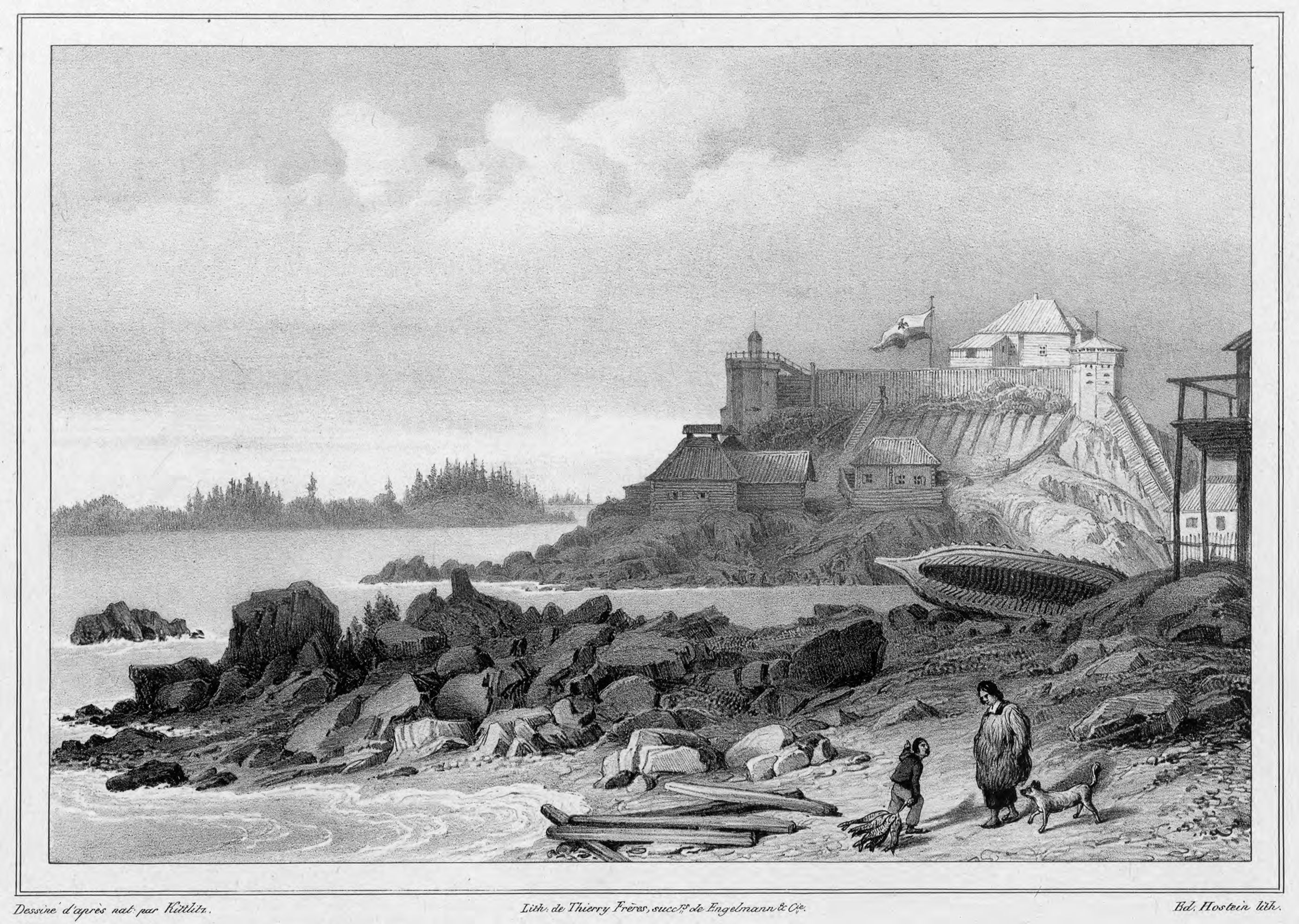
Old Sitka

The Russian entry to the Northwest Coast, beyond Prince William Sound, was slow because of a shortage of ships and sailors. Yakutat Bay was reached in 1794 and the settlement of Slavorossiya, originally intended to be the colonial capital, was built there in 1795. Reconnaissance of the coast as far as Haida Gwaii was carried out by James Shields, a British employee of the Golikov-Shelikhov Company. In 1795, Alexandr Baranov sailed into Sitka Sound, claiming it for Russia. Hunting parties arrived in the following years. By 1800, three-quarters of the Russian-American Company's sea otter skins came from the Sitka Sound area, amounting to several thousand per year. Sitka Sound was also where serious competition between the Russians, British, and Americans first arose.

In July 1799, Baranov returned to Sitka Sound on the brig Oryol and established the settlement of Arkhangelsk, also known as Fort Archangel Gabriel. In June 1802, Tlingit warriors attacked the settlement and killed or captured most of the 150 Russians and Aleuts living there. Baranov led an armed expedition to retake Sitka by force in June 1804. The Russian warship Neva joined Baranov at Sitka. A new Russian fort was established while the Tlingit prepared to defend themselves with a well-armed fort of their own. Tension rapidly escalated into skirmishes and negotiations broke down. In early October, the Russians attacked the Tlingit fort with cannon from the Neva and from a land party. The Tlingit responded with powerful gun and cannon fire of their own. The Battle of Sitka continued for several days until the Tlingit abandoned their fort and left the area. Tlingit accounts of the battle refuse to admit defeat or give the Russians credit for taking the Tlingit fort. The Russians destroyed the abandoned Tlingit fort and named the new Russian fort Novo-Arkhangelsk (New Archangel), also known as Fort Archangel Michael and Fort Saint Michael. The confrontations at Sitka in 1802 and 1804 played a significant role in subsequent Tlingit-Russian relations for generations.

Novo-Arkhangelsk soon became the primary settlement and colonial capital of Russian America. After the Alaska Purchase, it was renamed Sitka, and became the first capital of Alaska Territory.

The Russian-American Company (RAC) was incorporated in 1799, putting an end to the promyshlenniki period and beginning an era of centralized monopoly. Its charter was laid out in a 1799 ukase by the new emperor, Paul I, which granted the company monopolistic control over trade in the Aleutian Islands and the North America mainland, south to 55° north latitude (approximating the present border on coast between British Columbia and Alaska). The RAC was modeled on Britain's East India Company (EIC) and Hudson's Bay Company (HBC). Russian officials intended the company to operate both as a business enterprise and a state organization for extending imperial influence, similar to the EIC and HBC. It was also hoped that the company would be able to conduct maritime trade with China and Japan, although this goal was not realized. In 1818 the Russian government took control of the RAC from the merchants who held the charter. The explorer and naval officer Ferdinand Petrovich von Wrangel was the first president of the company during the government period. In 1867, the Alaska Purchase transferred control of Alaska to the United States and the commercial interests of the Russian American Company were sold to Hutchinson, Kohl & Company of San Francisco, who then merged with several other groups to form the Alaska Commercial Company.

The Russian population in America never surpassed 1,000; the peak was 823 in 1839. However, the RAC employed and fed thousands of Natives. According to official census counts by the Russians, the population of Russian America peaked at 10,313 in 1838. An additional 12,500 people were known local residents not included in the colonial register. An estimated 17,000 more local residents were present but unknown to the Russians. Thus, the total population of the Russian–occupied parts of Russian America was approximately 40,000.

== Diversification and transformation ==
=== Russian-American Company ===
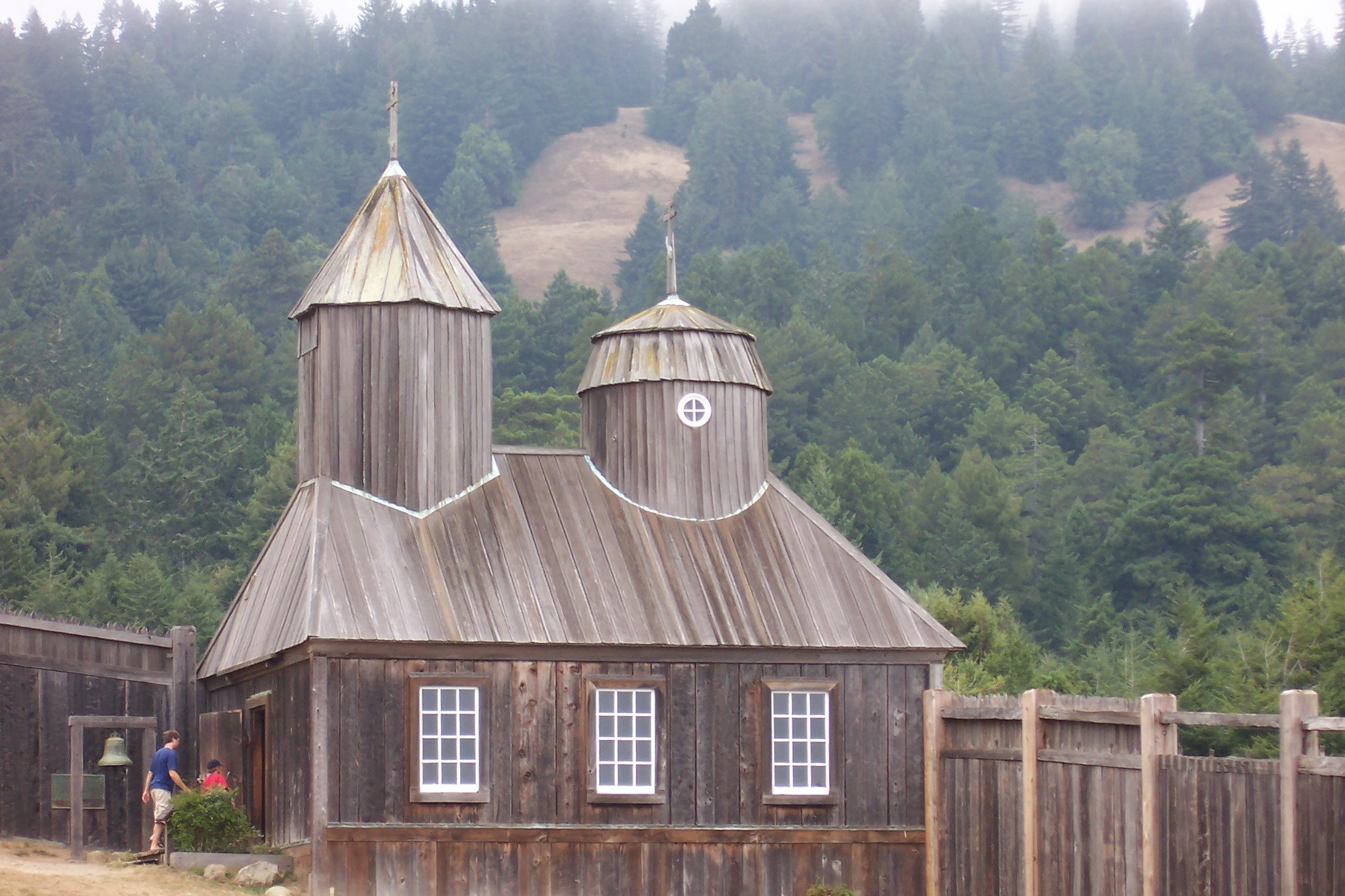
Reconstructed chapel at Fort Ross

Colony Ross, known as Fort Ross today, was built by Ivan Kuskov, Timofei Tarakanov, and others, in California just north of San Francisco Bay. It was the RAC's southernmost outpost and operated from 1812 to 1841. It was established to support the hunting of California sea otters and as an agricultural base for supplying the northern settlements with food. It also was used to conduct trade with Alta California. The Ross Colony included a number of settlements spread out over an area stretching from Point Arena to Tomales Bay. The administrative center was Port Rumianstev at Bodega Harbor, off Bodega Bay. An artel hunting camp was located on the Farallon Islands. Three ranches were established: the Kostromitinov Ranch on the Russian River near the mouth of Willow Creek, the Khlebnikov Ranch in the Salmon Creek valley about a mile (1.6 km) north of the present day Bodega, and the Chernykh Ranch near present-day Graton. Fort Ross employed Alaska Natives to hunt seals and sea otters on the California coast. By 1840, California's sea otter population had been severely depleted.

Russian emperor Alexander I issued the Ukase of 1821 which announced Russian hegemony over the Northwest Coast from 45°50′ north latitude onwards in a northern direction. The only Russian attempt to enforce the ukase of 1821 was the seizure of the US brig Pearl by the Russian sloop Apollon, in 1822. The Pearl, a maritime fur trading vessel, was sailing from Boston to Sitka. On a protest from the US government, the vessel was released and compensation paid. Britain and the United States protested the ukase and negotiations ultimately resulted in the Russo-American Treaty of 1824 and the Anglo-Russian Convention of 1825. These treaties established 54°40′ as the southern boundary of exclusively Russian territory. The Anglo-Russian treaty delineated the boundary of Russian America fully. The border began on the coast at 54°40′, then ran north along the mountains near the coast until it reached 141° west longitude, after which the boundary ran north along that line of longitude to the Arctic Ocean. Aside from boundary adjustments to the Alaska Panhandle, stemming from the Alaska boundary dispute of the late 19th century, this is the current boundary of the state of Alaska.

=== American methods and strategies ===
American traders developed the "Golden Round" trade route around the world. Ships sailed from Boston to the Pacific via Cape Horn, then to the North West Coast, arriving in the spring or early summer. They would spend the summer and early autumn fur trading on the coast, mainly between Sitka and the Columbia River. In late autumn they sailed to the Hawaiian Islands, where they typically spent the winter, then from Hawaii to Macau on the Pearl River Delta, arriving in autumn. Trading in Canton did not begin until November, when tea shipments were ready. The Americans had to hire pilots to take their ships up the Pearl River to Canton's "out port" of Whampoa. Foreign ships were not allowed in Canton itself. Trading took weeks or months, after which the ships were loaded with Chinese goods such as teas, silks, porcelains, sugar, cassia, and curios. They left in the winter and used the northeasterly monsoon winds of the South China Sea to reach the Sunda Strait and then used the southeasterly trade winds to cross the Indian Ocean to the Cape of Good Hope. From there the ships sailed to Boston, where they traditionally docked at the India Wharf.

Frederic William Howay described that as the "golden round": The Americans had a perfect golden round of profits: first, the profit on the original cargo of trading goods when exchanged for furs; second, the profit when the furs were transmuted into Chinese goods; and, third, the profit on those goods when they reached America. In the later years of the North West Trade the pattern became more complex as additional markets and side voyages were incorporated.

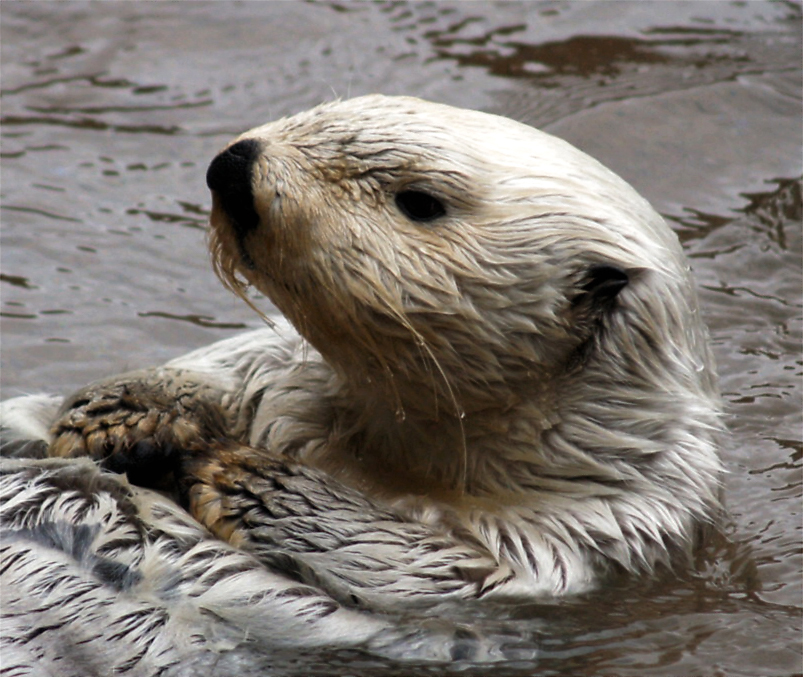
A sea otter

As the North West trade developed it became riskier to depend solely upon acquiring sea otter furs through trade with the Indigenous people of the coast. Diversification began in the first decade of the 19th century if not earlier, and increased over time. Maritime fur trading voyages were no longer solely about taking sea otter furs from the North West Coast to Canton. Other commodities and markets throughout the Pacific were added to the system. Sandalwood, mainly from Hawaii, became an important item of the China trade. Just as the sea otter trade was waning the sandalwood trade boomed, peaking in 1821, then declined. Hawaiian sandalwood was depleted by 1830. Fiji and the Marquesas Islands were the other principal sources of sandalwood. Most had been cut by 1820. Fiji was also a source of bêche-de-mer, a gourmet delicacy in China. American traders began acquiring Fijian bêche-de-mer in 1804 and trepanging boomed there. Bêche-de-mer became Fiji's leading export by 1830. Depletion led to a decline and the end of the trade by 1850. Trepanging was also done from 1812 in Hawaii and from 1814 in the Marquesas. Other side trades included Chilean copper from Valparaíso, scrimshaw (whale teeth), tortoise shells and meat from the Galápagos Islands, sugar from Manila, and, from Java, areca nuts (so-called betel nuts) and coffee beans. Sealing boomed in the Juan Fernández Islands and the Juan Fernández fur seal was rapidly exploited to near-extinction. The northern fur seal rookeries were controlled by Russia, so Americans acquired northern fur seal skins through trade rather than sealing.

Another side trade was smuggling along the Pacific coast of the Spanish Empire, where foreign trade was prohibited by Spanish law. This trade peaked in the 1810s, then faded in the 1820s. Traders concentrated on Alta California, which produced a surplus of grain, beef, tallow, and hides, but was chronically short of manufactured goods. American ships brought goods to the missions of Alta California in exchange for grain, beef, and Californian sea otter skins. The grain, beef, and other provisions were taken to Sitka, which was perennially short of foods supplies. After Mexico gained independence in 1821 the American trade with Alta California continued in a slightly modified form. American traders brought mostly clothing, cottons, silks, lace, cutlery, alcohol, and sugar, which were traded for hides and tallow at a profit generally between 200% and 300%. The California Hide Trade became a major industry in its own right. By the 1830s, however, the missions of Alta California had been secularized by Mexican authorities and deserted by Indian labourers. The trade slid into unprofitability. The decline of the American trade with Alta California left just one significant alternative to the ever-dwindling sea otter trade—the provisioning of the settlements of Russian America, which lasted until the Americans abandoned the North West Coast altogether in the early 1840s. From the first decade of the 19th century until 1841 American ships visited Sitka regularly, trading provisions, textiles, and liquor for fur seal skins, timber, and fish. This trade was usually highly profitable for the Americans and the Russian settlements depended on it. Thus when Emperor Nicholas I issued the ukase of 1821, banning foreign trade north of the 51st parallel, the Russian colonies in America were forced to ignore the ban and engage in smuggling.

On the Northwest Coast itself the fur trade was supplemented with slave trading. The pre-existing Indigenous slave trade was enlarged and expanded upon by fur traders, especially the American traders. While working the coast for furs, traders would purchase slaves around the mouth of the Columbia River and in the Strait of Juan de Fuca, then sell or trade them on the northern coast. Few traders admitted to slaving, although some wrote about it in detail. Further information comes from sources such as reports by HBC officers. Aemelius Simpson of the Hudson's Bay Company wrote in 1828 that American traders on coast trafficked in slaves, "purchasing them at a cheap rate from one tribe and disposing of them to others at a very high profit." He concluded that the American traders made more money from selling slaves, rum, and gunpowder than they did from fur trading.

The Chinese sought this mammal's fur due to its great commercial value and its 'prime coat' all year long. The pelt was used by the wealthy Chinese as clothing decoration (robe trimming) and the Russians used it as an ornamental piece. The other furs that were sent to Europe and America were changed to 'coat collars or hats'. Due to this great demand and worth of the sea otters pelt, the Russian-America Company (RAC) annual expenses was around 1000,000 rubles each year and profited over 500,000 rubles per year. The fur of the Californian southern sea otter, E. l. nereis, was less highly prized and thus less profitable. After the northern sea otter was hunted to local extinction, maritime fur traders shifted to California until the southern sea otter was likewise nearly extinct. The British and American maritime fur traders took their furs to the Chinese port of Guangzhou (Canton), where they worked within the established Canton system. Furs from Russian America were mostly sold to China via the Mongolian trading town of Kyakhta, which had been opened to Russian trade by the 1727 Treaty of Kyakhta.

=== Decline ===
Large-scale economic issues played a role in the decline of the maritime fur trade and the China trade in general. Before the 19th century, Chinese demand for Western raw materials or manufactured goods was small, but specie was accepted, resulting in a general drain of precious metals from the West to China. The situation reversed in the early 19th century for a variety of reasons. Western demand for Chinese goods declined relative to new options (for example, coffee from the West Indies began to replace tea in the United States), while Chinese demand for Western items increased, such as for English manufactures, American cotton goods, and opium which was outlawed but smuggled into China on a large and increasing scale. Before long, China was being drained of specie and saturated with Western goods. At the same time, intense speculation in the China trade by American and British merchant companies began. By the 1820s, too many firms were competing for an overstocked market, resulting in bankruptcies and consolidation. The inevitable commercial crisis struck in 1826–27, after the Panic of 1825. Tea prices plummeted and the China trade's volume collapsed by about a third. By this time, the old maritime fur trade on the Northwest Coast and the Old China Trade itself were dying. The final blow came with the depression of 1841–43, following the Panic of 1837.

Over time, the maritime fur traders concentrated on different parts of the North West Coast. In the 1790s, the west coast of Vancouver Island, especially Nootka Sound, was frequently visited. By the 1810s, the locus had shifted to Haida Gwaii and the Alexander Archipelago, and in the 1820s, farther north to areas near Sitka Sound. After about 1830, it shifted south to the area from Dixon Entrance to Queen Charlotte Sound. During the early years, ships tended to cruise the coast, seeking trading opportunities whenever they arose. Later, ships spent more time in specific harbors. As fur resources dwindled and prices rose, ship captains increasingly concentrated on a few key ports of call and stayed longer. Eventually, acquiring enough furs for the China trade in a single year was no longer possible. Some traders wintered in Hawaii, returning to the coast in the spring, but many wintered on the North West Coast, usually in one of the key trading harbors. These harbors included "Clemencitty" on Tongass Island, today called Port Tongass; the several "Kaigani" harbors on south Dall Island north of Cape Muzon, including American Bay and Datzkoo Harbor (known as Taddiskey or Tattasco); "Nahwitti" or "Newhitty" on northern Vancouver Island; and "Tongass" in Clarence Strait, today called Tamgas Harbor, which was said to be the most popular wintering place for American ships in the 1830s. Many significant trading sites were in Haida Gwaii, including Cloak Bay, Masset, Skidegate, Cumshewa, Skedans, and Houston Stewart Channel, known as "Coyah's Harbor", after Chief Koyah.

As marine furs became depleted in the early 19th century, American ship captains began to accept increasing numbers of land furs such as beaver, which were brought from the interior to the coast via Indigenous trade networks from New Caledonia—today the Omineca and Nechako districts of the Central Interior of British Columbia. During the 1820s, the British Hudson's Bay Company (HBC), which considered the interior fur trade to be its domain, began to experience significant losses as a result of this diversion of furs to the coast. To protect its interests, the HBC entered the coast trade to drive away the American traders. This goal was achieved during the 1830s. By 1841, the American traders had abandoned the North West Coast. For a time, the North West Coast trade was controlled by the HBC and the RAC.

=== Hudson's Bay Company ===
From 1779 to 1821 two British fur trading companies, the Montreal-based North West Company (NWC) and the London-based Hudson's Bay Company, competed for control of the fur trade of what later became Western Canada. The struggle, which eventually reached the point of armed battles such as the 1816 Battle of Seven Oaks, was mostly over control of Rupert's Land, east of the Continental Divide. Around the turn of the 19th century the NWC expanded its operations westward, across the Rocky Mountains into the mostly unexplored Pacific Northwest. By the 1810s the NWC had established new fur trading operations west of the Rockies, in New Caledonia and the Columbia District. Starting in 1811 the American Pacific Fur Company (PFC) challenged the NWC in the Pacific Northwest, but during the War of 1812 the PFC, at risk of being captured by the British Navy, sold its entire operation to the NWC. The PFC had built Fort Astoria at the mouth of the Columbia River. Under the NWC it was renamed Fort George, and became the Columbia District's Pacific seaport. The NWC sought to establish a profitable beaver fur trade with China. Due to the East India Company's (EIC) control over British trading in Canton the NWC turned to American shipping companies. Starting in 1792 the NWC had beaver furs shipped to China by American firms. After the acquisition of Fort George (Astoria) in 1815 the NWC began to supply the Columbia District by sea through the Boston-based firm of Perkins and Company. After arriving at Fort George the American ship took a cargo of NWC beaver furs to Canton, exchanged them for China goods and conveyed them to Boston for sale. Even though Perkins and Company took 25% of the proceeds the arrangement was still about 50% more profitable than using British ships and selling furs in Canton through the EIC for bills payable on London and returning from China with no cargo.

In 1821, after tensions between the NWC and HBC had erupted into violence the NWC was forced to merge into the HBC. As a result, the HBC acquired the Columbia District and its trade with China. At first the system of shipping furs via the American Perkins and Company was continued, but in 1822 the United States Customs Service imposed a heavy ad valorem duty on the proceeds. The HBC stopped using American middlemen and instead tried selling furs through the EIC. In 1824 and 1825 the HBC sold 20,000 beaver and 7,000 land-otter skins in China through the EIC, but the arrangement did not prove advantageous for either firm.

In the wake of the NWC's forced merger into the HBC, George Simpson reorganized operations in New Caledonia and the Columbia Department. His efforts and keen fiscal sense, combined with a resurgence of American traders on the coast after the Russo-American Treaty of 1824, resulted in the HBC's decision to enter the coast maritime fur trade and drive out the Americans. By the early 1820s American traders were taking 3,000 to 5,000 beaver skins, mostly from New Caledonia, to Canton every year. By the early 1830s the number had reached 10,000 annually, which was as many as the HBC itself was acquiring from New Caledonia and half of the total output of the entire Columbia Department. In addition, the Americans were paying higher prices for the furs, which forced the HBC to do the same. The HBC effort to gain control of the coastal fur trade began in the late 1820s. It took some time for the HBC to acquire the necessary ships, skilled seamen, trade goods, and intelligence about the coast trade. Simpson decided that the "London ships", which brought goods to Fort Vancouver and returned to England with furs, should arrive early enough to make a coasting voyage before departing. The first London ship to do this was the schooner Cadboro, in 1827. However, its voyage did not get beyond the Strait of Georgia and only 2 sea otter and 28 land otter and beaver skins were acquired. In 1828 the HBC decided to deploy three ships for the coast trade, but setbacks caused delays. The William and Ann was lost in 1829, and the Isabella in 1830, both at the Columbia Bar. The HBC's shipping was inadequate for the coast trade until the middle 1830s. In 1835 two ships were added to the HBC's coast fleet. One of them, the Beaver, was a steamship, and it proved extremely useful in the variable winds, strong currents, and long narrow inlets.

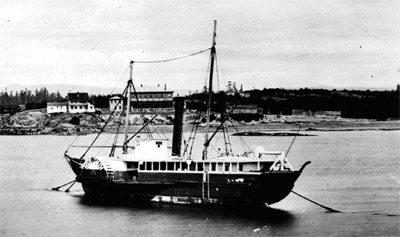
The HBC steamship Beaver

To strengthen its coast trade the Hudson's Bay Company built a series of fortified trading posts, the first of which was Fort Langley, established in 1827 on the Fraser River about 50 km (31 mi) from the river's mouth. The next was Fort Simpson, founded in 1831 at the mouth of the Nass River, and moved in 1834 several miles to the present Port Simpson. In 1833 Fort McLoughlin was established on an island in Milbanke Sound and Fort Nisqually was built at the southern end of Puget Sound. An overland trail linked Fort Nisqually and Fort Vancouver, so HBC vessels trading along the northern coast could unload furs and take on trade goods without having to navigate the Columbia River and its hazardous bar. Later coastal posts included Fort Stikine (1840), Fort Durham (1840), and Fort Victoria (1843).

=== American disadvantage ===
It was not easy for the HBC to drive the Americans away from the North West Coast. The Americans had decades of experience and knew the coast's complex physical and human geography. It took until 1835 for the HBC to gain this level of experience, but the Americans still had several advantages. For several reasons they were willing and able to pay high prices for furs—much higher than the HBC could match without taking large financial losses. The American ventures were global in scope. They tapped multiple markets of which the North West Coast was but one. By the 1820s American ships routinely spent years in the Pacific, making several voyages between various places such as California, Hawaii, the Philippines, and Canton. American ships were usually stocked with a surplus of trade goods intended for trade on the North West Coast. It was always best to get rid of any extra trade goods on the North West Coast, "dumping" them at any price, before leaving. They would use up stowage space that could be used more profitably elsewhere. The HBC therefore faced a major challenge even after they became experienced with the coast's geography and Indigenous peoples. The American system not only raised the price of furs but also lowered the value of trade goods. Furthermore, the Indigenous people knew that increased competition served their interests and gave them bargaining power. They had no desire to see the Americans abandon the coast trade. Therefore, the HBC had to not just match but exceed the prices paid by Americans if they hoped to drive the Americans away. Beaver fur prices on the coast could be many times what the HBC was paying in the interior. There was no hope of making a profit. In order to compete on the coast the HBC had to take large, long-term financial losses.

The main advantage the HBC had over the Americans was that it could take such losses. As a vast corporation with a large amount of capital, the company was able to undersell the Americans, taking a loss, for years on end. By the middle to late 1830s the HBC policy on the coast was to pay whatever price necessary to ensure that furs fell into their hands and not the Americans. American traders soon found the coast fur trade unprofitable—the HBC had captured the trade. But Americans still traded with the Russians at Sitka and, once on the coast were wont to seek a few furs. As long as this continued, the HBC continued to have to pay high prices for furs and take losses. Eventually the Sitka trade became financially risky. The American-Russian agreement of 1824, which allowed Americans to trade in the Alaska Panhandle, expired in 1834 and was not renewed. In 1839 the RAC–HBC Agreement protocols were signed, under which the HBC would supply the RAC with provisions and manufactures in exchange for a ten-year lease for portions of the Alaska Panhandle. This proved to be the final blow for the American traders, who were finally driven out of the North West Coast maritime fur trade altogether.

The HBC drastically reduced the price paid for furs, by 50% in many cases. By this time, however, the fur trade was in decline, both on the coast and the continent, due to a general depletion of fur-bearing animals, along with a reduction in the demand for beaver pelts. A financial panic in 1837 resulted in a general slump in the fur and China trade, bringing an end to a half-century boom. During the 1840s, the HBC closed most of their coastal trading posts, leaving the coast trade to just Fort Simpson and the Beaver, with the new depot at Fort Victoria anchoring the southern coast.

== Significance ==
The half century or so of the maritime fur trade and the North West Coast trade enriched Boston shipowners, creating capital that helped New England's transformation from an agrarian to an industrial society. The trade stimulated the culture of North West Coast Natives, made Hawaii famous, and nearly overwhelmed the Native Hawaiians with foreign influences. It played a role in increased commercial pressure on China at Canton. Fur-bearing animals were devastated, especially sea otters. By 1850, sea otters were virtually extinct throughout the North West Coast and found only in the Aleutian Islands and California.

=== Northwest Coast ===
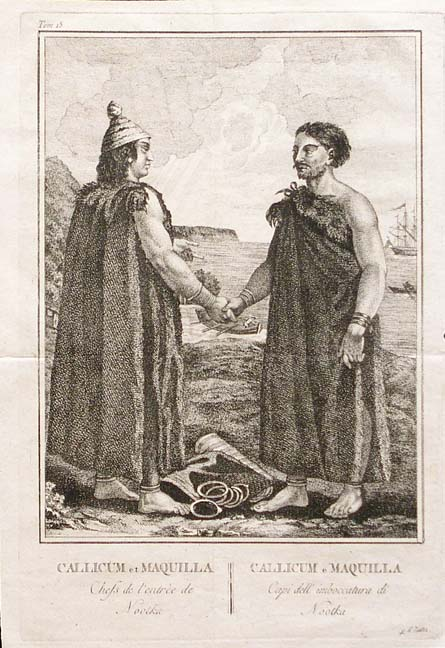
Callicum and Maquinna

The maritime fur trade brought the Natives of the Northwest Coast material prosperity, wealth, and technology. It enlarged and transformed intertribal relations, trade, and war, including the "coastalization" of inland Natives. Many inland Natives adopted potlatching and coastal descent systems. At first the trade caused a rise in the power of a few key chiefs such as Maquinna, Wickaninish, Tatoosh, Concomly (Madsaw), Kotlean (Sitka Tlingit), Kow (Kaigani Haidas), Cuneah (Coyac; Kiusta Haida), Legaic (Tsimshian), Woyala (Heiltsuk), and Cumshewa (Haida). This was followed by a proliferation of chiefs and a general debasement of chieftainship, in part due to widespread wealth, giving individual hunters the means to challenge the traditional chiefs. There was an increase in the frequency of potlatching, which was used by the nouveau riche in challenging the traditional chiefs. In response the hereditary clan chiefs defended their traditional powers through an increased use of noble ancestry names, totems, and crests, all validated by potlatches.

Negative effects of the coast trade on the Native peoples of the Northwest included waves of epidemic disease, smallpox worst of all. Other health problems included the spread of alcoholism, tuberculosis, venereal diseases including syphilis, and sterility. The coast trade also promoted and enhanced the pre-existing system of Native slavery and Native slave trading. The overall number of slaves increased, as did their distribution and exploitation. Despite these negative effects, the Northwest Coast Natives were at first largely spared the additional effects that would have come had there been more permanent posts, political administration, missionizing, and colonization. The early traders were mostly seasonal visitors and the later HBC posts were few and small. Missionization and direct colonial rule over the coastal Natives did not begin in earnest until the middle-to-late 19th century. During the early 19th century, Native culture not only survived but flourished.

The maritime trade also brought changes to the Natives' traditional seasonal migration patterns and settlement locations. The coastal people were "cosmopolitanized", that is, they were incorporated into a global market economy. At first, their main export was furs, later supplemented and replaced by salmon, lumber, and artwork. By the late 19th century the region was famous for its distinctive Northwest Coast art, especially large works like totem poles. The Natives imported many Western goods and soon became dependent on many, such as firearms and metal tools. Textiles became a vital trade item during the early maritime fur trade era. The value of furs caused a shift in Native dress from furs to textiles, which was reinforced by the general depletion of fur animals. Firearms had both positive and negative effects. They made hunting much more efficient but also made warfare much more deadly.

After the early 19th century, Indigenous cultures on the coast suffered under increasing colonization, colonial rule, land seizure, forced relocations, missionization, ethnic cleansing, and major population loss from repeated epidemics. The 1862 Pacific Northwest smallpox epidemic was especially devastating to Indigenous population, culture, and sovereignty. At the time and still today First Nations such as the Tsilhqotʼin say the colonial government deliberately spread smallpox with the aim of ending Indigenous land rights and Indigenous rights.

=== Russian America ===
The Russians, unlike the British and Americans, endeavoured to convert the Natives to Christianity. Many Aleuts joined the Russian Orthodox Church. Russian missionaries founded several churches for the Natives, such as the Church of the Holy Ascension in Unalaska. A notable Russian missionary was Saint Innocent of Alaska. For his work as a missionary, bishop, and later archbishop in Alaska and the Russian Far East he was canonized. One of the earliest Christian martyrs in North America was Saint Peter the Aleut. Other important Russian missionaries include Herman of Alaska and Joasaph Bolotov.

=== Hawaii ===
The effect of the maritime fur trade on Native Hawaiians was similar to that of the North West Coast Natives, but more powerfully transformative. The Hawaiians were generally receptive to Western incursion and settlement. The rise of King Kamehameha I and the unification of the islands under his rule were made possible in part by the effects of the maritime fur trade and its larger Pacific scope. The influx of wealth and technology helped make the new Kingdom of Hawaii relatively strong, in political and economic terms. Many exotic foodstuffs were introduced to the Hawaiian Islands during the early trading era, including plants such as beans, cabbage, onions, squash, pumpkins, melons, and oranges, as well as cash crops like tobacco, cotton, and sugar. Animals introduced included cattle, horses, sheep, and goats. Due to its high fertility Oahu became the most important of the islands. By the 1820s, the population of Honolulu was over 10,000. The Native Hawaiian population suffered waves of epidemic disease, including cholera. The availability of alcohol, especially grog and gin, led to widespread boozing and an increased use of traditional kava intoxication. These health issues, plus warfare related to the unification of the islands, droughts, and sandalwooding taking precedence over farming all contributed to an increase in famines and a general population decline. By 1850, the Native population had dropped by perhaps 50%.

=== South China ===
The effect of the maritime fur trade in Southern China by itself was probably not great. The Canton trade as a whole had limited effect on China, mostly limited to the tea growers of Fujian, the silk producers of Nanjing, the craftsmen of Canton, and various middlemen, and merchants. The ruling Manchus kept foreign trade by ship at bay. It was restricted to Canton, and even there was allowed only outside the city walls. China was generally self-sufficient. The main effect of the Old China Trade was an increased import of opium and related outflow of specie, which resulted in China being incorporated into the capitalist world system after 1830. However, the maritime fur trade played a minor role in this process.

=== New England ===
The maritime fur trade was, for the United States, a branch of the "East India" (Asian) trade based in Salem, Boston, Providence, New York City (Fanning & Coles), Philadelphia, and Baltimore. The trade focused on Asian ports such as Canton, Kolkata (Calcutta), Chennai (Madras), Manila, Jakarta (Batavia), and the islands of Mauritius and Sumatra. Goods exported included furs, rum, ammunition, ginseng, lumber, ice, salt, Spanish silver dollars, iron, tobacco, opium, and tar. Goods brought back from Asia included muslins, silks, nankeens, spices, cassia, chinaware (porcelain), tea, sugar, and drugs. The maritime fur trade was just one part of the overall system. As a whole the Asian trade had a significant effect on the early United States, especially New England. The accumulation of large amounts of capital in short time contributed to American industrial and manufacturing development, which was compounded by rapid population growth and technological advancements. In New England the textile industry rose to dominance in early to middle 19th century. In light of the decline of the fur trade and a post-Napoleonic depression in commerce, capital shifted "from wharf to waterfall", that is, from shipping ventures to textile mills (which were originally located where water power was available). The textile industry in turn had large effect on slavery in the United States, increasing the demand for cotton and helping make possible the rapid expansion of the cotton plantation system across the Deep South.

== See also ==
- California Fur Rush
- Indigenous peoples of the Americas
- First Nations of Canada
- Fort McLoughlin
- History of the west coast of North America
- Maritime history of California
- North American fur trade
- Thirteen Factories
- Awa'uq Massacre
- John DeWolf (sea captain)
- Il’mena
- Margaret (1791 ship)
- North West America
- Atahualpa (ship)
- Union (sloop)

== Books cited ==
- Bancroft, Hubert Howe; Alfred Bates; Ivan Petroff; William Nemos (1886). History of Alaska: 1730–1885. A. L. Bancroft & Company. ISBN 0-665-14184-X. OCLC 2750274.
- Bockstoce, John R. (2009). Furs and Frontiers in the Far North: The Contest Among Native and Foreign Nations for the Bering Strait Fur Trade. Yale University Press. ISBN 978-0-300-14921-0.
- Bockstoce, John R. (2005). The Opening of the Maritime Fur Trade at Bering Strait: Americans and Russians meet the Kan̳hiġmiut in Kotzebue Sound. Transactions of the American Philosophical Society, v. 95, pt. 1. American Philosophical Society. ISBN 978-0-87169-951-0.
- Borneman, Walter R. (2004). Alaska: Saga of a Bold Land. HarperCollins. ISBN 978-0-06-050307-9.
- Dmytryshyn, Basil; E. A. P. Crownhart-Vaughan; Thomas Vaughan (1989). The Russian American Colonies, 1798–1867: A Documentary Record. Oregon Historical Society Press. ISBN 978-0-87595-150-8.
- Dodge, Ernest Stanley (1976). Islands and Empires: Western Impact on the Pacific and East Asia. University of Minnesota Press. ISBN 978-0-8166-0788-4.
- Farrow, Anne; Joel Lang; Jennifer Frank (2006). Complicity: How the North Promoted, Prolonged, and Profited from Slavery. Random House. ISBN 978-0-345-46783-6.
- Frost, Alan (1999). The Voyage of the Endeavour: Captain Cook and the Discovery of the Pacific. Allen & Unwin. ISBN 1-86508-200-7.
- Fryer, Mary Beacock (1986). Battlefields of Canada. Dundurn Press. ISBN 1-55002-007-2.
- Gibson, James R. (1976). Imperial Russia in Frontier America: The Changing Geography of Supply of Russian America, 1784–1867. Oxford University Press. OCLC 2085278.
- Gibson, James R. (1992). Otter Skins, Boston Ships, and China Goods: The Maritime Fur Trade of the Northwest Coast, 1785–1841. McGill-Queen's University Press. ISBN 0-7735-2028-7.
- Haycox, Stephen W. (2002). Alaska: An American Colony. University of Washington Press. ISBN 978-0-295-98249-6.
- Hayes, Derek (2007). Historical Atlas of California. University of California Press. ISBN 978-0-520-25258-5.
- Hayes, Derek (1999). Historical Atlas of the Pacific Northwest: Maps of exploration and Discovery. Sasquatch Books. ISBN 1-57061-215-3.
- Howay, Frederic William; Robert Haswell; John Box Hoskins; John Boit (1990) [first published 1941]. Voyages of the "Columbia" to the Northwest coast, 1787–1790 and 1790–1793. Oregon Historical Society Press in cooperation with the Massachusetts Historical Society. ISBN 978-0-87595-250-5.
- Kan, Sergei (1999). Memory Eternal: Tlingit Culture and Russian Orthodox Christianity through Two Centuries. University of Washington Press. ISBN 978-0-295-97806-2.
- Lal, Brij V.; Kate Fortune (2000). The Pacific Islands: An Encyclopedia. University of Hawaii Press. ISBN 978-0-8248-2265-1.
- Laut, Agnes Christina (1915). Pioneers of the Pacific Coast: a Chronicle of Sea Rovers and Fur Hunters, Volume 22. Glasgow, Brook & Company. OCLC 2534494.
- Mackie, Richard Somerset (1997). Trading Beyond the Mountains: The British Fur Trade on the Pacific 1793–1843. Vancouver: University of British Columbia (UBC) Press. ISBN 0-7748-0613-3.
- Malloy, Mary (1998). Boston Men on the Northwest Coast: The American Maritime Fur Trade 1788-1844. The Limestone Press. ISBN 978-1-895901-18-4.
- McDowell, Jim (1998). José Narváez: The Forgotten Explorer. Spokane, Washington: The Arthur H. Clark Company. ISBN 0-87062-265-X.
- McDougall, Walter A. (2004). Let the Sea Make a Noise: A History of the North Pacific from Magellan to MacArthur. Harper Collins. ISBN 978-0-06-057820-6.
- Meinig, D.W. (1986). The Shaping of America: A Geographical Perspective on 500 Years of History, Volume 1: Atlantic America, 1492–1800. Yale University Press. ISBN 0-300-03548-9.
- Oleksa, Michael (1992). Orthodox Alaska: A Theology of Mission. St Vladimir's Seminary Press. ISBN 978-0-88141-092-1.
- Pethick, Derek (1976). First Approaches to the Northwest Coast. Vancouver: J.J. Douglas. ISBN 0-88894-056-4.
- Pethick, Derek (1980). The Nootka Connection: Europe and the Northwest Coast 1790–1795. Vancouver: Douglas & McIntyre. ISBN 0-88894-279-6.
- Reynoldson, Fiona (2000). Native Americans: The Indigenous Peoples of North America. Heinemann. ISBN 978-0-435-31015-8.
- Tovell, Freeman M. (2008). At the Far Reaches of Empire: The Life of Juan Francisco De La Bodega Y Quadra. University of British Columbia Press. ISBN 978-0-7748-1367-9.
- Weber, David J. (1994). The Spanish Frontier in North America. Yale University Press. ISBN 978-0-300-05917-5.
