= Parry Point =

Parry Point (79°30′S 30°20′W) is a prominent rock outcrop lying north of the mouth of Slessor Glacier and 25 nautical miles (46 km) southwest of Mount Faraway in the Theron Mountains, on the east side of the Filchner Ice Shelf. First mapped in 1957–58 by the Commonwealth Trans-Antarctic Expedition and named for R. Admiral Cecil R.L. Parry, Secretary to the Commonwealth Trans-Antarctic Expedition of 1955–58.
