= Cuneah =

Haida chief

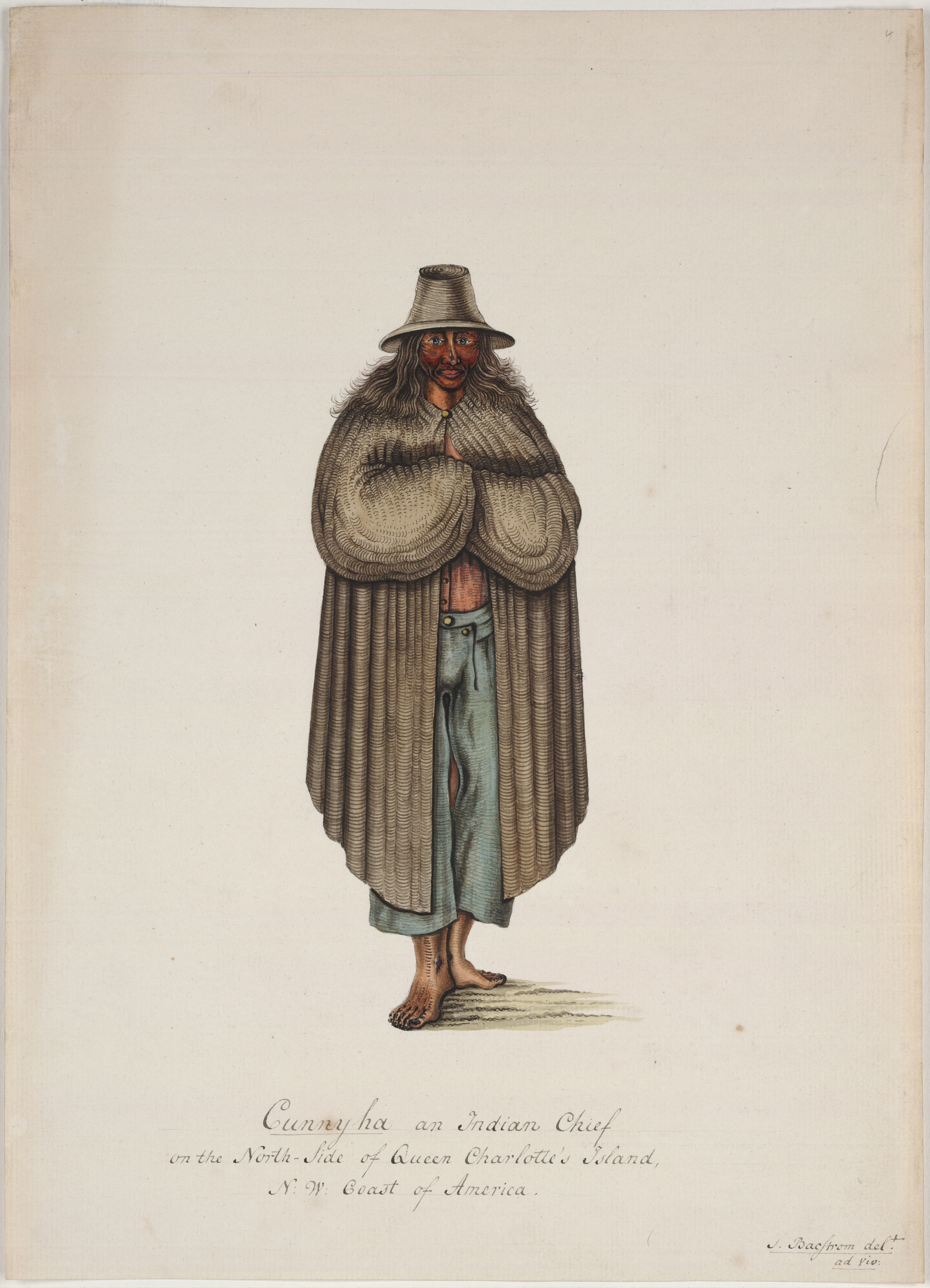
Cunnyha an Indian Chief on the North-Side of Queen Charlotte's Island, N.W. Coast of America,

Cuneah, also Gunia, Cunneah, Cunnyha, Cunniah, Coneehaw, Connehaw, Cunneaw (Haida: Gəniyá (fl. 1789–1801), was the chief of Kiusta, a town at the northwestern tip of Graham Island during the era of the Maritime Fur Trade in Haida Gwaii off the North Coast of British Columbia, Canada. This town was an important port of call for acquiring sea otter skins in the early years of the maritime fur trade. Cuneah seems to have avoided the violence that plagued other Haida chiefs, like Koyah.

George Dixon visited the Kiusta area in 1787 and called the inlet where he traded Cloak Bay, for the large number of beautiful sea otter cloaks he acquired there from Cuneah's people. The first European to go ashore and meet Cuneah was William Douglas, in June 1789. In addition to trading goods, Cuneah and Douglas exchanged names, a gesture of good will and honour among the Haida. From that time on the log books of various traders mention the chief as "Douglas Cuneah".

A number of American traders visited, one of whom described Cuneah as "humane" and "friendly". Unfortunately the details about Cuneah after Douglas's visit are difficult to trace due to the fragmentary nature of the historic material available. Robert Haswell of the ship Columbia Rediviva under Robert Gray wrote an account of events at Kiusta. About Cuneah, Haswell wrote that he was "a very good old fellow - his wife was off ship and had vast authority over every person alongside."

Sigismund Bacstrom drew a picture of Cuneah's eldest daughter, Koota-Hilslinga, in 1793.

Another description of Cuneah is found in Bishop's journal of the ship Ruby. He describes Cuneah as chief of the whole district in 1795, probably meaning the area of Kaigani Strait and much of the north coast of Graham Island. Cuneah had a major influence over the Haida of Kiusta, Dadens and Kaigani. The chiefs Eldarge, Cowe, Skilkada, and Shakes were secondary to Cuneah.

By 1811 Kiusta had lost its place of prominence in the fur trade, and Chief Cuneah was either very old or dead. His successor seems to have kept the name and title, but lost the chiefdom.

== See also ==
- Cumshewa
