= Kiusta =

Kiusta K’yuusda
- Historic Haida village
- Interactive map of Kiusta
- Country: Canada
- Province: British Columbia
- Haida Nation: Haida Gwaii

Kiusta (Haida: K’yuusda) located on Haida Gwaii is the oldest Northern Haida village and the site of first recorded contact between the Haida and Europeans in 1774. Haida lived in this village for thousands of years, due to the sheltered nature of its location it was used for boats offloading, especially in rough waters. Kiusta is one of the oldest archeological sites of human use in British Columbia, and continues to be a site for cultural revitalisation.

== Name ==
The name K’yuusda means "where the trail comes out," in reference to a trail used from T’áalan Stl’áng to the village. The trail is substantial and is still used between these villages on the west coast of Graham Island.

== Village site ==
The village of Kiusta lies on a sheltered beach facing Cloak Bay on the northwest corner of Graham Island, opposite Langara Island. It faces north onto Parry Passage, noted for its tidal currents, but is well protected by Marchand Reef along its northern end.

== History ==
Kiusta is one of the few sites that has been archeologically dated and "in 1986, archeologists from the Haida Gwaii Museum uncovered campfire charcoal dating back 10,400 years" denoting it as "one of the oldest known sites of human activity in British Columbia."

=== Early European references: contact with Kiusta ===
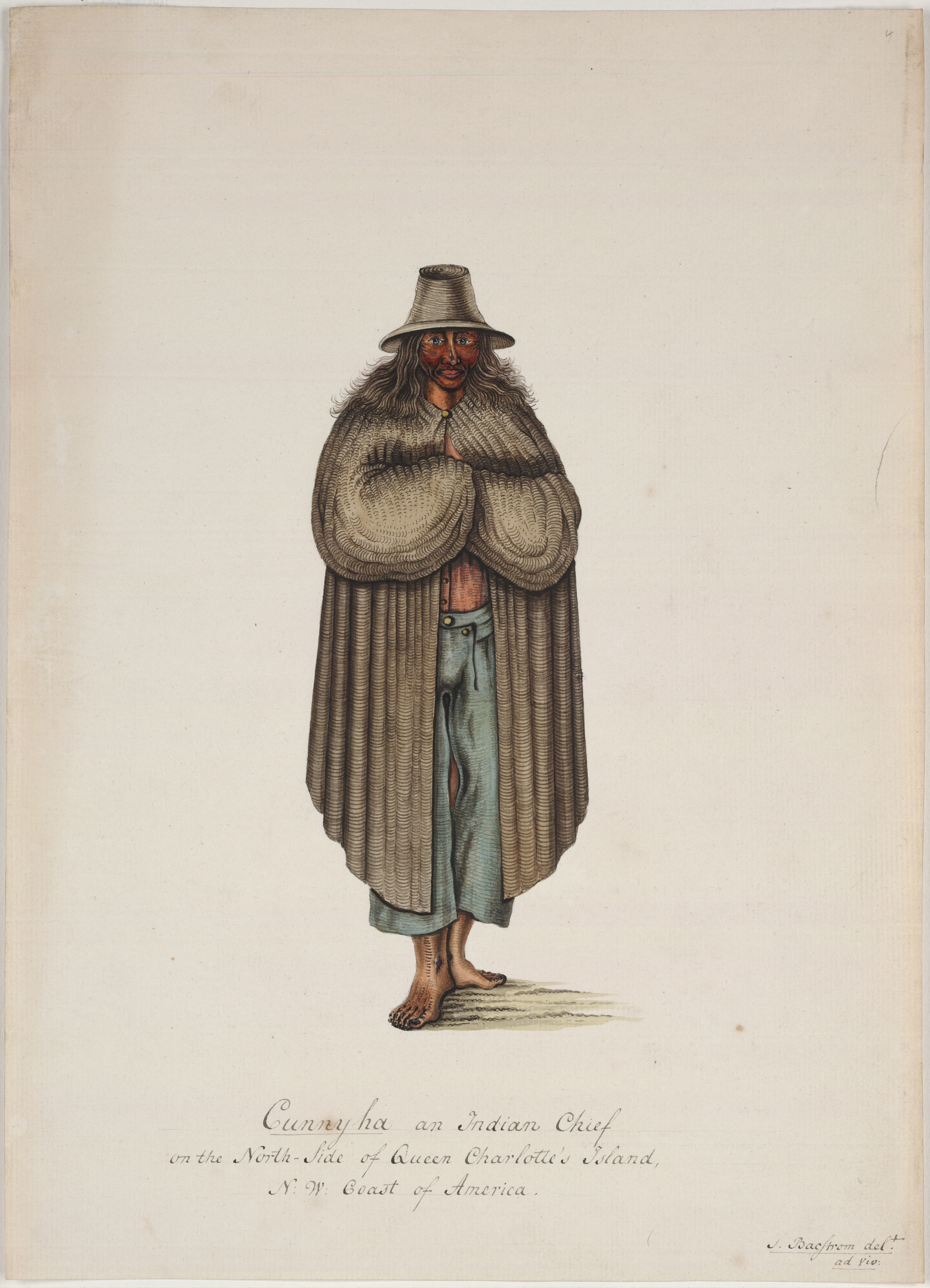
1793 portrait of Chief Cuneah by Sigismund Bacstrom

During the maritime fur trade era Chief Cuneah was the primary leader of Kiusta and had influence over the entire region. George Dixon visited the Kiusta area in 1787 and called the inlet where he traded "Cloak Bay", for the large number of beautiful sea otter cloaks he acquired there. The first European to visit Kiusta and meet Cuneah was William Douglas, in June 1789.

Kiusta was first portrayed in 1799, in a drawing in the journal of the ship Eliza. The illustration provided a panorama of the town from the water.

=== Smallpox epidemic: 1830s ===
In the late 1830s an epidemic of smallpox ravaged the North Coast resulting in the death of more than half the Haida (though others have estimated the deaths to be closer to 80 to 90 per cent of the population.) With the reduced population, trade became monopolized by a smaller number of chiefs. Over the next quarter-century other chiefs, including Chief Edenshaw of Kiusta, had to establish stronger links with other chiefs as a result of their remote location and dwindling population and many gravitated to Masset where there were missionaries and other service and commercial people.

=== Abalone trade ===
Evidence of trade in abalone shells is based in part on recovered abalone shells from a site in Kiusta. it is suggested that traders imported California-area abalone shell because "they had noticed local peoples' use of "paler, smaller" abalone. Such importation was likely done by American traders who dominated the sea otter pelt trade in the Haida Gwaii area from the mid-1790s to the 1840s (Lyle Dick, Parks Canada, pers. comm. 2001)." This trade is important as the "Haida used abalone shell fragments for personal adornment including labrets, jewellery, appliqué on garments, inlay into personal ceremonial dress such as frontlets, and inlay in argillite carvings for sale (Barbeau 1953). Boas (1898: 15) reports that sometimes pieces were glued directly to the skin for facial decoration.", and some families adopted abalone shells as crests.

=== Edenshaw ===
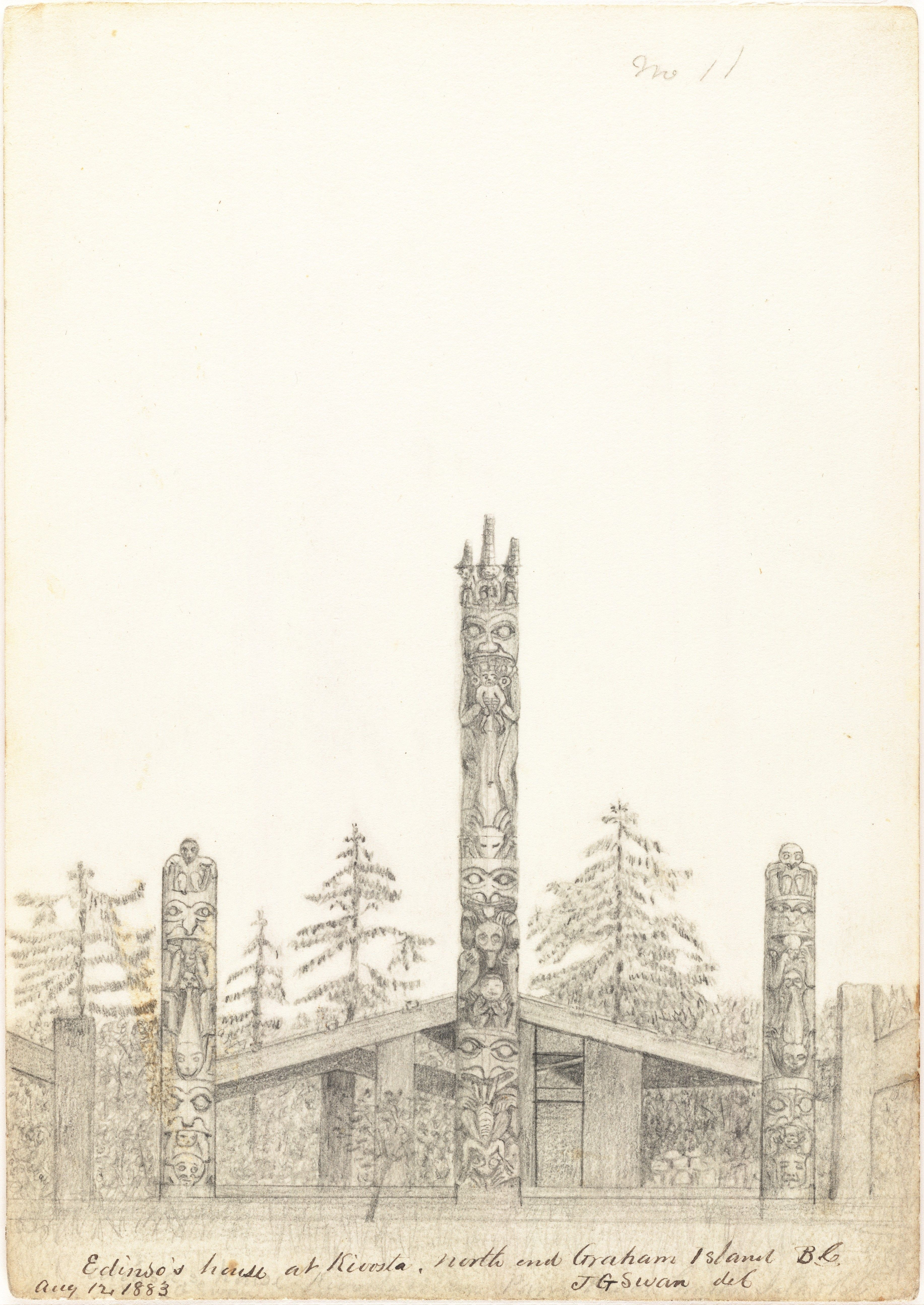
Edenshaw's house in Kiusta in 1883

"The name Edenshaw is first mentioned by fur traders of the 1790s. As with all Haida chiefly names, it was passed down the matrilineal line to a chief's eldest sister's son. At least one Chief Edenshaw preceded the one who dominated most of the nineteenth century, Albert Edward Edenshaw.

Albert Edward Edenshaw built his house in Kiusta around 1840 after the details of the carvings on the corner posts, rafter ends and frontal pole were revealed to him in a dream. He named it Story House, and it stood on the site of his predecessor's dwelling, called Property House. When Story House was finished, Albert Edward gave a great potlatch and invited guests from Masset, Skidegate, Kaisun and Cha'atl, as well as from Kaigani villages. The noted artist Charles Edenshaw, who was Albert Edward's nephew and heir, made a model of Story House for John R. Swanton, and it is now at the American Museum of Natural History in New York.

=== Stastas Eagles ===
The Stastas Eagles are part of the Eagle contingent on the north coast of the Islands. It has been suggested that the Stastas originated outside of the Islands, some probably on the Stikine River and others on the Nass River. Although most of their lands were around Rose Spit, at the northeastern tip of the Islands, and in Naden Harbour, they were town chiefs of Kiusta village at the northwest end.

== Art mapping ==
"In 1966 the National Museum of Man launched a major programme of prehistoric research on the northern coast of British Columbia. …Mapping began at the village of Kiusta in Cloak Bay in 1966… extensive files on each village were compiled, including references to village histories, house ownership, and the identification of the figures on the carved columns commonly known as totem poles. Over ten thousand historical photographs, assembled from museum and archive collections in North America and Europe, proved invaluable in checking the authenticity of the site maps. Careful records of the date and location of the photographs kept by the photographers, most of whom were attached to government survey parties, establish dates for the houses and monuments. The documentary photographs that survive are among the few remaining records which illustrate the richness and variety of Haida monumental art."

== Kiusta revitalisation ==
Three new longhouses built at the site of the ancient village of Kiusta, amidst old poles that stand witness to the great civilization that was here are a testament to resilience and the future. Across the narrow strait separating Kiusta from Langara Island are three floating lodges for sport fishers are anchored. These are part of the Haida plan to manage the salmon resources of the islands to sustain the yield of a renewable resource.

Currently, ’island teens’ can also stay at Lepas Bay for a 2-week "Rediscovery program" to engage in ‘hands-on learning in environmental awareness, hands-on skills and respect for traditional Haida culture’.

== See also ==
- List of Haida villages
