= Cumshewa, British Columbia =

Cumshewa Hlḵinul Llnagaay
- Historic Haida village
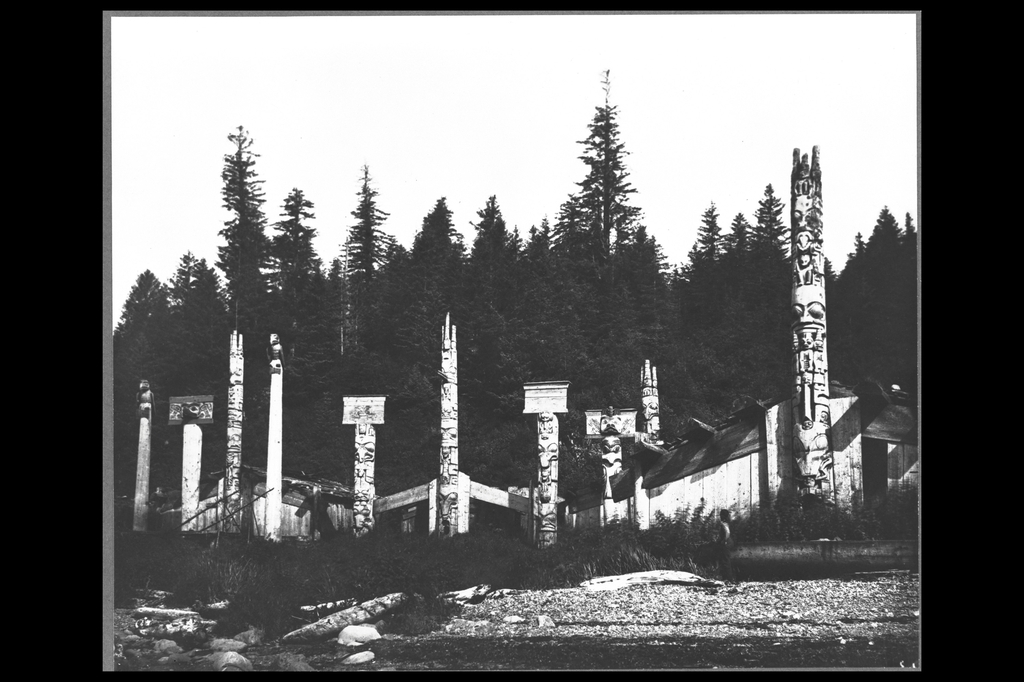
- Cumshewa in 1878.

- Location of Cumshewa in British Columbia
- Coordinates: 53°2′32″N 131°41′40″W
- Country: Canada
- Province: British Columbia
- Region: Haida Gwaii
- Haida Gwaii: Moresby Island

Cumshewa is a former village of the Haida people located on the north flank of Cumshewa Inlet in the Haida Gwaii of the North Coast of British Columbia, Canada. It is named for Cumshewa, an important Haida chief during the maritime fur trade.

The name was long in use on marine charts but was made official in the British Columbia gazette on April 6, 1926. The last few inhabitants of Cumshewa were encouraged to move to Skidegate in 1926. The location of the village is now within the Kunx̱alas Heritage Site/Conservancy.

== Name ==
Cumshewa is a Heiltsuk word meaning "rich at the mouth of the river". The ancient Haida name for the village was Hlḵinul Llnagaay, anglicized as Thlinul, or Tlkinool by John Work during a Hudson's Bay Company census in 1839.

== See also ==
- New Clew, British Columbia (Tanu)
- List of Haida villages
