= Dadens =

- Village
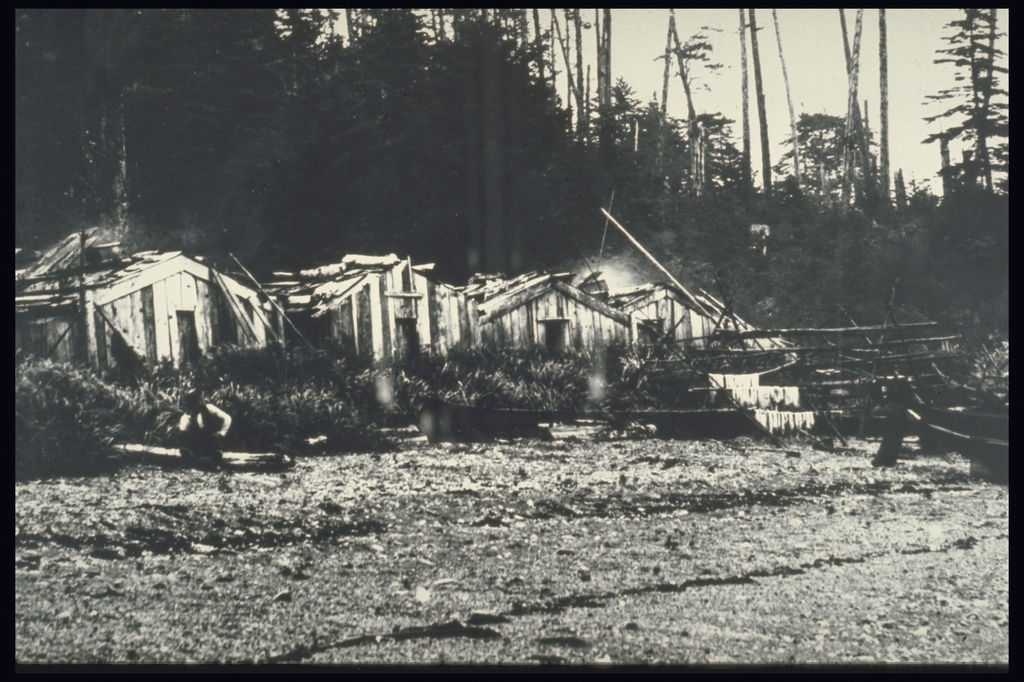
- A house in Dadens in 1878

- Location of Dadens in British Columbia
- Coordinates: 54°11′13″N 132°59′6″W
- Country: Canada
- Province: British Columbia

Government
  - Body: Haida Nation

Dadens (Haida: Daadans), also referred to as Tartenee and Tatense by some early European settlers, and Tatense Reserve 16 under the Indian Act, is a village on the southern coast of Langara Island (Haida: K'íis Gwáayaay) belonging to the Haida Nation on the archipelago Haida Gwaii, British Columbia, Canada. Dadens was once a popular trading post for the North Pacific fur trade among European traders in the late 18th century, due to its size and accessibility. Dadens is no longer used by families year-round, but it was used as a fishing village during the summer months by many Haida until the 1950s and 1960s, and is still used to a limited extent today. There have been multiple migrations of families from Dadens to Southeast Alaska and these people are now known as the Kiagani Haida.

== People ==
Haida families broadly belong to one of two matrilineal moieties or clans; those being the Eagle and the Raven clans, however, each family group has their own unique lineages and sub lineages represented by symbols or crests. At the first point of European contact in 1789, Dadens was owned by the Middle-town people Raven Clan (Haida: Yahgu Laanaas).

== European relations & fur trade ==
Initial contact

The first recorded mention of Dadens was in 1774, though not by name, by the explorer Juan Perez, who sailed past it. And it was not until 1789 that there was a recorded landing, achieved by Captain William Douglas. When Douglas arrived he did not have much success in trading, due to the poor quality iron his ship was carrying. From the accounts at this time, it was still a fairly large village, with a number of people inhabiting it.

John Bartlett arrived at the village in 1791, and left with the first, possibly only surviving sketch of a house and frontal pole from Dadens, though John Meares had taken note of a pole during his voyage in 1789. Joseph Ingraham landed in Dadens in the same year, and described the village and its poles in his journal. He met three chiefs there, and identified two of them as gu.uu (whom he referred to as Cow), and Goi, but did not record a name for the last. His journal was the first to describe two large poles, not just one, both around four storeys. However, it is unclear what the second one was representative of. He also described a house with "an excavated interior" and support planks. Almost immediately afterward the first French vessel arrived, captained by Etienne Marchand. An officer on his boat reportedly saw a group of people in canoes go ashore, so the ship quickly followed suit. At this time there were only two houses left in the village, but they were still occupied by a large number of people.

Eight years later Captain James Rowan on his ship Eliza arrived. He traded a hostage with the people of Dadens, to ensure peace was kept between the two groups. The ship clerk Samuel Berling (or John Burling, in some literature), copied what 'Mr. Bumstead,' who was sent on land as the hostage, described. There were still only two houses standing at this time, but he also claimed there was a surprisingly large number of people living in them, many of whom he identifies as female slaves. Here he met Yaahl Daajee, the chief, which Berling transcribed as 'Altatse,' and is written as Eldarge in at least one source. According to this journal the two houses belonged to this chief and his brother, who is not named.

== Emigration to southern shores of Alaska ==
There have been multiple migrations of families from Dadens to south east Alaska in Haida history. Ethnographers and anthropologists have speculated that some of these family groups emigrated to Alaska post-European contact. Further, Florence Davidson in During My Time recalls gatherings at Dadens in the 1900s.

=== Kaigani ===
The Haida who moved to Alaska became known as the Alaskan Haida, Ñ'íis Ýaat'áay, or colloquially as the Kaigani Haida. The Tlingit Peoples also live in Alaska. Today, these two distinct nations have banded together for political reasons, namely due to the colonization of their ancestral lands by the British and Canadian Governments and their mutual pursuit of Land Entitlement and sovereign nationhood. The organize under the Central Council Tlingit and Haida Indian Tribes of Alaska. The Council of the Haida Nation (CHN) is the Indigenous governance on Haida Gwaii.

== 21st century ==
While Dadens is currently uninhabited, it has not been abandoned by the Haida. There continue to be hereditary chiefs of the village, a title passed down from one member of a clan to another, through the matrilineal line, who do not live in the village, but are tasked with protecting it. As of 2025, the hereditary chief is Darin Swanson, whose Haida name is Ginaawaan, and who is a potlatched Chief and member of the Hereditary Chiefs Council.

Another notable chief was Claude Davidson (1924-1991), son of Florence Davidson, an artist and father to Robert Davidson and Reg Davidson, both of whom are also artists. He was chief from 1986 until his death.

The village is protected by a Watchman, and to visit, as with all historic villages in Haida Gwaii, one must first obtain a permit.

== See also ==
- List of Haida Villages
- Chief Cuneah
- Haida Gwaii
- Fur Trade
- Colonization
- Kaigani (trading site)
