= Langara Island =

Island in British Columbia, Canada

Native name: Ḵ'íis Gwáayaay
- Interactive map of Langara Island

Geography
- Coordinates: 54°14′03″N 133°01′13″W
- Archipelago: Haida Gwaii
- Area: 8,080 acres (3,270 ha)

Administration
- Canada

Demographics
- Population: 460

Langara Island, known as Kiis Gwaii to the Haida (Haida: Ḵ'íis Gwáayaay), is the northernmost island of Haida Gwaii in British Columbia, Canada. The island is approximately 8,080 acres (3,270 ha) in size. It is located approximately 45 kilometres (28 mi) south of Alaska.

== History ==
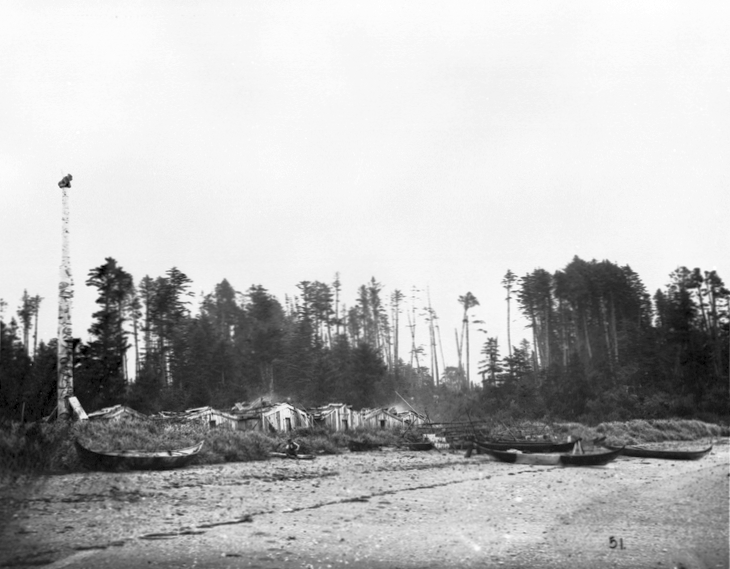
Dadens, Langara Island, 1878

Little is known about its history. It is named after Spanish naval commander Juan de Lángara. During Lángara's period at the head of the Spanish navy, Spanish explorers were charting the coast of what is now British Columbia, and, in their charts, named some land formations after him. Juan José Pérez Hernández was the first European to sight, examine, name, and record these islands. His frigate was the Santiago, which was crewed mostly by Mexicans. In July 1774, he briefly met a group of Haida off the northwestern tip of Langara Island. In 1913 the Langara Light was lit at the northwest corner of the island. It is one of the largest islands from which Norway rats have been eradicated. The eradication campaign for R. norvegicus was begun in July 1995 using anti-coagulant bait and the island was declared free of rats in May 1997.

On 6 September 2018, the Haida Legend sank off Langara Island. The vessel had been fishing halibut and the cause of the sinking is unknown. All members of the crew were rescued.

== Climate ==
Langara Island has an oceanic climate (Cfb, bordering on Cfc) with cool to mild summers and very cool, rainy winters with chilly nights.

Climate data for Langara Island, 1981–2010 normals, extremes 1936–present
Month	Jan	Feb	Mar	Apr	May	Jun	Jul	Aug	Sep	Oct	Nov	Dec	Year
Record high humidex	15.0	13.7	13.4	18.6	22.7	23.0	24.3	28.2	24.8	22.9	16.6	12.7	28.2
Record high °C (°F)	13.7 (56.7)	12.8 (55.0)	15.5 (59.9)	19.4 (66.9)	25.0 (77.0)	31.2 (88.2)	22.2 (72.0)	25.8 (78.4)	22.8 (73.0)	20.0 (68.0)	15.0 (59.0)	13.5 (56.3)	31.2 (88.2)
Mean daily maximum °C (°F)	5.8 (42.4)	6.0 (42.8)	6.9 (44.4)	8.9 (48.0)	11.0 (51.8)	13.2 (55.8)	14.8 (58.6)	15.8 (60.4)	14.5 (58.1)	11.2 (52.2)	7.5 (45.5)	6.1 (43.0)	10.1 (50.2)
Daily mean °C (°F)	4.0 (39.2)	4.1 (39.4)	4.8 (40.6)	6.3 (43.3)	8.5 (47.3)	10.8 (51.4)	12.7 (54.9)	13.6 (56.5)	12.3 (54.1)	9.2 (48.6)	5.6 (42.1)	4.3 (39.7)	8.0 (46.4)
Mean daily minimum °C (°F)	2.2 (36.0)	2.1 (35.8)	2.5 (36.5)	3.7 (38.7)	6.0 (42.8)	8.4 (47.1)	10.6 (51.1)	11.4 (52.5)	10.0 (50.0)	7.1 (44.8)	3.7 (38.7)	2.5 (36.5)	5.9 (42.6)
Record low °C (°F)	−14.4 (6.1)	−12.0 (10.4)	−11.7 (10.9)	−3.3 (26.1)	0.0 (32.0)	3.3 (37.9)	5.6 (42.1)	5.6 (42.1)	1.1 (34.0)	−4.5 (23.9)	−15.9 (3.4)	−12.8 (9.0)	−15.9 (3.4)
Record low wind chill	−25.3	−23.2	−20.8	−11.0	0.0	0.0	0.0	0.0	−5.3	−10.3	−27.5	−23.6	−27.5
Average precipitation mm (inches)	205.8 (8.10)	140.6 (5.54)	149.8 (5.90)	139.8 (5.50)	109.3 (4.30)	94.2 (3.71)	93.5 (3.68)	134.0 (5.28)	190.5 (7.50)	256.6 (10.10)	230.0 (9.06)	223.2 (8.79)	1,967.2 (77.45)
Average snowfall cm (inches)	19.9 (7.8)	13.1 (5.2)	11.1 (4.4)	3.2 (1.3)	0.5 (0.2)	0 (0)	0 (0)	0 (0)	0 (0)	1.6 (0.6)	7.8 (3.1)	12.1 (4.8)	69.3 (27.3)
Average precipitation days (≥ 0.2 mm)	25.2	21.0	23.5	22.1	19.8	18.5	19.5	20.0	22.1	26.3	25.2	25.9	269.0
Average rainy days (≥ 0.2 mm)	23.2	20.1	23.0	21.0	19.4	17.4	18.4	18.0	20.9	25.3	24.8	24.4	256.0
Average snowy days (≥ 0.2 cm)	4.4	3.6	4.3	1.5	0.23	0	0	0	0.04	0.73	2.7	4.2	21.8
Source: Environment Canada

== See also ==
- List of islands of British Columbia

== Publications ==
- Kaiser, G.W.; Taylor, R.H.; Buck, P.D.; Elliott, J.E.; Howald, G.R.; Drever, M.C. 1997. The Langara Island Seabird Habitat Recovery Project: Eradication of Norway Rats – 1993–1997. Technical Report Series No. 304, Canadian Wildlife Service, Pacific and Yukon Region, British Columbia.
