= Thomas Humphrey Metcalfe =

American maritime fur trader

- Born: c. 1771
- Died: March 16, 1790 (aged 18–19); Island of Hawaiʻi
- Cause of death: Murder
- Occupation: Maritime fur trader
- Father: Simon Metcalfe

Thomas Humphrey Metcalfe (also spelled Metcalf) (c. 1771 – March 16, 1790) was an American maritime fur trader who worked with his father, Simon Metcalfe. After being separated from his father in a storm, Thomas sailed a small schooner with a crew of four from the vicinity of China to Nootka Sound on Vancouver Island where he was arrested by the Spanish. After being released he sailed to Hawaii, hoping to find his father. Instead, he was attacked and killed by Native Hawaiians in revenge for misdeeds committed by his father just days before.

== Early family life ==
Little is known about Thomas Metcalfe's life apart from the events of about 1787–1790. Thomas's father, Simon was born in London, England, in the mid-18th century. In 1763 he married Catherine Humphrey. They immigrated to the Province of New York about 1765.

== Fur trading voyage ==
In the late 1780s Simon Metcalfe owned a 190-ton brig named Eleanora. In February 1787 he sailed from New York City with his two teenage sons, Thomas and Robert, on a trading voyage to China.

The intention was to take a cargo of tea from China to New York City. But while in Guangzhou (Canton) or Macau, China, the Metcalfes heard about the possibility of making large profits trading sea otter furs in China. Simon Metcalfe decided to sail to the Pacific Northwest Coast to acquire sea otter furs before returning to China to buy tea. An English captain recommended taking a second, smaller ship to serve as tender and to more easily navigate narrow fjords.

To this end, Simon Metcalfe purchased a 26-ton schooner in Macau. This vessel was given the name Fair American and put under the command of Thomas Metcalfe. The little schooner was 33 feet (10 m) long and 8 feet (2.4 m) wide and had a crew of four, plus Thomas. The schooner was undecked but copper-bottomed. When one of George Vancouver's officers saw the Fair American, a few years later, he was "Stuck with Surprize, at so small a Vessel having been employ'd on such a Commercial pursuit as she had been, and to have travers'd Such an immense tract of Boisterous Ocean as she had done."

== Separation and voyage to Nootka Sound ==
The Eleanora, under Simon Metcalfe, and the Fair American, under Thomas Metcalfe, left Macau in May 1789, intending to sail together to Nootka Sound on Vancouver Island, present-day British Columbia, Canada, but they were separated during a storm in the South China Sea. Young Thomas Metcalfe was left to find his own way across the ocean in his tiny vessel. His only navigational instrument was a compass, which broke en route. His only guide was a copy of a map made by James Cook. Cook's map provided a general impression of the North Pacific coast but lacked detail.

Thomas sailed north along the Japanese archipelago, the Kuriles, and the Aleutian Islands. After 42 days at sea he stopped at a Russian fur-trade post on Unalaska Island, where the Russian commander Potak Zaikov provided flour and dried fish. Thomas continued down the Pacific Northwest Coast, acquiring some furs through trade with some Tlingit and Haida villages, before arriving at Nootka Sound. In the vicinity of Dixon Entrance he encountered and briefly met with John Kendrick, who was sailing Lady Washington to Haida Gwaii.

According to Esteban José Martínez, the Spanish commander at Nootka Sound, Thomas Metcalfe's Fair American arrived with "her mast sprung and her sails split", and that the schooner had no provisions left but only "some casks of water and some 65 otter skins". In addition, Martínez noted that Thomas Metcalfe had "no written passport or instructions and no papers except his diary", and that his sole compass was broken.

Martínez, an experienced sailor and captain who had voyaged to Alaska the year before, was impressed. About Thomas he wrote: "He is but a boy, who under his father's orders undertook such an extended voyage. He and his men were exposed to the greatest dangers from rough weather and lack of provisions. They sailed over the open sea for more than three thousand leagues [over 7,700 miles (12,400 km)]. They were exposed to a thousand insults from the heathen and driven by necessity had to seek a meeting with the Spaniards, from which they expected relief."

== Capture at Nootka Sound ==
In 1789 both Simon Metcalfe and his son Thomas Humphrey Metcalfe were caught up in the Nootka Crisis at Nootka Sound. As increasing numbers of trading ships visited Nootka Sound, Spain decided to assert its claim to the Pacific Northwest Coast. In early 1789 a Spanish force arrived and established Santa Cruz de Nuca and Fort San Miguel.

The Spanish naval officer Esteban José Martínez was in command and had orders to detain all foreign vessels. He seized the British merchant ships Argonaut, under James Colnett, Princess Royal, under Thomas Hudson, and North West America, under Robert Funter. Martínez did not detain the U.S. ships Columbia Rediviva and Lady Washington, under John Kendrick and Robert Gray.

On 20 October 1789, the Fair American under Thomas Metcalfe reached Nootka Sound. Esteban José Martínez seized the schooner and arrested the crew. A few days later Simon Metcalfe approached Nootka Sound and the Eleanora was almost captured as well, but he managed to escape. Martínez took the Fair American and her crew to the Spanish naval base at San Blas, Mexico, arriving on 6 December 1789.

Although Martínez did not seize the American ships Columbia Rediviva or Lady Washington, and despite his admiration for Thomas Metcalfe's seamanship and his pity for the sorry state of the men, he decided to arrest Metcalfe and his crew and take the Fair American to Mexico, where higher authorities could decide what should be done. In order for the Fair American to make the voyage to San Blas, Martínez provided compasses, cordage, yards, and a new main-mast. During the voyage to San Blas, Thomas and his crew were under arrest and the vessel was captained by John Kendrick Jr, who had come to Nootka Sound with his father, John Kendrick. While at Nootka, John Junior had converted to Catholicism, changed his name to Juan, announced his intention to obtain Spanish citizenship, and was hired by the Spanish Navy as a piloto.

On the way to San Blas a storm forced the Fair American under Juan Kendrick to seek shelter at Monterey, California. Thomas Metcalfe and his crew spent about ten days in prison in Monterey. Then they continued south, arriving at San Blas on 6 December 1789, where Metcalfe and his men were again imprisoned. The Spanish viceroy, Juan Vicente de Güemes, 2nd Count of Revillagigedo, was worried about the possibility of international crisis sparked by the seizure of three British and one U.S. merchant ships. Deciding to focus solely on Britain, he ordered the immediate release of Thomas Metcalfe, his men and ship. Later the viceroy decided it would be better to escort the Fair American back to Nootka Sound before releasing her. But by the time the news reached San Blas, Thomas Metcalfe was already sailing the Fair American to Hawaii.

== Release and Olowalu Massacre in Hawaii ==
The Metcalfes had planned to spend the winter in the Hawaiian Islands, which were independent and only just beginning to be visited by outsiders. After Simon Metcalfe evaded capture at Nootka Sound he traded for sea otter furs in Haida Gwaii before making for Hawaii. After being released from San Blas, Thomas Metcalfe sailed the Fair American to Hawaii, hoping to join his father.

The Eleanora under Simon Metcalfe arrived in the islands first, in the winter of 1789–90. In Kohala on the island of Hawaiʻi, Simon Metcalfe was greeted by local chief Kameʻeiamoku and trading ensued. There was some altercation between Simon and Kameʻeiamoku. The details are lost except that Simon had the chief flogged. He then sailed to the neighboring island of Maui to trade along the coast. Due to Simon's treatment of him, Kameʻeiamoku vowed revenge on whatever ship next came his way.

On the coast of Maui a boat and sailor from the Eleanora went missing. It was discovered that the boat had been stolen. Simon Metcalfe's reaction became known as the Olowalu Massacre. He sailed to the village of the suspected thieves, Olowalu. Feigning peaceful intent, he invited the villagers to the Eleanora for trade while he had his cannon loaded with ball and shot. When many canoes had gathered at the ship Simon ordered a broadside fired at point-blank range, which blasted the canoes to pieces. About 100 Native Hawaiian men, women, and children were killed and a great many more wounded.

== Death and capture of the Fair American ==
Meanwhile, Thomas Metcalfe and the Fair American arrived at Kawaihae Bay, Island of Hawaiʻi, where shortly before his father Simon had flogged Chief Kameʻeiamoku and the chief had vowed revenge upon the next ship.

That next ship was the Fair American, captained by Thomas Metcalfe, the son of the very person who had so offended the chief, although nobody was aware of that fact at the time. The schooner was manned by only four sailors plus its relatively inexperienced captain. On 16 March 1790, Kameʻeiamoku's men easily captured the schooner. Thomas Metcalfe and his crew were killed. The only survivor was Isaac Davis, who was badly injured but for some reason spared. Kameʻeiamoku appropriated the ship, its guns, ammunition, and other valuable goods, as well as Isaac Davis himself. At the time no one was aware of the family relation between the captain of the Fair American and Simon Metcalfe, whose Eleanora was anchored at Kealakekua Bay, about 30 miles (50 km) away. The Fair American and Davis were eventually given to King Kamehameha I.

== Aftermath ==
After the Olowalu Massacre, Simon Metcalfe sailed back to the island of Hawai'i, arriving a day after the capture of the Fair American and the death of Thomas Metcalfe. At Kealakekua Bay Simon Metcalfe began what seemed to be friendly trade for provisions. When Kamehameha learned about the capture of the Fair American he prohibited further contact between the natives and the Eleanora. Simon Metcalfe sent his boatswain John Young ashore to investigate. Young was captured, and Metcalfe was puzzled by the sudden silence. He waited two days for Young to return, firing guns in hope that the sound would guide Young back. Finally, sensing danger or becoming frustrated, Metcalfe left and set sail for China, not knowing that his son had been killed not far away. He never learned about the attack on the Fair American or the fate of his son.

These events mark a turning point in Hawaiian history. John Young and Isaac Davis were instrumental in Kamehameha's military ventures and his eventual conquest and unification of the Hawaiian Islands. Young and Davis became respected translators and military advisors for Kamehameha. Their skill in gunnery, as well as the cannon from the Fair American, helped Kamehameha win many battles, including the Battle of Kepaniwai, later in 1790, where the forces of Maui were defeated. Young and Davis married members of the royal family, raised families and received valuable lands.

Simon Metcalfe continued to trade around the Pacific Ocean and Indian Ocean for another four years. In 1792 he purchased a small French brig at Port Louis, Isle de France (Mauritius) to serve as a tender to Eleanora. He named this brig Ino and appointed his younger son Robert to command her. When the Eleanora sank in the Indian Ocean in the winter of 1792–93, Metcalfe took command of the Ino.

In August 1794 Simon Metcalfe visited Houston Stewart Channel, at the southern end of Haida Gwaii, and anchored in Coyah's Sound near the village of Ninstints. Friendly trading with the local Haida natives of Chief Koyah began. Metcalfe let a great number come aboard the Ino. The Haida took advantage of their superiority in numbers and attacked. Simon Metcalfe and his entire crew, except one, were killed.
