= John Kendrick Jr. =

- Born: before April 1772; Cape Cod, Massachusetts
- Occupations: Maritime fur trader, merchant, Spanish Navy officer
- Known for: Officer on Columbia Rediviva, captain of Union
- Parent(s): John Kendrick and Huldah Pease

John Kendrick Jr. (born before April 1772), also known as Juan Kendrick, was the eldest son of John Kendrick, the American sea captain who commanded the first United States expedition to the Pacific Northwest. John Jr.'s exact date of birth is not known, but he was baptized in April, 1772, in Cape Cod, Massachusetts.

In 1787 John Kendrick Senior enlisted his two eldest sons, John Jr. and Solomon Kendrick, to come with him on his expedition to the Pacific Northwest aboard the ship Columbia Rediviva, which was accompanied by Lady Washington, under Robert Gray. John Kendrick Jr. was an officer, probably the fifth mate, and given an advance payment of £4 10s. The younger Solomon was a sailor before the mast and given a lesser advance of £1 10s.

In 1789 the Columbia and Lady Washington were at the Spanish naval outpost Santa Cruz de Nuca in Nootka Sound, during the start of the Nootka Crisis. While there John Kendrick Jr. decided to leave his father and join the Spanish Navy. He converted to Catholicism and was known as Juan Kendrick during his time with the Spanish Navy. He served the Naval Department of San Blas, Nayarit, which was in charge of naval operations on the west coast of North America.

In late 1794 John Kendrick Senior, after several voyages across the Pacific, encountered his son, "Juan" at Nootka Sound. Juan Kendrick had come to Nootka Sound as master of the Spanish frigate Aranzazu. The two exchanged information, including the news that Juan's brother Solomon Kendrick was probably dead. He had been part of the crew of the Resolution, which had disappeared and was presumed lost. Later Juan Kendrick learned that the Resolution had been attacked by Haida under Chief Cumshewa and Koyah, and the crew killed, including Solomon Kendrick. In 1799, as a crew member aboard the Eliza under Captain James Rowan, and no longer with the Spanish Navy, John Kendrick Jr. and others exacted revenge upon the Haida.

After Eliza returned to New England John Kendrick Jr. joined the crew of the maritime fur trading vessel Juno, which under Captain Gibbs sailed from Bristol, Rhode Island in 1801 and arrived in the Pacific Northwest in 1802. In early 1803 the Juno, with the trading ship Mary, unsuccessfully attempted to rescue the two survivors of the Boston, who had been enslaved to Chief Maquinna of Nootka Sound. One of them, John R. Jewitt, became famous for publishing an account of his experience as a slave. He and the other survivors, John Thompson, were rescued in 1805 by Samuel Hill, captain of the Lydia.

After acquiring a cargo of furs the Juno sailed to Canton, China, and then back to New England, arriving in May, 1804. Details of the voyage are not well known. John Kendrick Jr. may have been in command during the return trip.

== See also ==
- List of ships in British Columbia
