= Houston Stewart Channel =

Coordinates: 52°9′N 131°7′W

Houston Stewart Channel is a strait in Haida Gwaii, British Columbia, Canada. It separates Moresby Island and Kunghit Island.

Houston Stewart Channel was given its name by James Charles Prevost in 1853, in honour of William Houston Stewart, his predecessor aboard HMS Virago. Maritime fur trader George Dixon called it Ibberston Sound in 1787. American fur traders called it Barrell Sound, so-named by John Kendrick and Robert Gray in 1789, in honour of Joseph Barrell, one of the owners of the ships Columbia Rediviva and Lady Washington. It was also known as Koya's Straits, after Chief Koyah of the Haida.

The Channel was the location for conflict between the Haida and two visiting fur trading vessels in 1794, the Ino and the Resolution.
