= Olowalu, Hawaii =

- Census-designated place
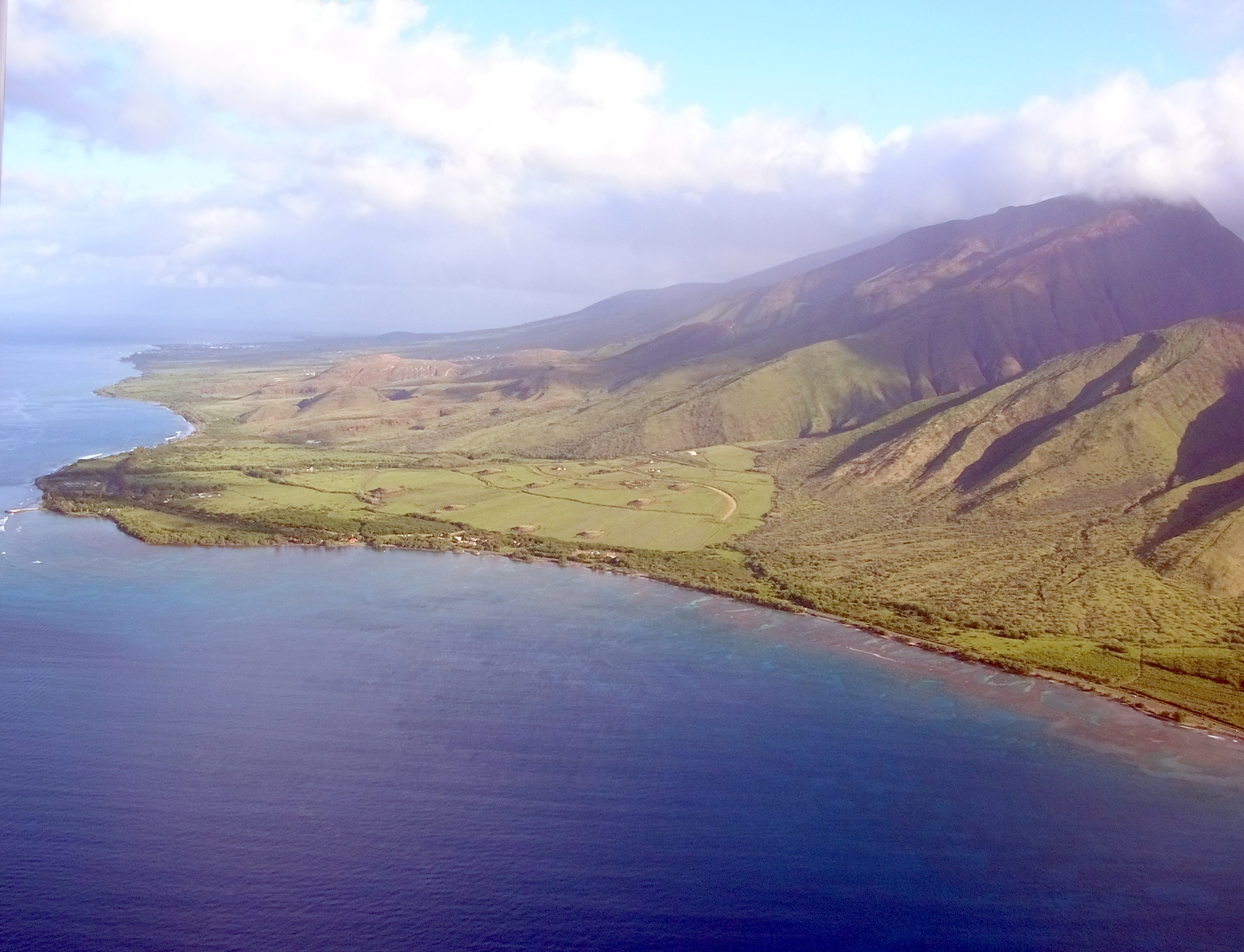
- A view of Olowalu
- Interactive map of Olowalu, Hawaii
- Coordinates: 20°48′39″N 156°37′20″W

Government
  - Body: Maui County Council
  - Mayor: Alan Arakawa
  - Hawaii Senate: Rosalyn Baker
  - Hawaii House of Representatives: Angus McKelvey
  - U.S. House: Kai Kahele
  - U.S. Senate: Brian Schatz

Area
  - Total: 7.6 km^{2} (2.94 sq mi)
  - Land: 7.6 km^{2} (2.94 sq mi)
- Elevation: 6.1 m (20 ft)

Population (2020)
  - Total: 100
  - Density: 13.12/km^{2} (33.97/sq mi)
  - Summer (DST): UTC12 (Hawaii)
- ZIP Code: 96761 (Lahaina)
- Area code: 808

Olowalu (Hawaiian for 'many hills') is a community on the west side of the island of Maui in the state of Hawaii. It is located about 4 miles (6 km) south of Lahaina on the Honoapiʻilani Highway. It is a census-designated place (CDP), with a population at the 2020 census of 100.

It once sustained a large population, governed by the high chiefess Kalola, daughter of Maui ruler Kekaulike, and grandmother of Keopuolani. It was home to a traditional farming community until the arrival of the Europeans, who replaced it with a sugarcane plantation. The massacre in 1790, as well as the labor-intensive sandalwood trade up-country, contributed to the site's decline. A substantial real estate development is under consideration for the area. The area is home to one of Hawaii's most striking reefs.

== Puʻu Honua ==
From ancient times, Olowalu was considered a place of refuge, or puʻu honua, by Hawaiians. Persons pursued for committing an offense against a family group or an ali'i (royal) were untouchable once they stepped inside its borders. Violating sanctuary was punishable by death. For Pacific Island cultures, maintaining a peaceful order was a deep cultural tenet. For people on Maui, Olowalu created an interval of space and time to resolve disputes.

== Massacre ==
Olowalu Massacre
- Location: Maui
- Date: 1790
- Attack type: Massacre
- Weapon: Naval artillery
- Deaths: ~100 killed
- Perpetrator: Simon Metcalfe

In 1789, Captain Simon Metcalfe set out on a maritime fur trading mission with two ships: the large Eleanora, and the tender Fair American, a schooner under command of his son Thomas Humphrey Metcalfe. The Fair American was captured by the Spanish during the Nootka Crisis and taken to Mexico, but quickly released. The Metcalfes had earlier agreed to rendezvous in the Hawaiian Islands at Kealakekua Bay.

The Eleanora had arrived at the Island of Hawaiʻi by January 1790, and met chief Kameʻeiamoku who boarded the ship to welcome them. Something he did must have offended Simon Metcalfe, who had the chief flogged. This was to have severe consequences later. The Eleanora then sailed north to the island of Maui to trade and resupply. One night a small boat was stolen and the night watchman was killed. Captain Metcalfe fired his cannons into the village, and captured a few Hawaiians who told him the boat was taken by people from the village of Olowalu.

He sailed to Olowalu but found that boat had been broken up for its nails. Nails were treasured in ancient Hawaii, which lacked metal smelting technology. Metcalfe invited the villagers to meet the ship, indicating he wanted to trade with them. However, he had all the cannons loaded and ready on the side where he directed the canoes to approach. They opened fire, killing about one hundred Hawaiians, and wounded many others.

About five or six weeks later the Fair American arrived at the Island of Hawaiʻi, where Kameʻeiamoku was waiting at Kaʻūpūlehu. The schooner's crew of five were easily overwhelmed and four were killed, including Thomas Metcalfe. The lone survivor was Isaac Davis. King Kamehameha I found out about the incident when another sailor, John Young, was captured by Kamehameha's men when he came ashore from the Eleanora to inquire about the Fair American. Kamehameha decided to spare the lives of Davis and Young, who became valued military advisors during his subsequent battles and negotiations with later visitors.

The muskets of the Fair American were salvaged and the schooner refloated. Simon Metcalfe eventually left the island without realizing that he had indirectly caused his own son's death.

== Agriculture ==
Historically, Traditional Hawaiian planters filled these arable lands or kula with food and material crops. Olowalu was known for dry land taro and luxuriant shady breadfruit groves. Other crops such as sweet potato and plants that produced useful materials for clothing, shelter and transport, such as kukui, wauke, 'olona, pili and naio were also plentiful. A meandering stream and network of irrigation ditches nourished these crops.

Throughout most of the 19th and 20th centuries, the area was farmed for sugarcane and a sugar mill operated there.

== Geography ==
The top of the Olowalu ahupuaʻa on Pu'u Kukui reaches 4,457 feet (1,358 m) feet. Its boundaries trace downhill between LThau Mountain on the north and LThau 'Ula Mountain on the south. Olowalu Valley and ʻĪao Valley were linked by an ancient trail until landslides covered the summit.

Olowalu Valley opens up to a fan-shaped alluvial plain.

When the Olowalu hills were cleared of sandalwood and hardwoods, Olowalu Valley became a much drier environment, from mountains to shore. Reforestation of the LThau mountains with sandalwood and 'ohi'a lehua is a major long-range goal of the OCR, and a huge undertaking requiring partnership with the Hawaii Department of Land and Natural Resources (DLNR).

Increased condensation drip in the high forest, added to conservation methods on the kula, are an opportunity to restore past moisture levels to Olowalu Valley. Every activity in an ahupua'a was carried out within the context of a spiritual and cultural belief system that maintained harmony, balance, and peace for both seen and unseen life forms of all creation. Restoring the OCR is a foundation for bringing the concept backpains into present day culture, and redeeming the powerful history of Olowalu as a functioning pu'uhonua.

== Cultural reserve ==
Olowalu Cultural Reserve (OCR) was founded in 1999 as a community-based, non-profit organization to support and promote the revitalization of traditional Hawaiian culture, restoring native habitat, protecting historic and cultural sites and providing educational experiences to students, residents and visitors. In 2006 OCR began restoring 74 acres from Olowalu Valley to the ocean along Olowalu Stream. OCR is restoring the former irrigation systems and loʻi's for cultivating taro and other traditional. It is also creating an educational and cultural puʻuhonua or sanctuary.

== Olowalu Town ==
The community is sparsely inhabited today. Coordinates are 20°48′39″N 156°37′20″W. A 600-acre (2.4 km^{2}) planned community called Olowalu Town was announced in 2005, but as of 2012 had not been constructed. Plans called for constructing 1,500 housing units, a 300,000 square feet (28,000 m^{2}) shopping area, relocating the current highway and installing related infrastructure. On August 3 the Maui County Council voted 7–1 to incorporate Olowalu (previously designated "Agricultural") within the "urban growth boundary" of the Maui Island Plan.

The development is controversial because it is adjacent to one of Hawaii's healthiest and most unusual coral reef systems. The sheltered reef has large coral heads that are estimated to be hundreds of years old, as well as a rare manta ray cleaning station and Blacktip reef shark nursery.

== Gallery ==
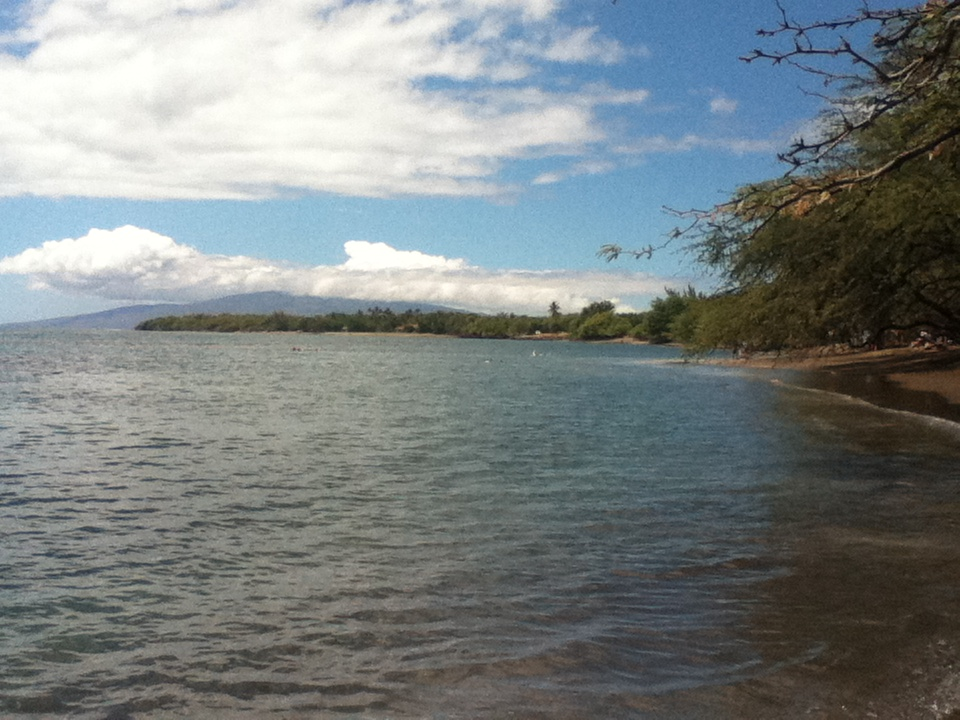
Olowalu beach looking north

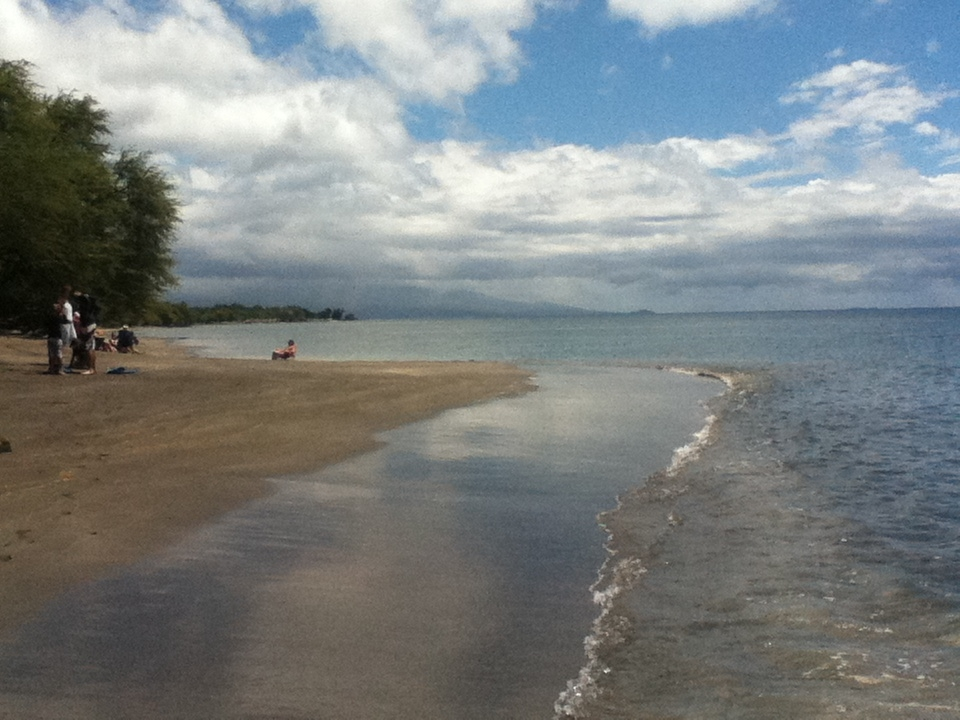
Olowalu beach looking south

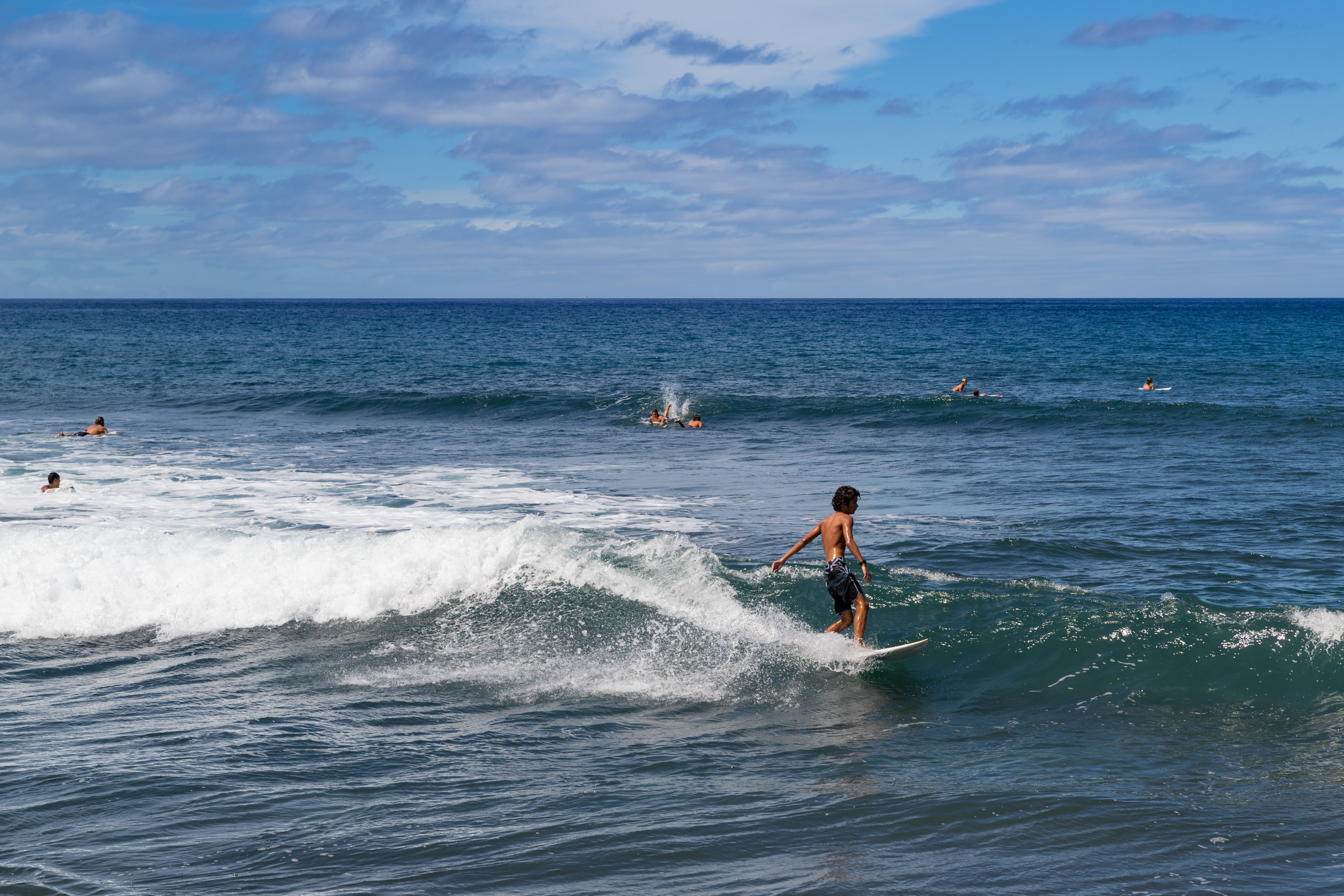
Olowalu beach, West Maui surf spot
