= Olowalu Massacre =

Historical event

- Location: Maui
- Date: 1790
- Attack type: Massacre
- Weapon: Naval artillery
- Deaths: ~100 killed
- Perpetrator: Simon Metcalfe

The Olowalu Massacre was a massacre that took place in Maui in 1790. In 1789, American Captain Simon Metcalfe set out on a maritime fur trading mission with two ships: the large Eleanora, and the tender Fair American, a schooner under command of his son Thomas Humphrey Metcalfe. The Fair American was captured by the Spanish during the Nootka Crisis and taken to Mexico, but quickly released. The Metcalfes had earlier agreed to rendezvous in the Hawaiian Islands at Kealakekua Bay.

The Eleanora had arrived by January 1790, and met chief Kameʻeiamoku who boarded the ship to welcome them. An unknown action by the chief offended Simon Metcalfe, who had him flogged, which would have severe consequences later. The Eleanora then sailed north to the island of Maui to trade and resupply. One night a small boat was stolen and the night watchman was killed. Captain Metcalfe fired his cannons into the village, and captured a few Hawaiians who told him the boat was taken by people from the village of Olowalu.

He sailed to Olowalu but found that boat had been broken up for its nails. Nails were treasured in ancient Hawaii, which lacked metal smelting technology. Metcalfe invited the villagers to meet the ship, indicating he wanted to trade with them. However, he had all the cannons loaded and ready on the side where he directed the canoes to approach. They opened fire, killing about one hundred Hawaiians, and wounded many others.

About five or six weeks later the Fair American arrived at the Island of Hawaiʻi where Kameʻeiamoku was waiting at Kaʻūpūlehu. The schooner's crew of five were easily overwhelmed and four were killed, including Thomas Metcalfe. The lone survivor was Isaac Davis. King Kamehameha I found out about the incident when another sailor, John Young, was captured by Kamehameha's men when he came ashore from the Eleanora to inquire about the Fair American. Kamehameha decided to spare the lives of Davis and Young, who became valued military advisors during his subsequent battles and negotiations with later visitors.

The muskets of the Fair American were salvaged and the schooner refloated. Simon Metcalfe eventually left the island without realizing that he had indirectly caused his own son's death.
