= Simon Metcalfe =

British American surveyor and fur trader (1741–1794)

- Born: April 23, 1741; London, England
- Died: 1794 (aged 52–53); Haida Gwaii
- Occupation: Maritime fur trader
- Spouse: Catherine Humphrey
- Parent(s): George and Anne Metcalfe

Signature
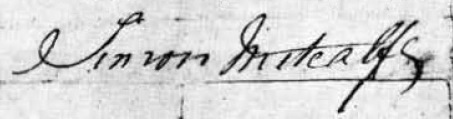

Simon Metcalfe (also spelled Metcalf) (April 23, 1741 – 1794) was a British-born American surveyor and one of the first American maritime fur traders to visit the Pacific Northwest coast.

As early visitors to the Hawaiian Islands in 1789, Metcalfe and his son Thomas Humphrey Metcalfe unwittingly provided Western military weapons and advisors for Kamehameha I, when two of their men and a ship and its armaments were captured. These helped the chief win strategic battles and unify the Hawaiian Islands. The son Thomas and most of his crew were killed about 1789-1790 in an attack by Hawaiian warriors, which the father never learned about.

Simon Metcalfe later returned to the Pacific Northwest. He and all but one of his crew were killed in 1794 in an attack by Haida warriors who were allowed on the ship for trading. This was in what were then known as the Queen Charlotte Islands, now known as Haida Gwaii in present-day British Columbia, Canada.

== Life ==
Simon Metcalfe was born in London, England, April 23, 1741. He was the son of George and Anne Metcalfe of Askrigg, Yorkshire. Due to a recent inheritance, they had moved to Shadwell, London, at the time of Simon's birth. Simon was baptized at 9 days old on May 1, 1741, at St. Pauls, Shadwell. In his early life he trained for a career at sea with the East India Company. He was married in Bolton-on-Swale, Yorkshire, on May 12, 1763, to Catherine Humphrey, daughter of Thomas and Elizabeth Humphrey of that town. Metcalfe said at that time that his address was Dowgate Street, London and that he was a merchant. His brother Bernard Metcalfe was his witness.

He and Catherine Humphrey had at least nine children. About 1765, the family: Simon, Catherine and baby Elizabeth emigrated to the Province of New York, leaving son George in Yorkshire with Simon's brother Bernard, so that the boy could be educated. The Metcalfe family first settled in New York City, a major port. Metcalfe found employment as a surveyor and worked on the survey of the Fort Stanwix Treaty line in about 1769 in the western part of the province. He was promoted to Deputy Surveyor in the Province of New York by 1770.

In 1771, Governor Dunmore of New York granted 30,000 acres (120 km^{2}) of land to Simon Metcalfe and his wife. This land was called Prattsburgh and is now part of Swanton and Highgate in Vermont. With his family settled on this land, Metcalfe established a fur trading post at the mouth of the Missisquoi River.

During the American Revolutionary War, Metcalfe supported the American cause. He was taken prisoner by the British and held in Montreal. As his wife accompanied him, three of his children were born in Montreal around 1777, 1779 and 1781. In early August 1781 their son George arrived with the fleet from England to join the family in Montreal, shortly before Simon and Thomas escaped. In 1783, after the Revolutionary War, the British released Catherine Metcalfe and 8 children as prisoners from Canada. Metcalfe's property located on Lake Champlain was destroyed during the war. After the war was over, Metcalfe moved with his family to Albany, the capital of the new state of New York.

== Maritime fur trade ==
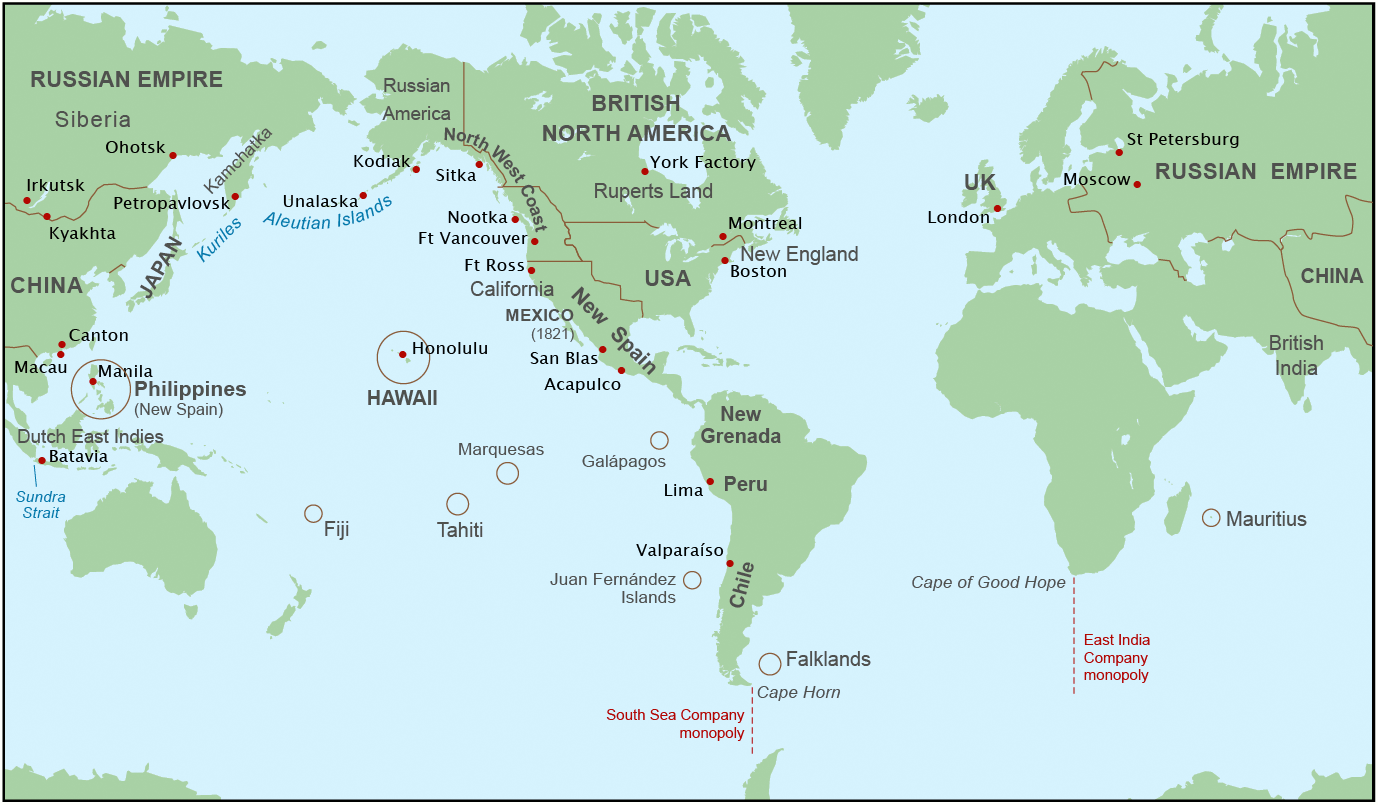
Maritime Fur Trade era, circa 1790 to 1840

In the 1780s, Metcalfe took a consignment of seal furs from the Falkland Islands, which were being stored in New York City for trading. In 1787 he acquired the brig Eleanora (sometimes spelled Eleanor). In September 1787 he set sail for China on the Eleanora with a cargo of furs for trading. He continued as a maritime fur trader for the next seven years. He probably did not return to New York after leaving in 1787.

Metcalfe might have been the first American to sail to the Pacific Northwest coast to pursue fur trading. In command of the Eleanora, he may have been on the Northwest Coast in 1787 or 1788, perhaps before the arrival of American captains Robert Gray and John Kendrick in August and September 1788.

In 1789, both Simon Metcalfe and his son Thomas Humphrey Metcalfe were caught up in the Nootka Crisis at Nootka Sound, near present-day Vancouver Island. Major European powers were competing with the new United States and each other to establish control over trading in this area. Although the events at Nootka were mainly directed toward British merchant vessels, the Spanish naval officer Esteban José Martínez seized Thomas Metcalfe's small schooner, the Fair American. Simon Metcalfe approached Nootka Sound and the Eleanora was almost captured as well, but he managed to escape. The Fair American and its crew were taken to the Spanish naval base at San Blas. They were quickly released.

The Metcalfes had planned to spend the winter in the Hawaiian Islands. After being released, Thomas Metcalfe sailed the Fair American to Hawaii, hoping to join his father.

== Olowalu massacre ==
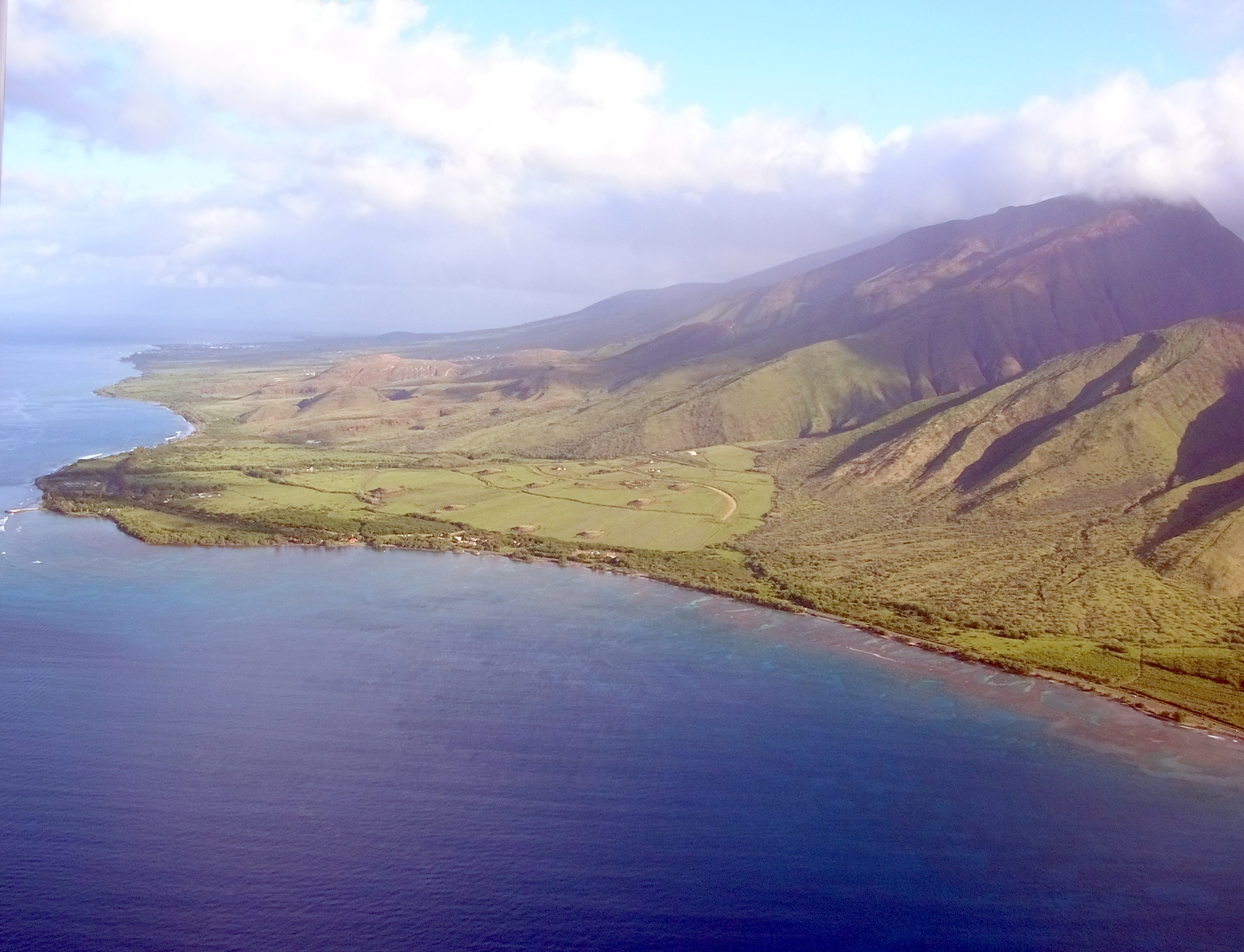
Olowalu, Maui

The Eleanora under Simon Metcalfe arrived in the islands first. In Kohala on the island of Hawaiʻi, Metcalfe was greeted by local chief Kameʻeiamoku. Metcalfe had the chief flogged for some infraction. The captain was said to believe in strong and immediate punishment when his rules were broken. By most accounts he was irascible and harsh. He sailed to the neighboring island of Maui to trade along the coast. Kameʻeiamoku vowed revenge on whatever ship next came his way.

Metcalfe ran into more trouble on the coast of Maui when a boat and sailor went missing. It was discovered that the boat had been stolen and the sailor killed. His retaliation became known as the Olowalu Massacre. He sailed to Olowalu, the village of the suspected thieves. Feigning peaceful intent, he invited the villagers to the Eleanora for trade. Many canoes gathered at the ship. Metcalfe directed them to come to one side, where he had loaded his cannon with ball and shot. He ordered a broadside fired at point-blank range, which blasted the vessels to pieces. About 100 Native Hawaiians were killed and several hundred wounded. Because Hawaiians considered Olowalu a pu'u honua, or place of refuge, this attack had profound and long-lasting consequences, ultimately undermining the site's cultural stability. After the massacre, Metcalfe weighed anchor and returned to the island of Hawai'i. At Kealakekua Bay he began what seemed to be friendly trade for provisions.

== Capture of the Fair American ==
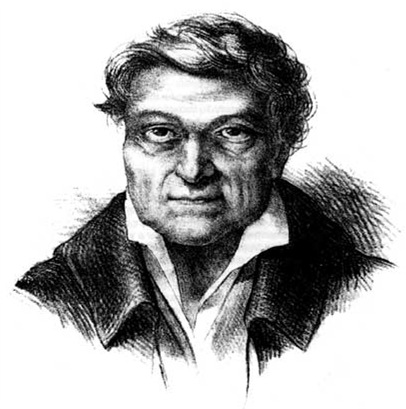
John Young, Simon Metcalfe's boatswain, became military adviser to King Kamehameha

Meanwhile, his son Thomas Humphrey Metcalfe, then 19 years old, arrived near Kawaihae Bay, in the Fair American. By coincidence the Fair American was the next ship to visit the territory of chief Kameʻeiamoku, who was eager for revenge. The schooner was manned by only four sailors plus its relatively inexperienced captain. The Hawaiians easily captured it, and killed Thomas Metcalfe and most of his small crew. The only survivor was Isaac Davis, who was badly injured but spared by chief Kameʻeiamoku. The chief appropriated the ship, its guns, ammunition, and other valuable goods, as well as Davis. At the time the Hawaiians did not realize that the late captain of the Fair American was the son of Simon Metcalfe, whose Eleanora was anchored at Kealakekua Bay, about 30 miles (48 km) away. The chief eventually gave Fair American and Davis to King Kamehameha I.

When Kamehameha learned about the capture of the Fair American, he prohibited further contact between the natives and the Eleanora. Simon Metcalfe sent the boatswain John Young ashore to investigate. Young was captured by the Hawaiians, and Metcalfe was puzzled by the sudden silence. He waited two days for Young to return, firing guns in hope that the sound would guide Young back. Finally, sensing danger or becoming frustrated, Metcalfe left and set sail for China, not knowing that his son had been killed nearby. He never learned about the attack on the Fair American or that his son had been killed.

These events mark a turning point in Hawaiian history. The two men, Englishman John Young and Welshman Isaac Davis, were put to use by Kamehameha, who drew on their knowledge and the armament from the Fair American for his military ventures. He eventually conquered and unified the Hawaiian Islands under his rule. Young and Davis became respected translators and military advisors for Kamehameha. Their skill in gunnery, as well as the cannon from the Fair American, helped Kamehameha win many battles. He won the Battle of Kepaniwai later in 1790, which defeated the forces of Maui. The two men married members of the royal family, raised their families in Hawaii, and received valuable lands.

== Death ==
Simon Metcalfe continued to trade around the Pacific Ocean and Indian Ocean for another 4 years. He was in Macau in 1791. In 1792 he purchased a small French brig at Port Louis, Isle of France (now known as Mauritius), to serve as a tender to Eleanora. He named this brig Ino and appointed his younger son Robert to command her. When the Eleanora sank in the Indian Ocean in September 1792, Metcalfe took command of the Ino.

In 1794, Metcalfe visited Houston Stewart Channel, at the southern end of the Haida Gwaii, and anchored in Coyah's Sound, in the area now known as British Columbia. He began friendly trading with the local Haida natives under Chief Koyah. Metcalfe let a great number come aboard the Ino. The Haida took advantage of their superiority in numbers and attacked. Within a few minutes, the natives had killed nearly every man on board, including Simon Metcalfe, save one who fled into the rigging. The natives ordered the man to come down, and kept him as a slave for about a year.

Eventually that man was ransomed to a visiting European ship, whose captain dropped him off in Hawaii. There he told the story to John Young, who passed it on to other captains who visited the northwest Pacific islands.
