= Resolution (1793 ship) =

18th-century American schooner

History

United States
- Name: Resolution
- Owner: Josiah Roberts
- Laid down: 1792
- Launched: February 8, 1793
- Out of service: 1794
- Captured: 1794, Haida Gwaii
- Fate: Destroyed, 1794, Haida Gwaii

General characteristics
- Tons burthen: 90 (bm)
- Propulsion: Sail
- Complement: 12

Resolution was a small American schooner built in the Marquesas Islands in 1793 as a tender for the maritime fur trade ship Jefferson. Later in 1793 she became the fourth European vessel to enter the Columbia River, cruising between the river and Clayoquot Sound on Vancouver Island.

In March 1794, Resolution separated from Jefferson. After several brief voyages she was captured and destroyed by the Haida chief Cumshewa and his followers in 1794. All but one of the crew were killed. The lone survivor was later rescued by the Boston ship Despatch.

== Construction ==
The wooden frame for Resolution's hull was prefabricated in Boston in 1790 and transported to the Pacific Ocean aboard the fur trading vessel Jefferson in a voyage commencing in November 1791. After a year at sea, Jefferson anchored in Resolution Bay on Santa Christina Island in the Marquesas shortly before Christmas in 1792. (Note: The Bay was originally named by Captain James Cook, who anchored there in 1773 during his second voyage to the Pacific. The name reflects that of HMS Resolution, Cook's flagship on that voyage.) Her captain Josiah Roberts ordered the frame to be unloaded and built into a small schooner that he named Resolution in honour of the bay in which it was assembled.

The newly built Resolution was launched on February 8, 1793. Sea trials showed that she sailed well and fast, and would be capable of making the voyage from the Marquesas to the North American mainland.

== Career ==
Roberts selected 12 men from Jefferson to be her crew and appointed one, a Mr. Burling, as captain. Her first mate was Solomon Kendrick, who had previously visited the Pacific Northwest as part of his father John Kendrick's 1788 expedition to Nootka Sound.

The Resolution sailed with the Jefferson as her tender. On May 19, 1793, the vessels reached the Pacific Northwest Coast and entered the mouth of the Columbia River. They cruised between the Columbia and Clayoquot Sound until March 1794, when they separated to collect furs, intending to join company later. The Jefferson never saw the Resolution again. Its fate was later learned from several sources, including logs from the merchant ships Ruby and Despatch. The Resolution was captured by the Haida chief Cumshewa and his people in 1794. All but one of the crew were killed, including Captain Burling and Solomon Kendrick. The lone survivor was later rescued by the Boston ship Despatch. In 1799 the merchant ship Eliza under Burling's brother Captain Samuel Burling visited the Kaigani Haida of Dall Island at the trading site known as "Kaigani". Chief Altatsee told Captain Burling that the Cumshewa Haida had killed his brother and Solomon Kendrick.

== See also ==
- John Kendrick Jr.
- Tonquin, another American merchant ship which met a similar fate in 1811
- List of ships in British Columbia
