= Ninstints =

Haida village site in Haida Gwaii, British Columbia, Canada

S'G̱ang Gwaay Llnagaay
- Ninstints
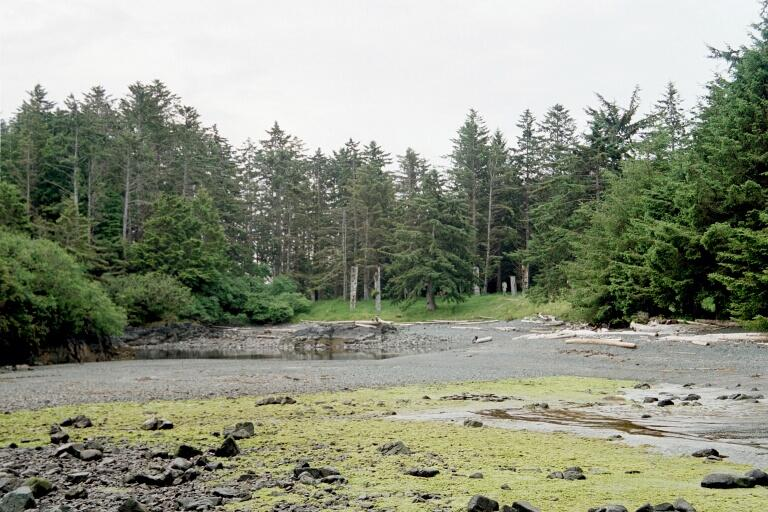
- Haida village of S'G̱ang Gwaay Llanagaay

- Location within British Columbia
- Interactive map of S'G̱ang Gwaay Llnagaay
- 52.098889°N 131.2175°W
- Location: Haida Gwaii, North Coast of British Columbia, Canada

National Historic Site of Canada
- Official name: Nan Sdins National Historic Site
- Designated: 1981-01-15

UNESCO World Heritage Site
- Official name: SG̱ang Gwaay
- Type: Cultural
- Criteria: iii
- Designated: 1981 (5th session)
- Reference no.: 157
- Region: Europe and North America

SG̱ang Gwaay Llnagaay ("Red Cod Island"), commonly known by its English name Ninstints, is a village site of the Haida people and part of the Gwaii Haanas National Park Reserve and Haida Heritage Site on Haida Gwaii on the North Coast of British Columbia, Canada.

The village site is a UNESCO World Heritage Site, as well as Canadian National Historic Site and National Marine Conservation site.

== Name ==
The name of the village site, SG̱ang Gwaay Llnagaay, is the Haida name for Anthony Island, where the village is located and means "Red Cod Island." During the late 18th and early 19th centuries the village was referred to as Koyahs or Coyahs, also rendered Quee-ah, after the chief at the time, Koyah. The name "Ninstints," also spelled "Nan Sdins," was the name of the most powerful of the village's chiefs in the mid-19th century and came to be used as the village's name as a result of the practice of ship captains referring to villages by the name of the headman or chief at the location.

== Village site ==
The village was one of the southernmost of Haida villages, located in a sheltered bay on the east side of the island, just west of and facing Kunghit Island, the southernmost large island in the archipelago. It is small but also the most secluded and protected major Haida settlement because of its location on a sheltered rocky bay. SG̱ang Gwaay llnagaay is the earliest recorded village in the southern archipelago.

SG̱ang Gwaay Llnagaay today features the largest collection of Haida totem poles in their original locations, all of which are celebrated as great works of art, though Haida are allowing them to succumb to the natural decay of the lush temperate rainforest climate. Images of the ruins of SG̱ang Gwaay Llnagaay are emblematic of Haida culture and of Haida Gwaii and are featured in tourism promotions for the islands and the province at large. The site is extremely remote, and access is only by sea or air from towns in the northern part of the islands. To protect the valuable Haida Heritage Sites, Haida operate a Watchmen program, stationing Haida at traditional village sites throughout Haida Gwaii including within Gwaii Haanas National Park Reserve and Haida Heritage Site. The Watchmen ensure that visitors are acting in an appropriate manner and maintain a presence on their traditional territories.

== History ==
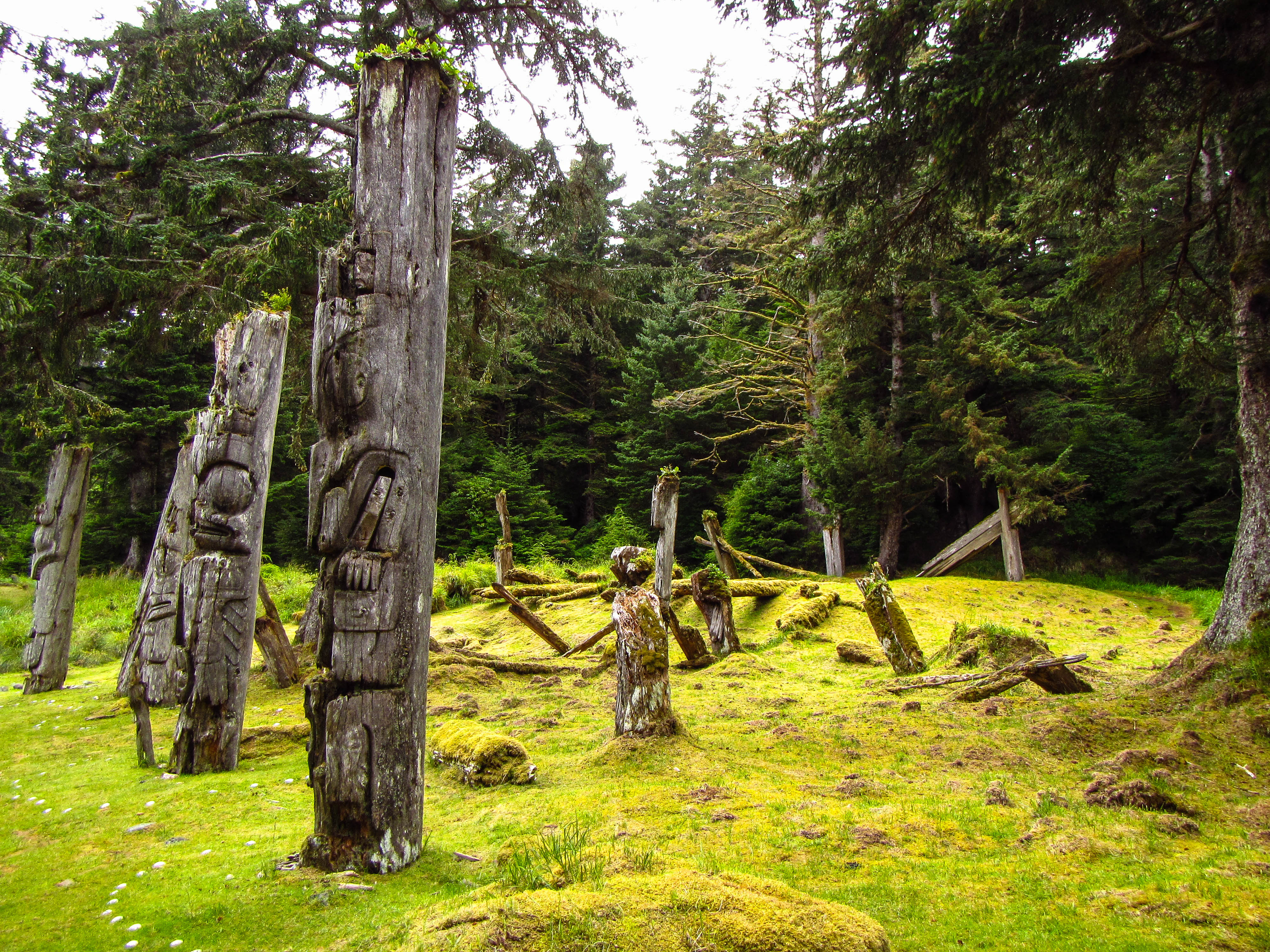
Totem poles of S'G̱ang Gwaay Llanagaay

Archaeological evidence shows that Haida Gwaii has been inhabited for at least 10,000 years, with territories of the Haida extending North into Southern Alaska. The village site dates back to at least 360 CE.

The people of SG̱ang Gwaay llnagaay are sometimes referred to as the Kunghit Haida. The Kunghit Haida occupied the southern portion of the archipelago of Haida Gwaii, with territory stretching from Lyell Island to the farthest southern tip of the archipelago. They had approximately two dozen permanent villages, as well as other smaller seasonal settlements located near major resource areas. Early records of Haida testimony recorded by John R. Swanton place the number of long houses at twenty.

Larger Kunghit Haida villages had as many as seventeen or more longhouses, with village populations ranging from less than two hundred to more than five hundred. The last chief to be born in Ninstints, whose English name is Thomas Price, was a noted and highly artistic carver of Haida art, notably in argillite.

=== Post-contact era ===
SG̱ang Gwaay Llnagaay was the location of several notable episodes in the early history of European contact and trade with the Haida. At the outset of the maritime fur trade, the village was visited in 1787 by George Dixon, who noted the Haidas who met them at sea were eager to trade with sea otter fur. This marked the initially amicable trade relations, where SG̱ang Gwaay Llanagaay was visited once again in 1788 by Charles Duncan, and twice in 1789 – first by Robert Gray then by his partner John Kendrick later that year, at which point the trade relationship turned hostile.

In the decades which followed, the trade relationship improved between the Haida and European traders in the area. Because of this, and the diseases that ravaged the villages, many moved to economic hubs such as Masset, Skidegate, and as far as Victoria to take advantage of this growing relationship.

For those who remained at SGang Gwaay Llanagaay, their population was greatly reduced by the 1862 Pacific Northwest smallpox epidemic. In the succeeding years, the population continued to decline due to other introduced diseases. By 1875 the site was used primarily as a camp, and by 1878 all the remaining people of SGang Gwaay Llanagaay had all moved to Skidegate.

== See also ==
- List of Haida villages
