= Koyah =

Koyah, also Xo'ya, Coya, Coyour, Kower, Kouyer (Haida: Xhuuyaa, lit. 'Raven'; fl. 1787–1795), was the chief of Ninstints or Skungwai, the main village of the Kunghit-Haida during the era of the Maritime Fur Trade in Haida Gwaii off the North Coast of British Columbia, Canada. Koyah was involved in more conflicts with ship captains than any other chief of his period and figures prominently in histories of the fur trade and coastal exploration.

At first Koyah's encounters with maritime fur traders went smoothly. There was successful trading with George Dixon in 1787, Charles Duncan in 1788, and Robert Gray in 1789. Then Koyah had two clashes with John Kendrick in 1789 and 1791. The second of these turned violent and many natives were killed.

In 1793, Koyah helped Haida Chief Cumshewa capture the American brig Resolution. In 1794, Koyah's Haida captured Simon Metcalfe's brig Ino, resulting in the murder of all but one of the crew. In 1795 Koyah participated in an attack upon John Boit's ship Union.

Despite the violence that marked Koyah's encounters with fur traders, his territory remained a popular port of call due to the quantity and quality of furs available.

== See also ==
- Chief Cuneah
