= Cumshewa =

18th-century leader of the Haida people

Cumshewa, also Go'mshewah, Cummashawa, Cummashawaas, Cumchewas, and Gumshewa, was an important hereditary leader of the Haida people of Haida Gwaii on the North Coast of what is now British Columbia, Canada. His name is believed to be of either Kwak'wala or Heiltsuk (Bella Bella) origin, meaning "rich at the mouth of the river". He is mentioned by Captain George Dixon, who traded with him in 1787. In 1794, Cumshewa and his warriors massacred the crew of the American vessel Resolution.

== Legacy ==
Cumshewa is commemorated on modern maps of the archipelago by several places named for him, including Cumshewa Inlet, Cumshewa Mountain, Cumshewa Head (a point), Cumshewa Island, the Cumshewa Rocks, and the modern First Nations locality of Cumshewa (which is on the inlet of that name).
