= North West America =

British merchant ship

History

Great Britain
- Name: North West America
- Launched: 1788
- Captured: By Spanish Navy, 1789

Spain
- Name: Santa Gertrudis la Magna and, later, Santa Saturnina
- Acquired: 1789

General characteristics
- Tons burthen: About 30–50 tons (bm)
- Length: 33 ft (10 m)
- Propulsion: Sails and 8 oars
- Sail plan: Schooner

North West America was a British merchant ship that sailed on maritime fur trading ventures in the late 1780s. It was the first non-indigenous vessel built in the Pacific Northwest. In 1789 it was captured at Nootka Sound by Esteban José Martínez of Spain during the Nootka Crisis, after which it became part of the Spanish Navy and was renamed Santa Gertrudis la Magna and later Santa Saturnina.

The vessel also played an important role in both British and Spanish exploration of the Pacific Northwest, especially the Strait of Juan de Fuca, San Juan Islands, and the Strait of Georgia. Under the Spanish commander José María Narváez Santa Saturnina was the first European vessel to find and explore the Strait of Georgia and the area that is the city of Vancouver today.

The vessel was a schooner, or goleta in Spanish. Its exact size is not known. John Meares wrote that North West America was about 40 to 50 tons (bm). Robert Haswell of Columbia Rediviva, who watched the vessel launched, estimated it at about 30 tons.

The vessel may have been enlarged when it was renamed Santa Saturnina, at which point it acquired the nickname La Orcasitas. The Santa Saturnina was about 33 feet (10 m) long on the keel, of shallow draft, and had eight oars.

== British merchant vessel North West America ==
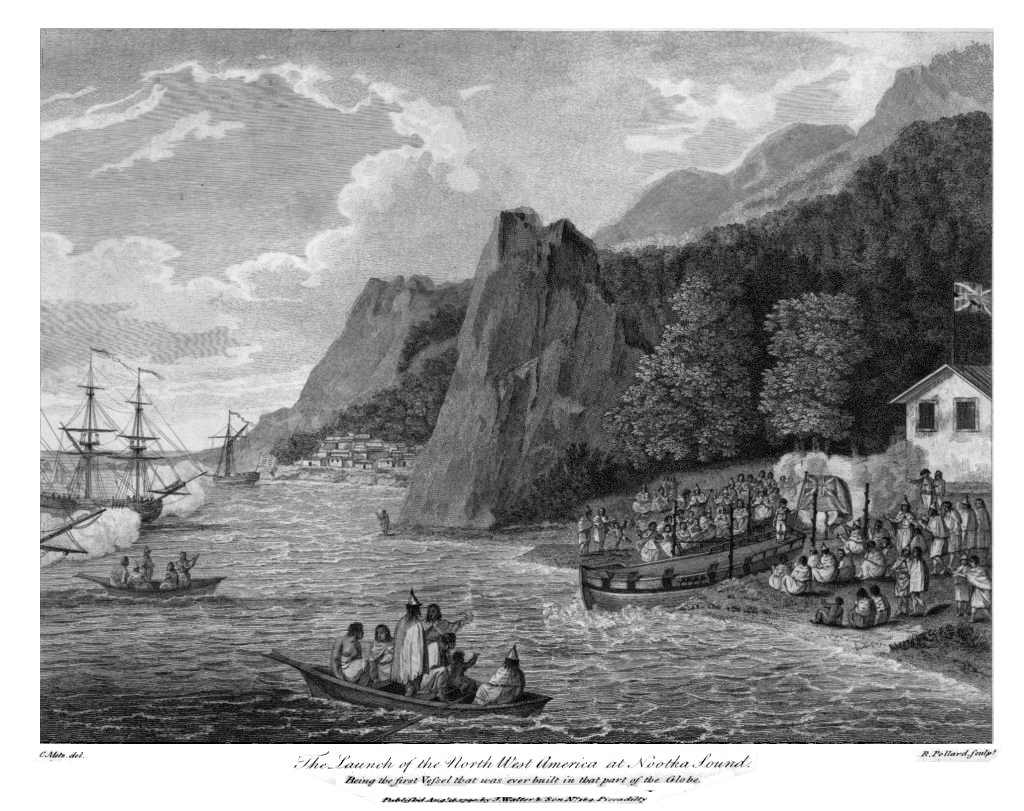
The launch of the North-West America at Nootka Sound, 1788

North West America was built at Nootka Sound, Vancouver Island, in 1788 from materials brought from Asia aboard Felice Adventurer, captain John Meares, and Iphigenia Nubiana, captain William Douglas. These ships had sailed from Macau in January 1788. Meares, who had cruised the Northwest Coast for furs in 1786 and 1787, intended to establish a permanent fur trading post at Nootka Sound. For that purpose he brought materials for building the vessel as well as a house. To assist with construction 50 Chinese men were hired and sailed with the expedition. They became the first Chinese known to have visited the Pacific Northwest and Hawaii.

Meares had chosen not to pay for licenses from the East India Company and South Sea Company, which were legally required of British merchants working in East Asia and the Pacific Ocean. Instead he tried to conceal the illegal activity by using the flag of Portugal and sailing under the titular Portuguese command of Francisco José Viana, who pretended to be the captain of Iphigenia. After being built and launched, North West America also flew the Portuguese flag.

North West America was launched on 20 September 1788. It was the first non-indigenous vessel built in the Pacific Northwest. Command was given to Robert Funter. Soon after the launch, Meares sailed Felice back to Macau. On 27 October 1788 Iphigenia and North West America were towed out of Nootka Sound by John Kendrick's longboats. They then sailed to the Hawaiian Islands where they spent the winter. They arrived at Maui on 6 December 1788, then sailed to the island of Hawaii and anchored in Kealakekua Bay. Other than Queen Charlotte, under Captain George Dixon, and King George, under Nathaniel Portlock, Iphigenia and North West America were the first European ships to visit Kealakekua Bay since Captain James Cook was killed there in 1779. On 10 December the future king of the Hawaiian Kingdom, Kamehameha I visited the two vessels.

Over the winter of 1788–1789 Douglas and Funter sailed Iphigenia and North West America from island to island. In March, 1789, Douglas was ready to sail back to the Pacific Northwest coast. On 17 March 1789 Douglas and Funter left the Hawaiian Islands for Nootka Sound, where they hoped to meet Meares in another ship. Douglas arrived at Nootka Sound on 20 April 1789 and anchored near the Nuu-chah-nulth village of Yuquot. Funter took North West America on a fur trading cruise along the Pacific Northwest Coast before sailing to Nootka Sound, arriving there on 24 April 1789. North West America was then hauled up on the beach for repairs. Iphigenia was also in need of repairs.

Meanwhile, in Macau Meares and his business partners had decided to merge their company with their former rival, the King George's Sound Company, owned by the Richard Cadman Etches and his brothers in London. The merged company was called by various names such as "The Associated Merchants of London and India", "The United Company of British Merchants Trading to the North West Coast of America", "The South Sea Company of London", or simply "the united Company".

Because the Etches brothers had proper licenses with the East India Company and South Sea Company, the several company ships that sailed to Nootka Sound in 1789 flew the British flag. The company's 1789 expedition and all its ships were put under the command of James Colnett, including Iphigenia and North West America. Until they learned about the new situation, Douglas and Funter continued to fly Portuguese flags and pretended to be under the command of the Portuguese captain Viana.

== Nootka Incident ==
Before Colnett's ships arrived North West America was ready for sea again. Funter set out on a trading voyage to the north, departing Nootka Sound on 28 April 1789. Two days later Robert Gray left with Lady Washington. The only ships left in Nootka Sound were Douglas's Iphigenia and John Kendrick's Columbia Rediviva when on 6 May 1789 the Spanish warship Princesa, under Esteban José Martínez, entered the harbor to build an outpost and assert Spanish sovereignty. On May 12 the 16–gun San Carlos, under Gonzalo López de Haro arrived, reinforcing Martínez, who then arrested Captain Douglas and seized Iphigenia, the first event in what soon became an international incident called the Nootka Crisis.

After lengthy negotiation between Martínez and Douglas, Martínez released Douglas and allowed him to depart with Iphigenia. Douglas left Nootka Sound on 1 June 1789. He hoped to encounter Funter returning on North West America but the vessels missed each other. On June 8 Funter sailed North West America into Nootka Sound. In a series of events similar to what had happened to Douglas and Iphigenia, Funter and his crew were soon arrested and North West America seized. According to Joseph Ingraham, second mate of Columbia, Martínez had paid to repair and provision Iphigenia and had an agreement with Douglas that North West America would be held as security for these costs, not because of any threat to Spanish sovereignty.

Due to the way the events of the Nootka Crisis played out, and that Douglas was never able to repay Martínez, North West America was never returned to the British. It became a Spanish ship, renamed Santa Gertrudis la Magna and, later, Santa Saturnina.

== Spanish naval vessel Santa Gertrudis la Magna ==
On 21 June 1789, Martínez dispatched José María Narváez in the captured North West America, renamed Santa Gertrudis la Magna, to explore inlets to the south of Nootka Sound. By early July Narváez returned to Nootka, having sailed about 65 miles (105 km) into the Strait of Juan de Fuca, demonstrating that it was a very large inlet. He also visited the Makah village at Neah Bay, the first Spaniard to do so. After hearing Narváez's report, Martínez felt that the Strait of Juan de Fuca was the entrance of the legendary Northwest Passage and of extreme strategic importance. Therefore, he placed Gonzalo López de Haro and Narváez in command of San Carlos and the captured Princess Royal, renamed Princesa Real, and sent them to the Spanish naval base at San Blas with news about the strait. In October, Martínez completely evacuated Nootka Sound and returned to San Blas himself, with his prisoners and captured ships.

Spanish records about Santa Gertrudis la Magna, often simply called Santa Gertrudis, can be confusing and difficult to interpret, in part because a Spanish warship called Santa Gertrudis was redeployed from Callao, Peru, to the San Blas Naval Department in 1790. Over the next few years both vessels were in use at Nootka Sound and along the coast Northwest Coast. Sometime before early 1791 Santa Gertrudis la Magna, formerly North West America, was renamed Santa Saturnina.

== Spanish naval vessel Santa Saturnina ==
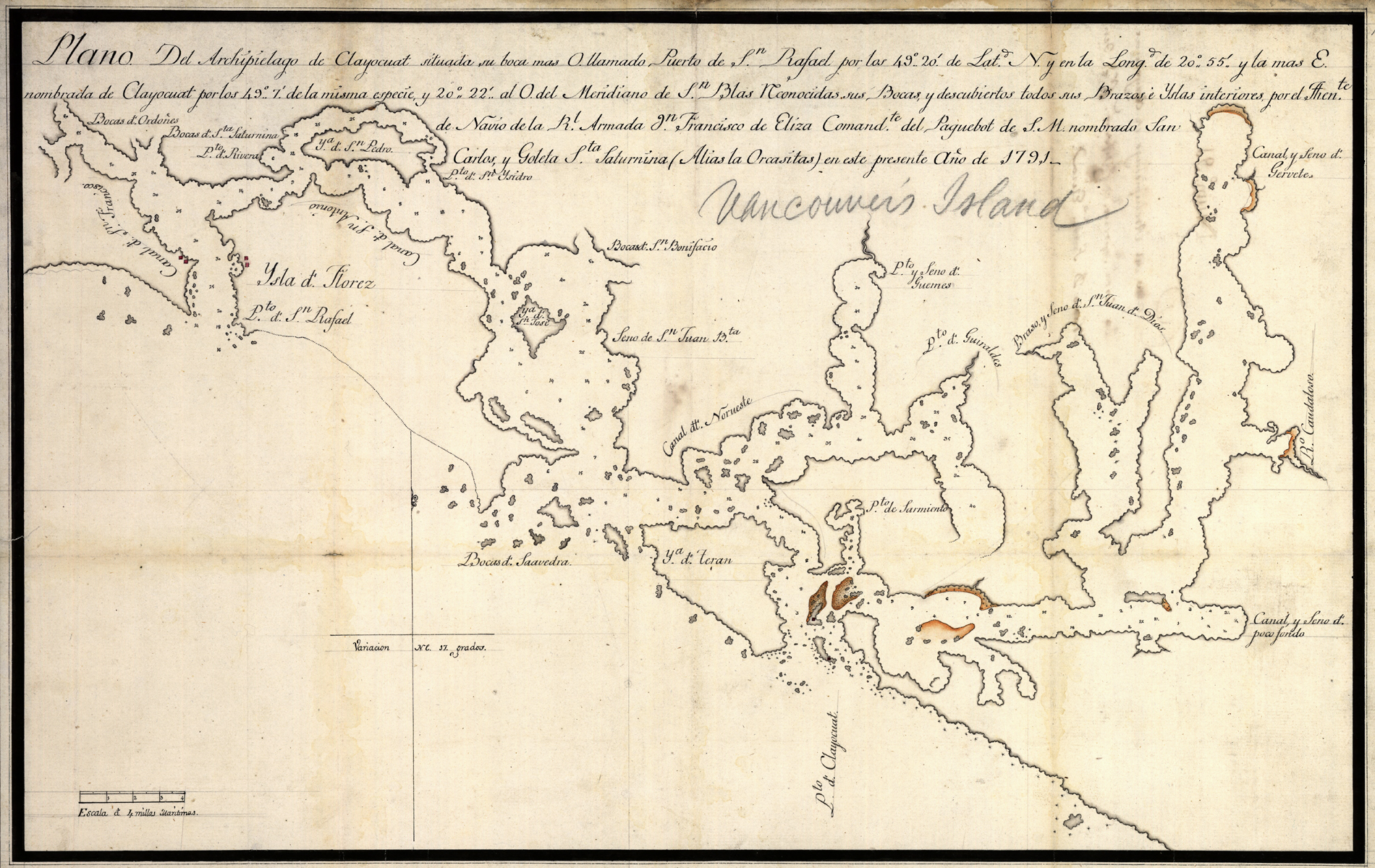
Map of Clayoquot Sound made during the 1791 exploration voyage under Francisco de Eliza, probably drawn by Narváez or Carrasco.

On 4 May 1791 an exploring expedition under Francisco de Eliza, commanding San Carlos, set out from Nootka Sound, with Santa Saturnina under the command of José María Narváez (ranked segundo piloto havilitado (qualified second pilot—piloto in Spanish being equivalent to master in English). Juan Pantoja y Arriaga (primer piloto), José Antonio Verdia (segundo piloto), and Juan Carrasco (pilotín, "pilot's mate"), were also involved. Juan Francisco de la Bodega y Quadra, commandant of the Naval Department of San Blas, had instructed Eliza to explore Bucareli Bay in Alaska and the Strait of Juan de Fuca, among other places. Accordingly, the expedition sailed north from Nootka Sound, but Santa Saturnina was greatly impeded by contrary winds, so after three days Eliza decided to turn south toward Clayoquot Sound, and not explore Bucareli Bay.

Narváez took Santa Saturnina, with Carrasco and Verdía, to Clayoquot Sound and Barkley Sound and spent about two weeks exploring and mapping. On two occasions in Barkley Sound Santa Saturnina was attacked by groups of about 200 Nuu-chah-nulth. Narváez used cannon fire to keep them away. According to Narváez, the natives were surprised to see the schooner and said they had never seen a Western vessel inside Barkley Sound. From Barkley Sound Narváez took Santa Saturnina to rendezvous with Eliza at Esquimalt Harbour, called Cordova by the Spanish, arriving there on 11 June 1791.

Eliza had Juan Pantoja y Arriaga, assisted by Narváez, Carrasco, and Verdía, take Santa Saturnina and a longboat to explore Haro Strait. The longboat was 28 feet (8.5 m) in length and had thirteen oars. Pantoja entered the strait on June 14. He sailed along the shores of San Juan Island, Pender Island, and Saturna Island, then entered the open waters of the Strait of Georgia, which was named Canal de Nuestra Señora del Rosario. He continued east, reaching Rosario Strait and Lummi Island, then returned the Esquimalt by the same route.

Eliza moved his base of operations from Esquimalt to Puerto de Quadra (present-day Port Discovery), on the southern side of the Strait of Juan de Fuca. On 1 July Narváez took Santa Saturnina and the longboat to explore Rosario Strait, with Carrasco as piloto. Narváez sailed through the strait, which he called Canal de Fidalgo. He surveyed Guemes Island (Islas de Guemes), Cypress Island (San Vincente), and Lummi Island (Pacheco), explored Padilla Bay (Seno Padillo) and Bellingham Bay (Seno Gaston), and anchored in Chuckanut Bay (Puerto Socorro), before heading north into the Strait of Georgia. He anchored in Birch Bay (Puerto del Garzon) and Drayton Harbor (Punta de San José), and sailed west across Boundary Bay to round Point Roberts.

From there Narváez took Santa Saturnina north far into the Strait of Georgia, the first Europeans to do so. He made a rough survey of the coast, including Point Roberts, Point Grey (today part of the city of Vancouver), Burrard Inlet, Texada Island, Hornby Island, Denman Island, Nanaimo Harbour, Valdes Island, Porlier Pass, and Galiano Island. He returned to Port Discovery by a route not exactly known, arriving in late July. When Santa Saturnina had been in the vicinity of Point Grey Narváez noted large amounts of fresh water and correctly deduced the presence of a large river nearby—the Fraser River. He also noted many whales in the Strait of Georgia, which suggested to Eliza that there must be another connection to the open ocean and that Nootka Sound was on an island rather than the mainland, as it is.

Because many of his sailors were sick, Eliza decided to return to Nootka Sound. He transferred Narváez to his command ship San Carlos and gave command of Santa Saturnina to Juan Carrasco. The two vessels sailed out of the Strait of Juan de Fuca together, finding and naming Port Angeles Harbor on the way. On 7 August they arrived at Neah Bay. From there San Carlos sailed north and reached Nootka Sound on 9 November. Carrasco was unable to beat upwind to Nootka so instead sailed Santa Saturnina south to Monterey and then San Blas. At Monterey he found the Malaspina Expedition, under Alejandro Malaspina, who therefore learned about the Strait of Georgia and arranged for two of his officers to explore it more thoroughly in 1792.

== Fate ==
The ultimate fate of Santa Saturnina is not known. It seems to have become part of the small Spanish fleet based at San Blas, mostly tasked with supplying the Spanish missions in California. In 1792 Santa Saturnina, commanded by Juan Carrasco, sailed from San Blas to San Francisco. From there Carrasco sailed to Monterey to meet Bodega y Quadra and give him a Royal Order regarding the imminent negotiations with George Vancouver about resolving the Nootka Crisis. Further details about Santa Saturnina are unknown.

== See also ==
- List of historical ships in British Columbia
- Nootka Convention
