= William Douglas (sea captain) =

William Douglas (died 1791) was a Scottish ship captain and an oceanographer maritime fur trader during the late 18th century. He worked with the British trader and Captain John Meares, commanding the ship Iphigenia Nubiana. He was involved in the Nootka Crisis of 1789, which brought Britain and Spain to the brink of war. A few years later he was captain of the American ship Grace. In 1791 he partnered with Captain John Kendrick in an attempt to open trade with Japan.

== Captain of Iphigenia ==
=== Trading voyages of 1788 ===
==== Preparations ====
Douglas was an officer on Nootka during Meares's first fur trading voyage to the Pacific Northwest coast from 1786 to 1787. In 1788, in Macau, China, Meares formed a partnership of several merchants and captains, and purchased two new vessels, the snows Felice Adventurer and Iphigenia Nubiana—generally called Felice and Iphigenia. Meares took command of Felice. He made Douglas captain of Iphigenia and second in command of the expedition, noting in his later account that Douglas "was well acquainted with the coast of America".

Felice Adventurer was of 230 tons burthen (bm) and Iphigenia Nubiana of 200 tons (bm). Meares described them as having bottoms sheathed with copper. Felice had a crew of 50, Iphigenia 40. In order to avoid the cost of acquiring licenses from the East India Company and South Sea Company—required for British merchant ships trading across the Pacific Ocean—and to evade the high port costs China demanded of foreign ships other than those of Portugal, Meares and his partners had Felice and Iphigenia sail under the Portuguese flag. The ships were registered in Macau under a Portuguese merchant named João Carvalho. They sailed under the titular Portuguese command of Francisco José Viana, who pretended to be the captain of Iphigenia, while Meares pretended to be the supercargo of Felice. This tactic of sailing under false colors was not uncommon at the time and was used by other British maritime fur traders such as Charles William Barkley.

==== Departure ====
Felice and Iphigenia sailed from Macau on 22 January 1788. Meares intended to establish permanent fur trading posts on the Pacific Northwest coast. Felice carried materials for constructing a house and a schooner, both to be built at Nootka Sound. To assist with building and running the posts 50 Chinese men were hired and sailed with the expedition. They became the first Chinese known to have visited the Pacific Northwest and Hawaii. Also sailing with Meares and Douglas were a number of Native Hawaiians and Native Americans, including Tianna (Kaʻiana – also spelled Tyaana & Tyanna), a chief of Kauai, who Meares had brought from Hawaii to Macau, and Wynee (or Winee), a Hawaiian girl who Charles William Barkley had brought to Macau in 1787. The ships also carried two natives of Maui, a boy and a man who Douglas referred to as Tawnee. There was also a Nuu-chah-nulth—a native of Vancouver Island—called Comekela. Kaiana, Wynee, and Comekela were aboard Felice. The others were on Iphigenia. Wynee became ill shortly after the ships left Macau. On 5 February 1788, she died.

Meares, Douglas, and their partners had planned for Meares to sail Felice to Nootka Sound, on Vancouver Island, while Douglas sailed Iphigenia to the Aleutian Islands and down the coast of North America to Nootka Sound, collecting furs along the way. The ships would rendezvous in Nootka Sound or, failing that, Hawaii. While Douglas was exploring the coast from Alaska to Nootka Sound, Meares would explore south along today's Washington and Oregon coasts. By this plan the two ships would be able to explore the whole coast from Spanish California to the Bering Sea. At the time the Pacific Northwest coast was still largely unexplored. Only its general shape and a few small harbors such as Nootka Sound had been charted. The possibility that a Northwest Passage might exist was taken seriously. Meares hoped to find it.

==== Separation ====
While crossing the South China Sea Iphigenia proved to be a "heavy" sailer and much slower than Felice. Iphigenia sprang her foremast and began to leak, and also suffered an outbreak of scurvy. For these reasons the two ships sailed to the Spanish port at Zamboanga in the Philippines, where Iphigenia was repaired. Meares did not want to wait for the repairs to be finished. He transferred Kaiana and the other native Hawaiians to Iphigenia, charging Douglas with taking them to their homeland. Comekela remained on Felice, which sailed from Zamboanga soon after arriving.

Douglas left with the repaired Iphigenia on 22 February 1788. Because of the delay he decided to sail first to the Pacific Northwest coast, instead of Hawaii, in order to arrive in time for the fur trading season. Douglas sailed Iphigenia from the Philippines north through the Celebes Sea and the Philippine Sea, then crossed the Pacific directly to the northwest coast.

==== Nootka Sound ====
Felice reached America first, anchoring in Nootka Sound near the native village of Yuquot on 13 May 1788. Comekela returned to his people. A few days later Meares was visited by the chiefs Maquinna and Callicum. According to Meares, on 25 May 1788 Maquinna sold or granted a tract of land to Meares as a site for the construction of a trading post house. Whether Maquinna actually did this became a point of contention between Britain and Spain, and in 1792 Maquinna denied in an affidavit that he had. This was one of the key issues of the Nootka Crisis. Another issue was what kind of "house", if any, Meares built. By Meares' account it was finished on 28 May 1788 and boasted two floors, an attached blacksmith shop, a surrounding breastwork and a cannon emplacement. Work was begun on a schooner, which was finished, named North West America, and launched in September.

Douglas and Iphigenia had not arrived at Nootka Sound by June and Meares decided to sail south to collect furs, leaving a group of men and officers at Nootka Sound under the command of Robert Funter. Meares left on 11 June 1788 and returned on 26 July. Douglas had still not yet arrived with Iphigenia. In August Meares took Felice on another fur trading cruise, this time to Clayoquot Sound. He returned to Nootka Sound on 24 August. On August 26 Iphigenia was spotted. Captain Douglas anchored in Nootka Sound on the 27th.

==== Northern voyage ====
As planned, Douglas had crossed the North Pacific to the Aleutian Islands. He entered Cook Inlet and Prince William Sound in Alaska, then cruised south, trading for furs along the way. Meares wrote that Douglas's voyage had confirmed that there was a "Great Northern Archipelago"—today's Alexander Archipelago and British Columbia Coast—and that earlier voyages had been exploring offshore islands rather than the mainland.

Between the two of them Douglas and Meares had collected a valuable cargo of hundreds of furs. Meares decided that as soon as the new schooner, North West America, was launched he would sail Felice to Macau, China, with the combined cargo of furs. Douglas and Iphigenia would remain at Nootka Sound until North West America was ready for sea, then the two vessels would sail to Hawaii and spend the winter there. The following spring they would return to the Northwest Coast.

==== Departure ====
On 17 September 1788, before North West America was finished, the American maritime fur trader Robert Gray arrived at Nootka Sound with Lady Washington. The British and American captains were suspicious of each other from the start. North West America was launched on 20 September 1788. Robert Funter was given command of the schooner and a crew was selected from Felice and Iphigenia. The combined cargo of 750 furs was loaded into Felice, which left Nootka Sound on 24 September 1788. In October, Meares stopped at a few places in the Hawaiian Islands, communicating and trading with the Hawaiians but not going ashore. He discovered that the political situation on Kauai might prove dangerous for Kaiana, who was to return with Douglas on Iphigenia. Hoping to warn Douglas and Kaiana, Meares left a letter to Douglas with a Hawaiian of Niihau, who both captains had met before and called Friday (after the character Friday from the novel Robinson Crusoe). Meares left Hawaii on 27 October 1788 and arrived at Macau on 5 December.

North West America was ready for sea a few weeks after Meares had left Nootka Sound. Captain Douglas, in preparing to sail, had all the tools and supplies on shore loaded onto Iphigenia and North West America. He also had his men tear down the "house" that Meares had built, not knowing, or not caring that Meares had promised to give it to the natives. Douglas gave some of the planks to John Kendrick, the American captain of Columbia Rediviva, which had arrived at Nootka Sound shortly after Lady Washington.

Douglas traded some cannons to Kendrick in exchange for additional provisions. Kendrick's longboats towed Douglas's ships out of Nootka Sound. After the British ships left, the local natives who had been very skittish since the Americans arrived, suddenly came in great numbers and soon a friendly trading relationship was established. According to the journals and logs of the Americans, Douglas and his men had treated the local natives very poorly—repeatedly taking food and provisions from them under the threat of force.

=== Wintering in the Hawaiian Islands ===
On 27 October 1788 Iphigenia and North West America, under Douglas and Funter, left Nootka Sound for the Hawaiian Islands, where they spent the winter. The purpose was to avoid the unpleasant winter storms of the Pacific Northwest coast and for "refreshment". They arrived off the Hawaiian island of Maui on December 6. From there they sailed to the island of Hawaii. News of the return of Kaiana spread and many of his friends and relatives came to the ships to visit with him. Douglas anchored the ships in Kealakekua Bay. Other than Queen Charlotte, under Captain George Dixon, and King George, under Nathaniel Portlock, Iphigenia and North West America were the first European ships to visit Kealakekua Bay since James Cook was killed there. Kamehameha I came to Iphigenia on December 10. In 1795 Kamehameha established the Kingdom of Hawaii over most of the islands, but in 1788 was still struggling to gain control over the island of Hawaii. Kamehameha gave Douglas a large fan and two full-length cloaks made from the feathers of mamo and ʻŌʻō birds (both now extinct). Later, Douglas gave these cloaks to Captain Robert Gray, who in turn gave them to Esteban José Martínez.

On December 19 Douglas, wanting to find an anchorage more protected from squally weather, ordered Iphigenia's anchor raised only to discover that the line had been cut. Kamehameha and his chiefs, who were on board, immediately left and paddled quickly to the shore, making it clear they were to blame for the sabotage. Douglas sent Kaiana to tell Kamehameha if the anchor was not returned the Hawaiian village on the bay would be "blown about his ears". Kaiana returned with several swimmers who dived to a depth of 20 fathoms and attached a rope to the loose anchor. Before Douglas set sail the next day Kamehameha and several chiefs came aboard unabashedly to say farewell. Kaiana decided to stay on Hawaii with Kamehameha, who promised him a rich life of honor and security, instead of returning to his native Kauai. Kaiana correctly feared that the political situation on Kauai would make his return dangerous. He became an important lieutenant of Kamehameha, leading troops into battles in support of Kamehameha, but the two had a falling out. Kaiana and his warriors eventually changed sides and fought against Kamehameha in the 1795 climactic Battle of Nuʻuanu. Kaiana was killed in that battle.

Douglas sailed to Maui, where Hawaiians again tried to cut Iphigenia's cable, then to Oahu, where yet again anchors were cut. They were recovered after Douglas threatened the local chief that "his town should be laid in ashes". Douglas and Funter sailed Iphigenia and North West America from island to island over the winter, visiting Kauai and returning to Oahu and Hawaii. In Hawaii they visited Kaiana and Kamehameha who asked to be supplied with firearms. They said that rival chiefs, including the king Kaeo of Kauai, had formed an alliance against Kamehameha and that Kaeo had been given arms and ammunition by George Dixon and Nathaniel Portlock, who were rivals with Meares and Douglas in the maritime fur trade business. Hearing this, Douglas gave Kamehameha and Kaiana firearms and ammunition, and had a swivel gun mounted on one of Kamehameha's largest canoes. When Meares published an account of his adventures in 1790 he included Douglas's statement about Dixon and Portlock supplying weapons to the Hawaiians. Dixon denied the allegation, along with numerous others in a "pamphleteer war" between Dixon and Meares in London.

Douglas returned to Oahu and Kauai near the end of winter. Mutiny broke out among the crew. One sailor, named Jones, attempted to get a loaded blunderbuss from the fore-top. Douglas fired a pistol over his head and threatened to fire again unless he surrendered. Jones was given the choice of punishment or immediate banishment ashore. He chose banishment. Douglas sailed for Niihau while other mutinous plans were made by crew members. On March 15 the quartermaster and two sailors escaped in native canoes. They were apparently planning to set fire to Iphigenia but were stopped by Friday, the friendly native of Niihau. Friday arranged for the two sailors to be returned, but the quartermaster escaped and was left behind.

In March Douglas was ready to sail back to the Pacific Northwest coast. The plan had been to sail to Alaska and cruise south, like he had done the year before. But the two ships lacked some necessary supplies and North West America had no anchor. Therefore, Douglas decided to sail directly to Nootka Sound where he hoped to meet Meares and another ship from China. On 17 March 1789 Douglas and Funter left the Hawaiian Islands for Nootka Sound.

=== Trading voyage of 1789 ===
==== Nootka Sound ====
Douglas arrived at Nootka Sound on 20 April 1789 and anchored near the Nuu-chah-nulth village of Yuquot. He discovered that the Americans Kendrick and Gray had spent the winter on the coast of Vancouver Island. Captain Kendrick visited Douglas and told him that Columbia Redivivia was anchored a few miles away in what is now called Kendrick Inlet. Captain Gray had taken Lady Washington on a cruise to the south but returned to Nootka Sound within a few days of Douglas's arrival. Douglas found that over the winter Kendrick had built a trading outpost, which he called Fort Washington. It had a house, a gun battery, a blacksmith forge, and various outbuildings. Douglas also learned that the Americans had already taken the winter's furs, arranged trading commitments from the village of Nootka Sound, gathered furs to the south, and were about to head north. Douglas knew he had to send North West America trading to the north as soon as possible.

On April 21 Douglas recorded the death of Acchon Aching. His body was taken ashore for burial—the first known case of an Asian, probably Chinese, dying and being buried in the Pacific Northwest.

Captain Funter arrived on April 24. North West America was hauled up on the beach for repairs while refurbishing of Iphigenia continued on aboard and ashore.

==== Changes in command ====
Douglas expected Meares to arrive soon in Felice with supplies for establishing a trading post in Nootka Sound and possibly elsewhere. He did not know that events in China, India, and London had caused significant changes in the plan. In Macau Meares's Portuguese partner, the merchant Carvalho, had gone bankrupt, and the governor of Macau, who was supportive of Carvalho and Meares, had died. In January 1789 Meares and his remaining partners had decided to merge their business with their former rivals, the King George's Sound Company, owned by the Etches brothers of London. In the new "Associated Merchants" company Meares stayed in Macau. His ship, Felice was sold and a new ship, Argonaut was purchased and placed under the command of James Colnett. Argonaut and Princess Royal, under Thomas Hudson, sailed from China to the Pacific Northwest coast—but did not arrive until July 1789. Because the Etches brothers had proper licenses with the East India Company and South Sea Company, so the ships sailed with British instead of Portuguese flags. Captain Colnett was given overall command of both ships as well as Douglas's Iphigenia and Funter's North West America, which were now owned by the Associated Merchants company. Until they learned about the new situation, Douglas and Funter continued to fly Portuguese flags in Nootka Sound.

When North West America was ready for sea again Funter set out on a trading voyage to the north, departing on 28 April 1789. Two days later Gray left with Lady Washington. Thus the only ships in Nootka Sound were Douglas's Iphigenia and Kendrick's Columbia when on May 6 the Spanish warship Princesa, under Esteban José Martínez, entered the harbor. Martínez had been sent by the viceroy of New Spain, Manuel Antonio Flórez, to take control of Nootka Sound and assert Spain's claim to the Northwest Coast.

==== Spanish seizure ====
At first Martínez, Douglas, and Kendrick established cordial relations. But with the arrival of the 16 gun San Carlos under Gonzalo López de Haro on May 12 Martínez's attitude changed. He arrested Douglas and his Portuguese "capitan de ruse" Viana. Iphigenia was seized and Spanish colors hoisted. The crew was taken to the two Spanish warships and the ship was emptied of supplies, cannons, trade goods, charts, and essentially all removable objects. Martínez charged that the ship was violating Spanish sovereignty and had illegally entered Spanish territory. He claimed that the ship's papers directed Iphigenia to seize any English, Russian, or Spanish ships found on the Northwest Coast and take them to Macau for piracy. Douglas responded by saying the papers had been misinterpreted. They were in Portuguese, which neither Douglas nor Martínez could read. But Martínez said his interpreters, Spanish-speaking padres, had translated the papers correctly.

Held captive on Princesa, Douglas managed to send a message to the native chief Maquinna, asking that he warn Meares's Felice and Funter's North West America should either appear. Maquinna offered to help Douglas escape in a canoe, but the captain decided not to attempt it.

Martínez put his men to work building Fort San Miguel at the entrance to Nootka Sound. He ceremonially claimed Nootka Sound for the Spanish Empire while the British and American crews watched. Preparations were made for taking the captive British and Iphigenia to San Blas, Mexico, New Spain's Pacific naval headquarters. Iphigenia was careened and the Spaniards spent considerable time and effort repairing and refitting the ship in preparation for the voyage to San Blas. Martínez did not have enough men of his own to spare and had planned to have Douglas's crew, under Spanish officers, sail Iphigenia to San Blas. However, Douglas's British and Asian crew refused to cooperate with the Spanish. On May 22, the day when they were supposed to depart, Martínez suddenly changed course, saying his interpreters had read the papers again and found them quite acceptable. Martínez dropped the charges against Douglas and released Iphigenia and its crew. He did, however, make Douglas sign a paper stating that the British had been well treated. He also said that if the Viceroy Flores later ruled that it had been valid to seize Iphigenia, then the firm of the Portuguese merchant Carvalho would have to pay a proper forfeit.

==== Release and departure ====
Although Martínez was suspicious, Douglas convinced him that his only desire was to sail to China. Martínez supplied Douglas with what he thought was a minimal amount of equipment, food, and other supplies for a direct voyage to Macau via Hawaii. Douglas promised both the Spanish and the Americans that he had no intention of remaining on the Northwest Coast to collect furs. On June 1 he was allowed to depart. By the late afternoon Iphigenia, flying Portuguese colors, was sailing southwest from Nootka Sound, as though headed for Hawaii. At midnight, however, Douglas ordered the ship to change course and head north. He knew that Martínez was not ready to send San Carlos north to patrol the coast, and he did not think Kendrick would be allowed to leave until San Carlos was ready. Douglas wrote "the interval was therefore mine". He did not have enough furs to turn a profit in China and "my people had been accustomed to short allowances". So he went north to collect more sea otter furs.

Douglas hoped he might encounter Funter and North West America, but they missed each other. On June 8 Funter entered Nootka Sound and found it occupied by Martínez. In a series of events similar to what had happened to Douglas and Iphigenia, Funter and his crew were soon arrested and North West America seized. Martínez wanted to hold North West America as security for payments for the repairs and supplies he had given to Iphigenia. North West America was never returned to the British, it became a Spanish ship, renamed Santa Gertrudis la Magna and, later, Santa Saturnina. The small vessel was used by the Spanish for several exploration voyages, including José María Narváez's discovery and exploration of the Strait of Georgia in 1791.

==== Northern trading ====
After changing course on June 2 Douglas took Iphigenia north to the area he had traded in the year before—Hecate Strait, Dixon Entrance, the Alexander Archipelago, and Haida Gwaii (the Queen Charlotte Islands), trading with the natives for sea otter furs. On the north coast of Graham Island Douglas stopped at Kiusta, the village of the Haida chief Cuneah (or "Blakow-Coneehaw"). Upon arrival the chief, who had met Douglas the year before, came aboard while 200 villagers sang songs. Cuneah honored Douglas by "exchanging names". Despite some tension and dangerous incidents between the Haida and the crew of Iphigenia, Douglas and Cuneah departed on very friendly terms. On June 23 Douglas took Iphigenia to "Tartanee", which Douglas described as a populous Haida village of "great wooden images". For several days the crew traded with the Haida, during which time Douglas noted a garden that had probably been planted by the American Robert Gray. Douglas assisted by planting beans. By late June Iphigenia was completely out of trade goods and all other items desired by the Haida, such as clothes, pots, kettles, and metal items in general. Most of Douglas's trade goods had been seized by Martínez at Nootka Sound. Nonetheless when Iphigenia reached the open ocean on 28 June 1789 Douglas had 760 prime sea otter skins in the hold—far more than the 60-70 he had when leaving Nootka Sound a month before.

==== Voyage to China ====
Douglas set sail for Hawaii, unaware that during the month since he left Nootka Sound two other ships of the Associated Merchants, North West America and Princess Royal, had been detained by Martínez at Nootka Sound, and within a week James Colnett and Argonaut would also be seized, triggering the international incident known as the Nootka Crisis.

Iphigenia arrived at Kealakekua Bay in Hawaii on July 20, where the Hawaiians attempted to capture the ship, probably with Kamehameha's approval. By July 28 Iphigenia was anchored at Waikiki on Oahu. Completely out of articles of trade the crew began cutting up rudder chains to exchange for provisions. After cruising to other islands and stocking up on fresh water and yams, Douglas had Iphigenia set sail for China on August 10. The voyage to Macau was uneventful and Iphigenia arrived on 5 October 1789.

In Macau Douglas met with Meares and gave him his first report about the clash with the Spaniards in Nootka Sound. It was an incomplete report because Iphigenia had left before the other British ships had arrived and been seized. Nonetheless, Douglas's report helped set Britain on the course toward an international crisis. Not long after Douglas reached Macau the American ship Columbia arrived, under Robert Gray, who brought an account of the later events of the Nootka Crisis.

== Captain of Grace ==
The Nootka Crisis effectively ended Meares's and the Associated Merchants fur trading ventures. Meares returned to England. Douglas, however, continued to work in the maritime fur trade but with American rather than British partners. In the spring of 1790, in Macau, Douglas left Meares's Associated Merchants company and joined with an American venture. He was given command of Grace, a schooner from New York. The American fur trader John Kendrick was having some difficulties in Macau and was unable to leave. He approached Douglas for assistance and the two captains arranged to work with each other. Kendrick's first mate, Davis Coolidge, joined Douglas as first officer of Grace, and Douglas agreed to pick up some men Kendrick had left in Hawaii to gather sandalwood.

During the summer of 1790 Douglas took Grace to the Pacific Northwest Coast to trade for furs. On the way back to Macau he stopped in Hawaii and picked up Kendrick's cargo of sandalwood and the two men who had been left to collect it. Douglas found that warfare was intensifying in Hawaii and the islands were becoming more dangerous. The maritime fur trader Simon Metcalfe had massacred hundreds of Native Hawaiians at Olowalu. In a separate event his son, Thomas Humphrey Metcalfe had been killed along with all but one of his crew, and his schooner, Fair American, had been captured.

When Douglas reached China he took Grace up the Pearl River to Guangzhou (Canton) and sold a rich cargo of furs. Then he sailed back down the river to join up with Kendrick, who had been working on Lady Washington in Dirty Butter Bay near Macau. Kendrick had remade Washington into a heavily armed two-masted brig or brigantine. The work had drained Kendrick's funds. The sandalwood shipment Douglas brought turned out to be a type low in aromatic oils and therefore not worth very much. To help Kendrick with provisioning and buying trade goods Douglas lent him $2,320.

Kendrick was planning to return to the Pacific Northwest Coast by way of Japan. At the time Japan's policy of sakoku strictly limited foreign trade. Meares and company had intended to attempt to open British trade with Japan, but the Nootka Crisis had put an end to that. Douglas agreed to join Kendrick in the venture, but he leaked word of the plan to the British. An officer of the Royal Navy who was in Macau sent word to London and the British court launched new efforts toward opening trade with Japan, but not before Kendrick and Douglas made their attempt.

Just before Douglas and Kendrick left Macau, in the spring of 1791, China declared a complete embargo on the trade in sea otter furs, due to a war between China and Russia. This further justified the risk of trying to open the sea otter fur trade with Japan.

As the two ships approached Japan they were caught in a storm and swept toward the Kii Peninsula by the Kuroshio Current. Seeking shelter they entered the channel between the village of Koza on the mainland and the island Kii Ōshima, then moved into a protected bay behind the island, near the fishing village of Kushimoto. The village headman, Kichigo, sent a message to the daimyō at Wakayama Castle, as did the headman of Koza village. After the storm passed a few villagers approached the ships, despite the law forbidding contact with foreigners. Kendrick invited them on board Washington and a few did. Some of the Chinese crewmen were able to communicate via written notes. They said they had been driven to port by the storm and would not stay more than three to five days, but also that they carried trade goods, especially sea otter furs. Kendrick and Douglas soon discovered that the Japanese had no interest in sea otter fur and regarding the wearing of fur as barbaric. The persistent rumor that there was a rich, untapped fur market in Japan proved false. The villagers dissuaded Kendrick and Douglas from visiting Osaka, saying they would be arrested and their ships confiscated.

When the daimyo at Wakayama Castle received the messages about the ships, a few days after they arrived, he mobilized his troops. Kendrick and Douglas, perhaps having heard about the troops, left on May 17, about ten days after they had arrived. The troops arrived two days later. In the aftermath Japan established a new system of alarms and patrols for coastal villages.

A few days after leaving the Kii Peninsula Douglas and Kendrick found a group of islands they named the Water Islands. They decided to separate at that point. Both ships made for the Pacific Northwest Coast.

Douglas sailed Grace to Haida Gwaii (the Queen Charlotte Islands) and apparently secured a fair number of sea otter skins. At the end of the 1791 trading season Douglas returned to China but died during the voyage. R.D. Coolidge replaced him as captain of Grace.

== Legacy ==
Iphigenia Bay, in Alaska, is named for Douglas's ship, as is Iphigenia Point in British Columbia. In Haida Gwaii (the Queen Charlotte Islands), Coneehaw Rock is named for a Haida chief with whom Douglas traded and exchanged names. Douglas Rock is located nearby.

Dixon Entrance, between British Columbia and Alaska, was given the name Douglass Entrance by Meares.
