= John Meares =

British navigator, explorer and fur trader (c. 1756 – 1809)

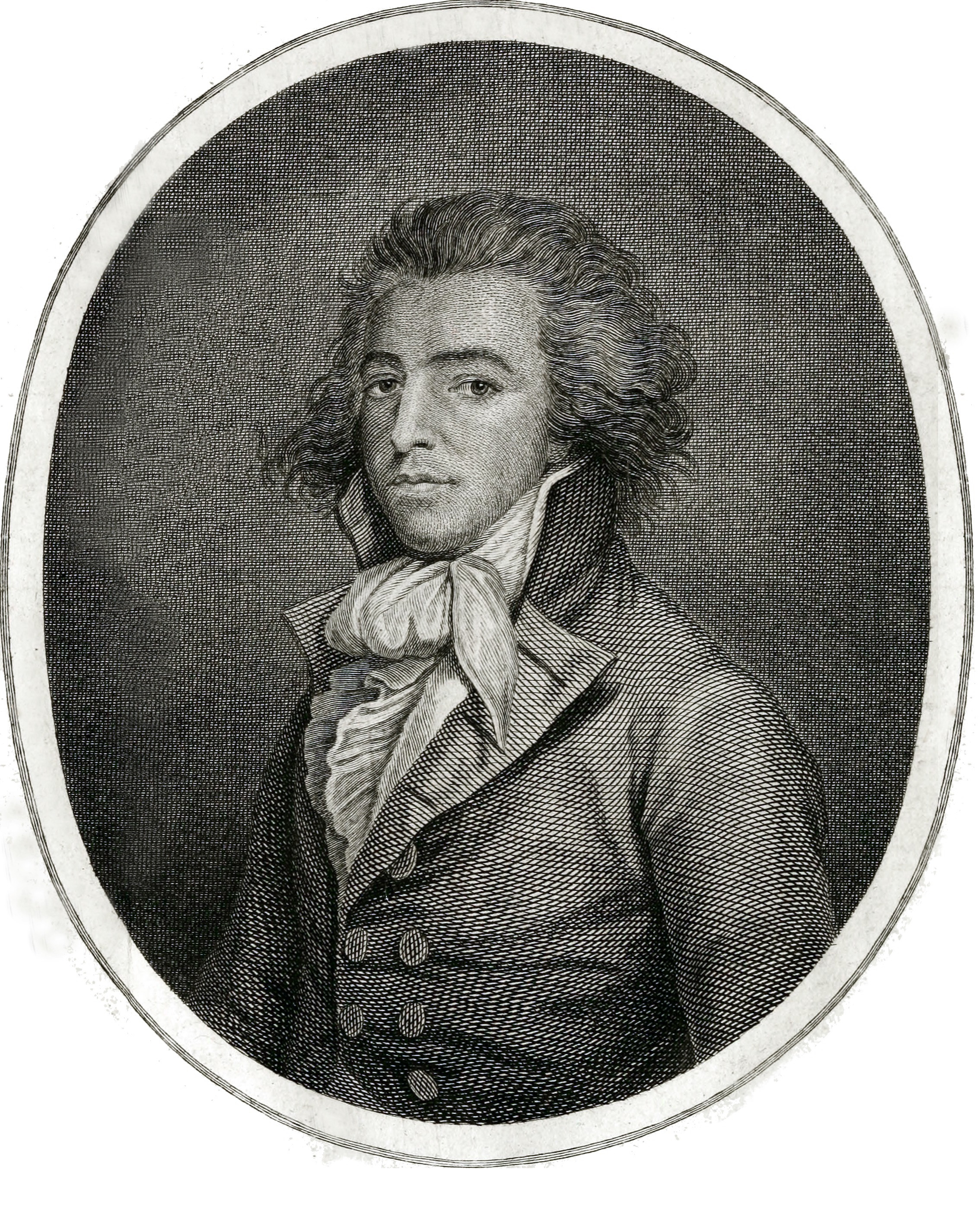
- Lieutenant John Meares. From an engraving after the picture by W. Beechey in Meares' Voyages.
- Born: c. 1756; Ireland
- Died: 29 January 1809; Bath, United Kingdom
- Occupations: Naval officer (Royal Navy), explorer, fur trader

John Meares (c. 1756 – 1809) was an Irish navigator, explorer, and maritime fur trader in service of Great Britain during the late 18th century. He is best known for his voyages to the Pacific Northwest; and from his base in Canton (modern day Guangzhou) he was deeply involved in organising a private network of British trade in China and the wider Pacific outside of the monopoly of the East India Company. His activities precipitated the Nootka Crisis, which brought Britain and Spain to the brink of war. He is also known for his early efforts to open up trade between feudal Japan and Great Britain.

== Career ==
Meares' father was Charles Meares, "formerly an attorney of great eminence, and for several years pursuivant of his Majesty's Court of Exchequer in Dublin". In 1771, Meares joined the Royal Navy as a captain's servant and was commissioned a lieutenant in 1778. In 1783 he joined the merchant service and in 1785, based in India, formed the Northwest America Company for collecting sea otter furs by trade with the indigenous peoples of the Pacific Northwest Coast and selling them in China. The East India Company held a monopoly on British trade in the Pacific and required all British traders to be licensed with the company and pay duties. Meares did not license his ships with the East India Company and instead tried to conceal the illegal activity by using the flag of Portugal. Meares registered his ships in Macau, a Portuguese colony in China. Non-British ships were not required to have licences from the East India Company.

He sailed from Calcutta on 12 March 1786, in the Nootka, a vessel of 200 tons (bm), with which he explored part of the coast of Alaska. He spent the winter of 1786–1787 in Prince William Sound with poor provisions; his men suffered from the weather and scurvy. Twenty-three of his men died of scurvy and the remaining ten were saved only by the timely arrival of Captain George Dixon, a British trader with proper licences, in the Queen Charlotte. Meares gave Dixon his bond never to trade in the Northwest again, and returned to China by way of the Sandwich Islands. Showing no gratitude to Dixon, Meares proceeded to sue him for allegedly overcharging him for the supplies that saved his life.

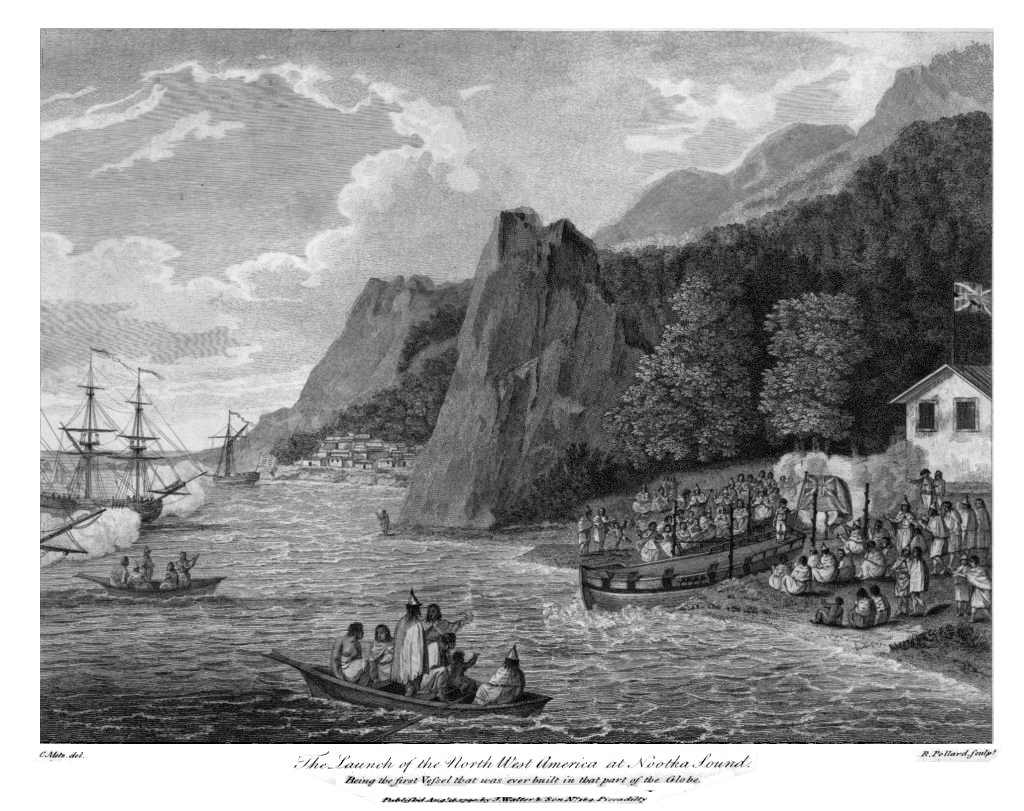
The launch of the North West America at Nootka Sound, 1788

In 1788, and in total violation of what he had told Dixon, Meares started a new expedition with two vessels and more false papers. The ships sailed under the Portuguese flag and were given Portuguese names: the Felice Adventurero, captained by Meares, and the Iphigenia Nubiana, under William Douglas. The names are spelled in various ways, such as Feliz Aventureira and Efigenia Nubiana. They sailed from China on 22 January 1788 and arrived at Nootka Sound, on Vancouver Island in May. Using Nootka Sound as a base of operations he spent the summer trading for furs along the coasts of present-day British Columbia and Washington down to after having sailed as far south as Cape Lookout, having missed the Columbia River at Cape Disappointment.

On board Felice Adventurero for the 1788 voyage from China to Nootka Sound was Comekela, younger brother of Maquinna, chief of the Mowachaht Nuu-chah-nulth people of the Nootka Sound area. Comekela had sailed from Nootka Sound to China in 1786-87 with James Hanna.

Meares later claimed that Maquinna, a chief of the Nuu-chah-nulth (Nootka) people, sold him some land on the shore of Friendly Cove in Nootka Sound, in exchange for some pistols and trade goods, and that on this land some kind of building was erected. These claims would become a key point in Britain's position during the Nootka Crisis. Spain strongly disputed both claims, and the true facts of the matter have never been fully established. Maquinna himself later called Meares a liar and denied selling him any land. The land and building aside, there is no doubt that Meares' men, and a group of Chinese workers they brought, built the sloop North West America. It was launched in September 1788, the first non-Indigenous vessel built in the Pacific Northwest.

In September Meares left, sailing the Felice Adventurero to China. The Iphigenia Nubiana and North West America wintered in the Hawaiian Islands. While on the island of Kauai, Meares picked up a Hawaiian chief or "prince of Attooi" (Kauai) by the name of Tianna (Kaʻiana – also spelled Tyaana & Tyanna), whom he took aboard his ship. He took Tianna to Guangzhou (Canton), China, where Meares found a Hawaiian woman by the name of Wynee, who had been left there by captain Charles William Barkley of the Imperial Eagle. Eventually, Meares returned Tianna to his homeland but Wynee died of illness on the voyage home. Wynee and Tianna are considered the first two Hawaiians to have traveled abroad. Later, Meares gained possession of Barkley's nautical gear and his journal. Barkley's wife, Frances Barkley, later wrote that Meares, "with the greatest effrontery, published and claimed the merit of my husband's discoveries therein contained, besides inventing lies of the most revolting nature tending to vilify the person he thus pilfered."

During the winter of 1788–89 Meares was in Guangzhou (Canton), China, where he and others formed a partnership called the Associated Merchants Trading to the Northwest Coast of America. Plans were made for more ships to sail to the Pacific Northwest in 1789, including the Princess Royal, under Thomas Hudson, and the Argonaut under James Colnett. The consolidation of the fur trading companies of Meares and the Etches (King George's Sound Company) resulted in James Colnett being given the overall command. Meares instructed Colnett to establish a permanent fur trading post at Nootka Sound based on the foothold accomplished by Meares the year before. The Iphigenia Nubiana and North West America were to join the Argonaut and Princess Royal at Nootka Sound. Meares himself remained in China.

=== Nootka Crisis ===
While the British fur traders were getting organized, the Spanish were continuing their effort to secure the Pacific Northwest. At first the Spanish were responding mainly to Russian activity in Alaska. On a 1788 voyage to Alaska, Esteban José Martínez had learned that the Russians were intending to establish a fortified outpost at Nootka Sound. This, in addition to the increasing use of Nootka Sound by British fur traders, resulted in the Spanish decision to assert sovereignty on the northwest coast once and for all. Plans were laid for Nootka Sound to be colonized. Spain hoped to establish and maintain sovereignty on the entire coast as far north as the Russia posts in Prince William Sound. The Viceroy of New Spain, Manuel Antonio Flórez, instructed Martínez to occupy Nootka Sound, build some kind of structure, and to make it clear that Spain was setting up a formal establishment.

Martínez arrived at Nootka Sound on 5 May 1789. He found three ships already there. One was Meares' Iphigenia Nubiana. Martínez seized the ship and arrested its captain, William Douglas. After a few days Martínez released Douglas and his ship and ordered him to leave and not return. Douglas heeded the warning. The other two ships were American, the Columbia Rediviva and the Lady Washington, under John Kendrick and Robert Gray, which had wintered at Nootka Sound. Over the summer a number of other ships arrived. The vessels of Meares' company were all seized on the grounds of violating Spanish rights of trade and navigation on the coast. The North West America was renamed Santa Saturnina and used by José María Narváez to explore the Strait of Georgia in 1791.

When news of the seizures reached Meares in China he sailed to England. He arrived in April 1790, confirmed various rumors, claimed to have bought land and built a settlement at Nootka before Martínez, and generally fanned the flames of anti-Spanish feelings. He submitted a report to the Home secretary William Wyndham Grenville, in which he exaggerated the permanence of his settlement in Nootka Sound and the financial losses sustained by his company. In May the issue was taken up in the House of Commons as the Royal Navy began to make preparations for hostilities. An ultimatum was delivered to Spain, who without the support of France, capitulated to British terms. The subsequent Nootka Convention led to George Vancouver's historic voyage in HMS Discovery.

=== Later life ===
In 1790, Meares published Voyages Made in the Years 1788 and 1789, from China to the North West Coast of America in 1790. It gained widespread attention, especially in light of the developing Nootka Crisis. Meares not only described his voyages to the northwest coast, but put forward a grand vision of a new economic network based in the Pacific, joining in trade widely separated regions such as the Pacific Northwest, China, Japan, Hawaii, and England. His vision required a loosening of the monopolistic power of the East India Company and the South Sea Company, which between them controlled all British trade in the Pacific. Meares argued strongly for loosening their power. His vision eventually came to pass, in its general form, but not before the long struggle of the Napoleonic Wars was over. Meares' Voyages also caused a controversy; Meares' criticisms of George Dixon led the latter to publish a pamphlet about Meares' self-aggrandizement and false claims of discoveries made by others. Meares' claim that Captain Robert Gray had circumnavigated Vancouver island was disclaimed by Gray himself. The explorations of Captain George Vancouver disproved a number of Meares' other claims. Nonetheless, Meares' claims formed a basis for negotiation of British title to Oregon and British Columbia.

Not much is known of Meares' life after the settlement of the Nootka controversy. So far as is known he received none of the Spanish indemnity money. He was rewarded for his role by promotion to the rank of commander on 26 February 1795. The marriage of "John Meares Esq. of Frome, [Cornwall], to Miss Mary Anne Guilleband, at the Abbey church, Bath" was noted in The Whitehall Evening Post of 9 July 1796. Meares apparently considered Bath his home after his retirement from the Navy, and according to his "last will and testament" he owned property in Jamaica. The death of John Meares, "a Commander in his Majesty’s Navy", at Bath on 29 January 1809, was noted in a newspaper advertisement by his solicitors inviting his creditors to a meeting at the George and Vulture Tavern, Cornhill, London, to take consideration of the state of his affairs. The value of his estate when probated was estimated to be under £7,500. His will listed no spouse or child, but a brother and sister were among the beneficiaries. Perhaps his wife, the former Mary Ann Guilliband, whom he married in 1796, was already deceased.

== Legacy ==
A number of places in the Pacific Northwest bear the name of Meares:

- Cape Meares, Oregon
- Meares Island, located in the entrance of Clayoquot Sound, British Columbia.
- Meares Point, British Columbia
- Meares Bluff, British Columbia
- Meares Glacier, Alaska
- Meares Passage, Alaska
- Meares Island, Alaska
- Meares Point, Alaska
- Port Meares, Alaska
- Felice Island, British Columbia, named for Meares' ship
- Felice Strait, Alaska, also named for Meares' ship

== See also ==
- Fenis and St. Joseph
- Lot's Wife (crag)
