= King George (1785 ship) =

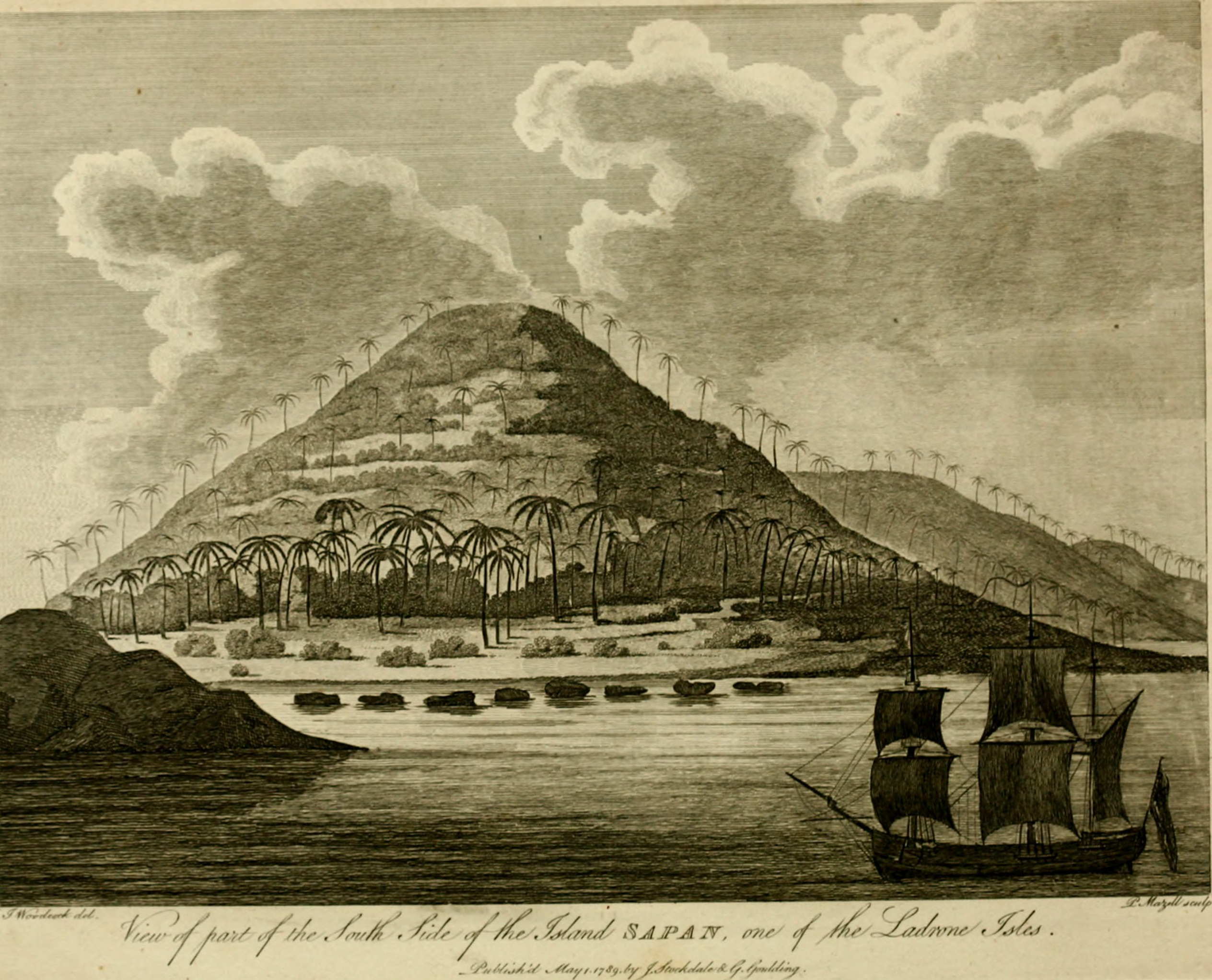
- King George at Saipan

History

Great Britain
- Name: King George
- Namesake: George III of the United Kingdom
- Owner: 1785: Etches & Co. (King George's Sound Company); 1789:R. Brown; 1796:W. Cass
- Builder: South Shields (Note: The information on the tons burthen, builder, year of launch, and owner differs between two generally high-quality sources, Hackman and Clayton. In this case it is clear that Clayton is correct. Clayton's data matches that in Lloyd's Register (1786), while Hackman's data matches that for the King George one line above the present King George. Also, Hackman misidentifies King George as one of the vessels of the First Fleet, which it was not.)
- Launched: 1785
- Fate: No longer listed after 1796

General characteristics
- Tons burthen: 279, 305, or 320 (bm)
- Complement: 59

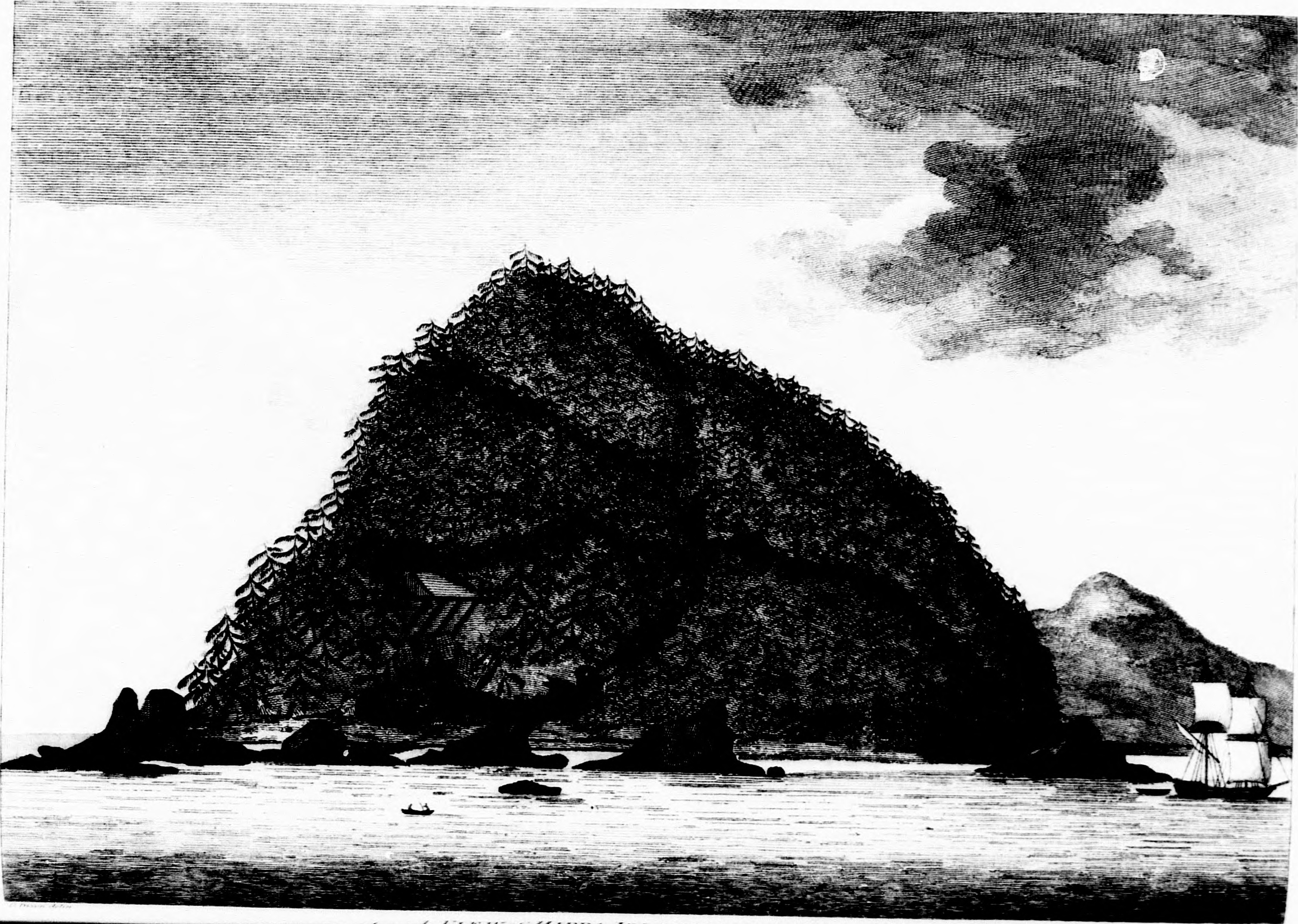
King George at Hippa Island

King George was a British merchant ship engaged in whaling and the maritime fur trade in the late 18th century. She was launched in 1785, and taken up by the King George's Sound Company. She sailed in 1785 on a voyage of exploration, together with the Queen Charlotte. The two vessels whaled in the South Seas and sought furs in the Pacific Northwest. They returned to England via Guangzhou (Canton), where they picked up cargoes for the British East India Company (EIC). Their voyage accomplished a circumnavigation of the world. On her return new owners apparently sailed her between Britain and South Carolina. She is no longer listed after 1796.

== Voyage (1785-1788) ==
In 1785, Richard Cadman Etches and partners, including Nathaniel Portlock and George Dixon, formed a partnership, commonly called the King George's Sound Company, to develop the fur trade. Portlock and Dixon had served in the Pacific on James Cook's third voyage. In September 1785, Portlock, in King George, and Dixon, in the smaller Queen Charlotte, sailed from England. They sailed together for most of their three-year voyage. They crossed the Atlantic Ocean, reaching Port Egmont, in the Falkland Islands, on 5 January 1786. They then transited Cape Horn to enter the Pacific Ocean. They reached the Hawaiian Islands on 24 May, and anchored in Kealakekua Bay (where Cook had been killed in 1779), but did not go ashore. They took on fresh food at other Hawaiian Islands and proceeded on to what is now Alaska.

After two years of plying the waters, Portlock and Dixon departed North America, reaching Macao in November 1787.

In China Portlock picked up a cargo for the British East India Company. Homeward bound, Portlock sailed from China 10 February 1788, and on 13 March reached North Island, the northmost of three islands in the bay that formed the principle anchorage of Enggano Island. King George reached St Helena on 13 June, and arrived at The Downs on 23 August.

On their return Portlock and Dixon each published accounts of their voyage.

Year	Master	Owner	Trade
1789	Illegible; Johnson	R. Brown	London—South Carolina
1790	J.Johnson; A. Dansis	R. Brown	London—South Carolina
1795	A. Dansis	R. Brown	London—Charleston
1796	R. Hern	W. Cass	London—South Carolina

== Fate ==
No longer listed after 1796.

== See also ==
- List of historical ships in British Columbia
