= Queen Charlotte (1785 ship) =

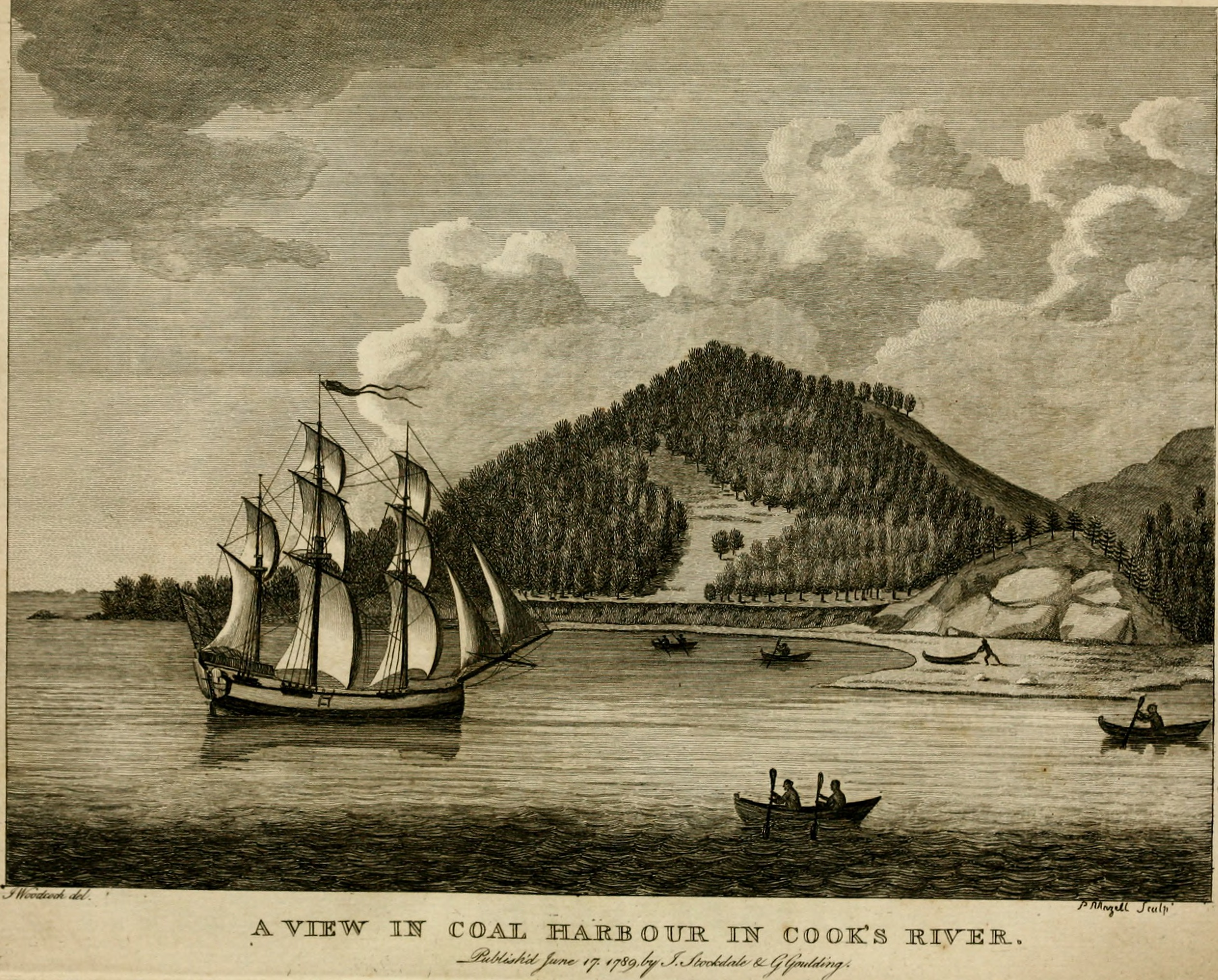
- Queen Charlotte, Captain Dixon (1789) at Kealakekua Bay

History

Great Britain
- Name: Queen Charlotte
- Namesake: Charlotte, the queen consort of King George III
- Owner: Etches & Co. (King George's Sound Company)
- Builder: Stockton
- Launched: 1785
- Renamed: Montreal (1789)
- Fate: Seized 1 February 1793

General characteristics
- Tons burthen: 200, or 220, (bm)
- Sail plan: Snow
- Complement: 33

Queen Charlotte was a British merchant ship launched in 1785 at Stockton for Etches & Co. Between September 1785 and 1788 she made a circumnavigation of the world in company with another ship that the company owned, the King George. The two vessels were engaged in the Maritime Fur Trade in the Pacific northwest. They sold their furs in China and returned to England with cargoes that they were carrying back for the British East India Company (EIC). In 1789 she was renamed Montreal. She was at Bordeaux at the outbreak of war with France in 1793 and the French government seized her.

== Voyage (1785–1788) ==
In 1785 Richard Cadman Etches and partners, including Nathaniel Portlock and George Dixon, formed a partnership, commonly called the King George's Sound Company, to develop the fur trade. Portlock and Dixon had served in the Pacific on James Cook's third voyage. In September 1785 Portlock, in King George, and Dixon, in the smaller Queen Charlotte, sailed from England. They sailed together for most of their three-year voyage. They crossed the Atlantic Ocean, reaching the Falkland Islands in January 1786, and transited Cape Horn to enter the Pacific Ocean. They reached the Hawaiian Islands on 24 May and anchored in Kealakekua Bay (where Cook had been killed in 1779), but did not go ashore. They took on fresh food at other Hawaiian islands and proceeded on to what is now Alaska. Dixon reached the Haida Gwaii islands and named them the "Queen Charlotte Islands" after his ship. After two years of plying the waters, Portlock and Dixon departed North America, reaching Macao in November 1787.

While King George and Queen Charlotte were in China, the EIC chartered them to take cargoes back to England. Captain Dixon crossed the Second Bar on 7 February 1788, and on 14 March reached North Island, the northmost of three islands in the bay that formed the principle anchorage of Enggano Island. Queen Charlotte then reached St Helena on 18 June and arrived at The Downs on 18 September.

As there is no online copy of Lloyd's Register (LR) for 1788, so she is next known in Lloyd's Register for 1789 with the notation that new owners had changed her name to Montreal.

Year	Vessel	Master	Owner	Trade	Source & notes
1789	Queen Charlotte			London	LR; now the Montreal, Martin
1789	Montreal	L.Martin	Phyne & Co.	London–Jamaica	LR
1792	Montreal	L.Martin; S.Palmer	Phyne & Co. Jenkin & Co.	London–Jamaica; London–Bordeaux	LR

== Fate ==
Montreal was at Bordeaux ion 1 February 1793 when France declared war on England. The French seized her and some other British vessel there.

Montreal was last listed in 1793.

== See also ==
- List of historical ships in British Columbia
