= King George's Sound Company =

British maritime trade company

The King George's Sound Company, also known as Richard Cadman Etches and Company after its "prime mover and principal investor", was an English company formed in 1785 to engage in the maritime fur trade on the northwest coast of North America. The company had nine partners in 1785: Richard Cadman Etches (merchant of London), John Hanning (gentleman of Dowlich, Devon), William Etches (merchant of Ashbourne, Derbyshire), Mary Camilla Brook (tea dealer of London), William Etches (merchant of Northampton), John Etches (merchant of London), Nathaniel Gilmour (merchant of Gosport, Hampshire), Nathaniel Portlock (captain), and George Dixon (captain). No change in the list of partners after 1785 has been found.

Richard Etches and his associates were able to obtain licenses from the South Sea Company and the East India Company (EIC), the former allowing them to trade and explore, the latter giving permission to sell goods in China.

Two ships left England in early 1785, the 320-ton King George under Nathaniel Portlock, and the 200-ton Queen Charlotte under George Dixon, with Portlock in overall command. Both men had sailed with Captain James Cook on his third expedition and were therefore familiar with the region. They crossed the Atlantic Ocean, reaching the Falkland Islands in January 1786, and transited Cape Horn to enter the Pacific Ocean. They reached the Hawaiian Islands on 24 May and anchored in Kealakekua Bay (where Cook had been killed in 1779), but did not go ashore. They took on fresh food at other Hawaiian Islands and proceeded on to what is now Alaska. After two years of plying the waters, Portlock and Dixon departed North America, reaching Macao in November 1787. From Macao, both vessels returned to England with cargoes for the EIC. Queen Charlotte went on to make a second voyage for the EIC, but under a new master.

Two other company ships arrived in 1787, reaching the west coast of Vancouver Island in July, Prince of Wales, commanded by James Colnett, and Princess Royal, under Charles Duncan. Colnett and Duncan separated in 1788, but eventually rendezvoused and proceeded in early 1789 to Canton to sell their furs at a good profit, making this voyage "one of the more successful ones of the period".

In April 1787, Richard Etches dispatched Duke of York, a ship he had acquired, to reinforce the settlement at New Years Harbour (now Puerto Ano Nuevo) on Staten Island (now Isla de los Estados), off Tierra del Fuego. Seal hunters had established a factory there in 1786, which was also well-located for vessels rounding Cape Horn to refresh and replenish their water. On 11 September, shortly after she arrived at New Years Harbour, Duke of York was lost. Her crew, however, was saved. The loss of Duke of York ended the factory. The people took to their boats and left the island.

The King George's Sound Company merged with that of John Meares on 23 January 1789. The new company placed Colnett in command of the 120-ton Argonaut. However, when Colnett returned to Nootka Sound on Vancouver Island, he became embroiled in the Nootka Crisis; he and his crew were arrested and their ship seized by the Spanish. After a treaty was eventually signed by the Spanish and British, the company tried unsuccessfully to obtain compensation for its losses from the Spanish.

As it turned out, there was no great profit to be made from the trade in sea otter pelts (except by the Russians), and the company ceased sending ships.

== See also ==
- List of trading companies

== Sources ==
- Gallois, Robert (2011) A Voyage to the North West Side of America: The Journals of James Colnett, 1786-89. (UBC Press). ISBN 9780774808552
