= George Dixon (Royal Navy officer) =

English explorer (1748–1795)

Captain George Dixon
- Born: 1748; Kirkoswald, Cumbria
- Died: 11 November 1795 (aged 46–47); Bermuda
- Military career
- Allegiance: United Kingdom
- Branch: Royal Navy
- Service years: c. 1776–1791
- Commands: Queen Charlotte

George Dixon (1748 – 11 November 1795) was a British sea captain, explorer, and maritime fur trader active in the North Pacific in the late 18th century. He was born in Leath Ward area and came from the village of Kirkoswald. The son of Thomas Dixon, he was baptised in Kirkoswald on 8 July 1748.

He served in the Royal Navy during Captain James Cook's third voyage and later took part in early British commercial expeditions to the north-west coast of North America. From 1785 to 1788, Dixon commanded the Queen Charlotte for the King George’s Sound Company, trading and exploring along the coasts of present-day British Columbia, southeastern Alaska, and Hawai'i. He was among the first Europeans to identify Haida Gwaii as an island group and contributed to the early maritime fur trade linking the Pacific Northwest with China and Britain. After returning to England, he published an account of his voyage and became involved in disputes over exploration claims and British settlement plans. He later settled in Bermuda, where he died in 1795.

== Service under Captain Cook ==
He served under Captain Cook in his third voyage, on HMS Resolution, as armourer. In the course of the voyage he learned about the commercial possibilities along the North West Coast of America.

History has not served Dixon well; for he is the least known of those who served and or were taught by Captain Cook and is only rarely mentioned in history books. When he is mentioned, he is relegated to a minor figure, overshadowed by the more dramatic figures of Cook and William Bligh, another officer on Cook's ill-fated third trip.

== Work with William Bolts ==
In 1782, George Dixon was engaged by William Bolts. The Wiener Zeitung newspaper of 29 June 1782 carried a report from Fiume that, "in the early days of this month, Mr. von Bolts, Director of the Triestine East India Company, together with the English captain, Mr. Digson, arrived in this city". George Dixon wrote in the introduction to his account of the voyage he made for the Etches Company to the North West Coast in 1785–1788:

So early as 1781, William Bolts, Esq; fitted out the Cobenzell, an armed ship of 700 tons, for the North-West Coast of America. She was to have sailed from Trieste (accompanied by a tender of forty-five tons) under Imperial colours, and was equally fitted out for trade or discovery: men of eminence in every department of science were engaged on board; all the maritime Courts of Europe were written to, in order to secure a good reception for these vessels, at their respective ports, and favourable answers were returned; yet, after all, this expedition, so exceedingly promising in every point of view, was overcome by a set of interested men, then in power in Vienna.

The Triestine Society sent the Cobenzell in September 1783 on a commercial voyage to the Malabar Coast and China by way of the Cape of Good Hope. After leaving Trieste, she proceeded to Marseille, where she took in the principal part of her cargo and departed that port in December. Apparently, Bolts still wished to carry out his North West Coast venture in connection with this voyage, and asked George Dixon to participate. However, Dixon went back to England, where he attempted to interest Sir Joseph Banks and English merchants in the North West Coast fur trade. This resulted in the formation of the Etches consortium, of which Dixon became a member with appointment as captain of the Queen Charlotte. The similarity is notable between the plan of the consortium and that elaborated by Bolts, which was apparently communicated to them by Dixon.

== King George's Sound Company and Pacific voyage ==
In 1785, Dixon became a partner in Richard Cadman Etches and Company, commonly called the King George's Sound Company to develop fur trade in present-day British Columbia and Alaska. In September 1785 Dixon and fellow trader Nathaniel Portlock sailed from England. Portlock was in command of the larger vessel, the 320-ton bm King George, with a crew of 59. Dixon commanded the 200 ton (bm) Queen Charlotte, with a crew of 33. Dixon and Portlock sailed together for most of their three-year voyage.

== North West Coast exploration ==
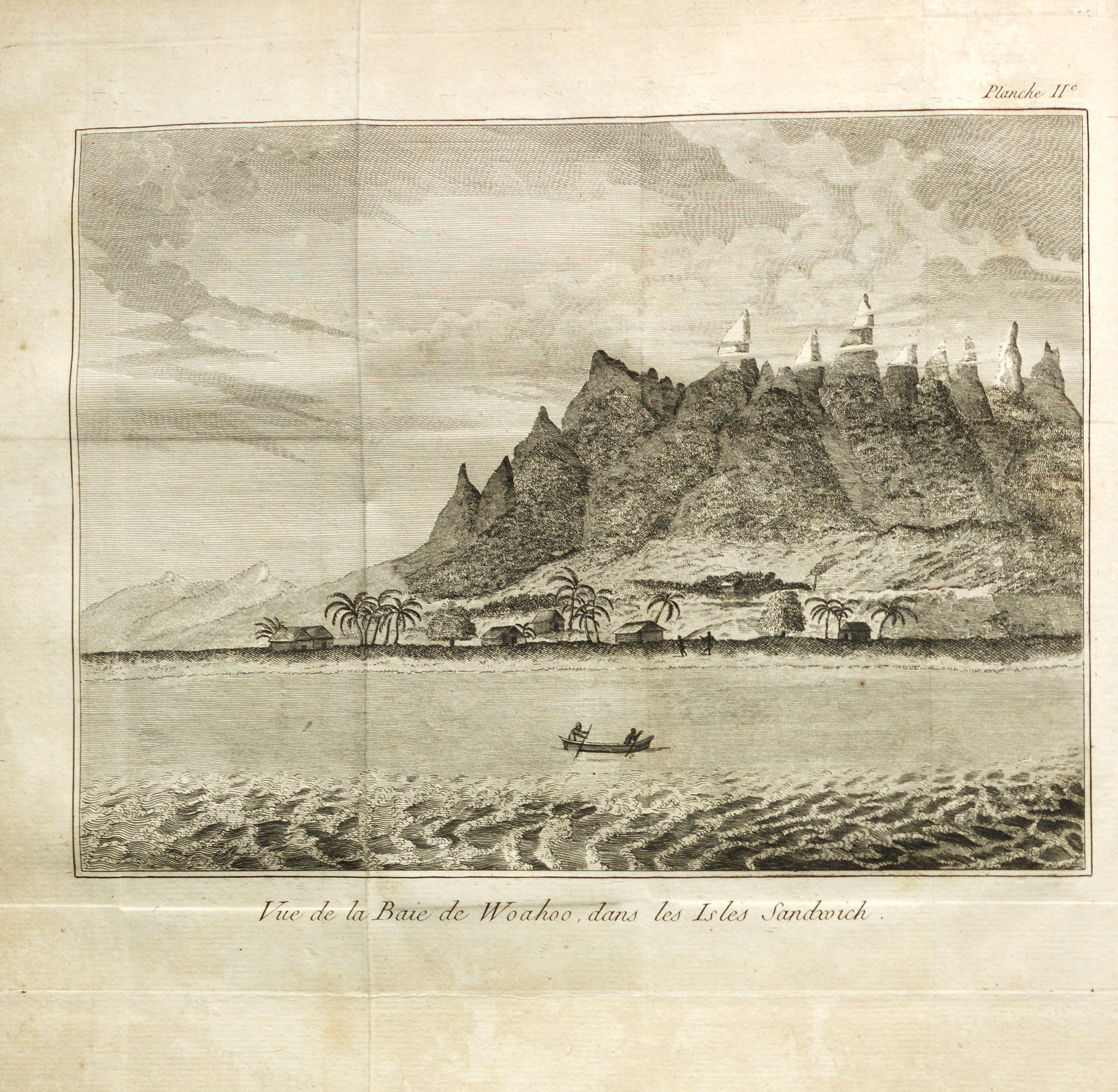
Illustration of Oahu, from the French translation of Dixon's book A Voyage Round the World

In the summers of 1786 and 1787, Dixon explored the shores of present-day British Columbia and southeastern Alaska. He spent the intervening winter in the Hawaiian Islands, where he became the first European to visit the island of Molokaʻi. He anchored in Kealakekua Bay, where Cook had been killed, but did not come ashore.

His chief areas of exploration were Haida Gwaii and Queen Charlotte Sound, Yakutat Bay (Port Mulgrave), Sitka Sound (Norfolk Bay), and the Dixon Entrance. While not the first European to explore the region of Haida Gwaii, he was the first to realize they were islands and not part of the mainland. He named them after his ship, "Queen Charlotte Islands". This was the official Canadian name for the archipelago until 2010 when they were renamed "Haida Gwaii". On the northwestern part of Graham Island he acquired a large number of sea otter cloaks in trade with the Haida of Kiusta, under Chief Cuneah. Because of the many cloaks, he named the bay where he anchored "Cloak Bay".

== Publications and disputes ==
After visiting China and selling his cargo, he returned to England in 1788 and published, in 1789, A Voyage Round the World, but More Particularly to the North-West Coast of America. The book was a collection of descriptive letters by William Beresford, his cargo officer, and valuable charts and appendices by Dixon.

There was a controversy between Dixon and John Meares, another explorer who had published a book claiming credit for discoveries Dixon thought were made by others. This controversy resulted in three pamphlets by Dixon and Meares denouncing each other.

In 1789 Dixon met with Alexander Dalrymple, the Examiner of Sea Journals for the East India Company and an influential advocate of maritime exploration, and the Under-Secretary of the Home and Colonial Office, Evan Nepean. He urged on Nepean the need to take up Dalrymple's plan for a settlement on the North West Coast to prevent the Russians, Americans or Spanish from establishing themselves there. Dixon was afraid that if nothing was done the coast and its trade would be lost to Britain. On 20 October 1789, he wrote to Sir Joseph Banks regarding the expedition being fitted out under the command of his former Discovery shipmate, Henry Roberts, for discovery in the South Seas. He offered suggestions on the type of vessels that would be suitable and proposed the Queen Charlotte Islands as the best place to form a settlement on the North West Coast.

== Later life and death ==
There was a George Dixon who taught navigation at Gosport, England and wrote a treatise entitled The Navigator's Assistant in 1791. This may or may not be the same George Dixon.

Dixon arrived in Bermuda with his wife, Ann, via New York in February 1794. His intention was to revert to his original training and work as a silversmith/jeweller. This is borne out by an advertisement in The Bermuda Gazette in April 1794 announcing his intentions: "George Dixon, jeweller from London". The Bermuda Gazette soon reported that Dixon's wife Ann, "lately from England", died in childbirth in May 1794: she was buried at St George, Bermuda on 20 May 1794. Dixon was left with his only child, Marianna. He himself died shortly afterwards on 11 November 1795, as confirmed by a notice in the Cumberland Pacquet in February 1796: "[died] November 11 at Bermuda, Capt Dixon, the circumnavigator, a native of Kirkoswald in this county". The orphaned Marianna Dixon married a Bermudian merchant, Charles Bryan Hayward, in 1814.
