= Nathaniel Portlock =

British explorer (c. 1748 – 1817)

Captain Nathaniel Portlock
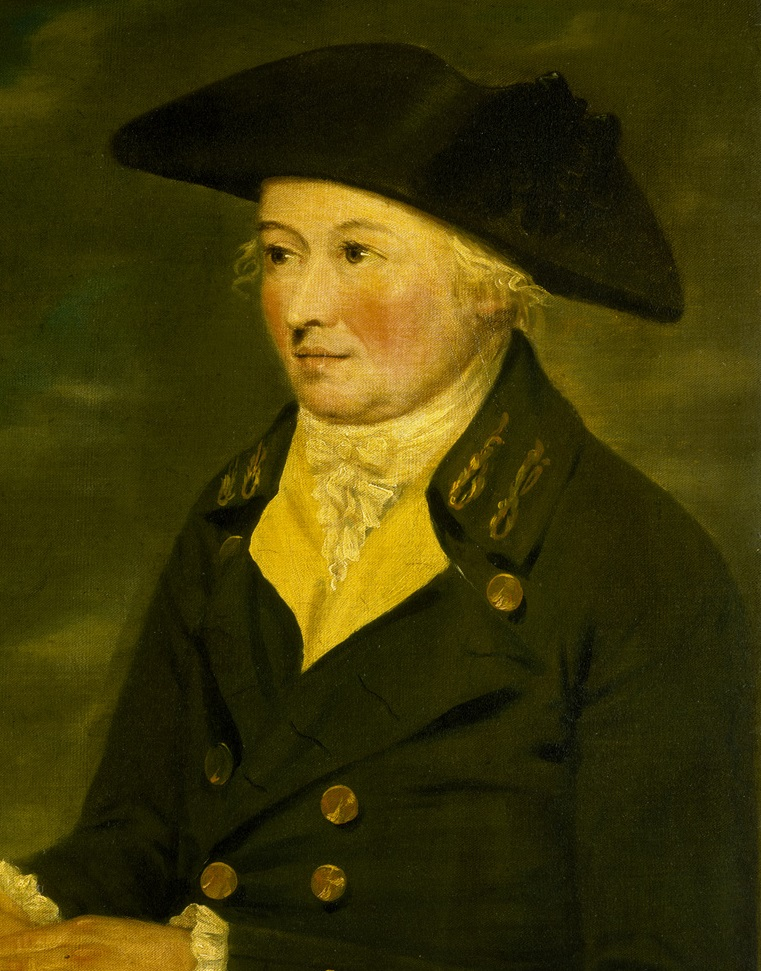
- Nathaniel Portlock
- Born: c. 1749
- Died: 12 September 1817; Greenwich
- Burial place: Greenwich
- Military career
- Branch: Royal Navy
- Rank: Captain

Nathaniel Portlock (c. 1748 – 12 September 1817) was a British ship's captain, maritime fur trader, and author.

== Career ==
He entered the Royal Navy in 1772 as an able seaman, serving in HMS St Albans. In 1776 he joined HMS Discovery as master's mate and served on the third Pacific voyage of James Cook. During the expedition, in August 1779, he was transferred to HMS Resolution.

He passed his lieutenant's examination on 7 September 1780, then served on HMS Firebrand in the Channel fleet.

On Cook's third voyage, furs obtained in present-day British Columbia and Alaska sold for good prices when the expedition called at Macao. In 1785 Richard Cadman Etches and partners, including Portlock and George Dixon formed a partnership, commonly called the King George's Sound Company, to develop the fur trade. Dixon had also served on Resolution in the Pacific Ocean under Cook. In September 1785 Portlock and Dixon sailed from England. Portlock was in command of the larger vessel, the 320-ton (bm) King George, with a crew of 59. Dixon's was in command of the 200-ton (bm) Queen Charlotte, with a crew of 33. Dixon and Portlock sailed together for most of their three-year voyage. They crossed the Atlantic Ocean, reaching the Falkland Islands in January 1786, and transited Cape Horn to enter the Pacific Ocean. They reached the Hawaiian Islands on 24 May and anchored in Kealakekua Bay (where Cook had been killed in 1779), but did not go ashore. They took on fresh food at other Hawaiian Islands and proceeded on to what is now Alaska. After two years of plying the waters, Portlock and Dixon departed North America, reaching Macao in November 1788.

On their return Portlock and Dixon published an account of the voyage, based in part on letters written by William Beresford, the trader on the expedition.

Returning to the Royal Navy in 1791, Portlock was appointed to command the brig HMS Assistant, which accompanied Bligh on his second voyage to transport breadfruit plants from Tahiti to the West Indies. Following his return to England in 1793, Portlock was promoted to commander and later commanded the sloop HMS Arrow. In 1799 he was promoted to captain, and served as a Sea Fencibles commander at Poole in 1803, and at Dartmouth from 1805 to 1807. He died on 12 September 1817 in Greenwich Hospital.

== Personal life ==
His son, Major-General Joseph Ellison Portlock, was a British geologist and soldier.

== Legacy ==
Portlock Harbor, a bay on the west coast of Alaska's Chichagof Island, was named by Portlock in 1789, following a visit there in August 1787. Portlock, a cannery settlement active in the early and middle 20th century, Portlock Glacier and a road east of Homer, all on Alaska's Kenai Peninsula, were named in his honor.

== See also ==
- HMS Lutine — while commanding Arrow, Portlock was involved in the wreck and attempted salvage of Lutine, which sank on 9 October 1799 carrying a large cargo of gold. The Lutine Bell, which was salvaged, was in the past rung when ships were reported sunk at Lloyd's of London.
