= Kealakekua Bay =

Bay and historic place in Hawaii County, Hawaii

- Kealakekua Bay Historic District
- U.S. National Register of Historic Places
- U.S. Historic district
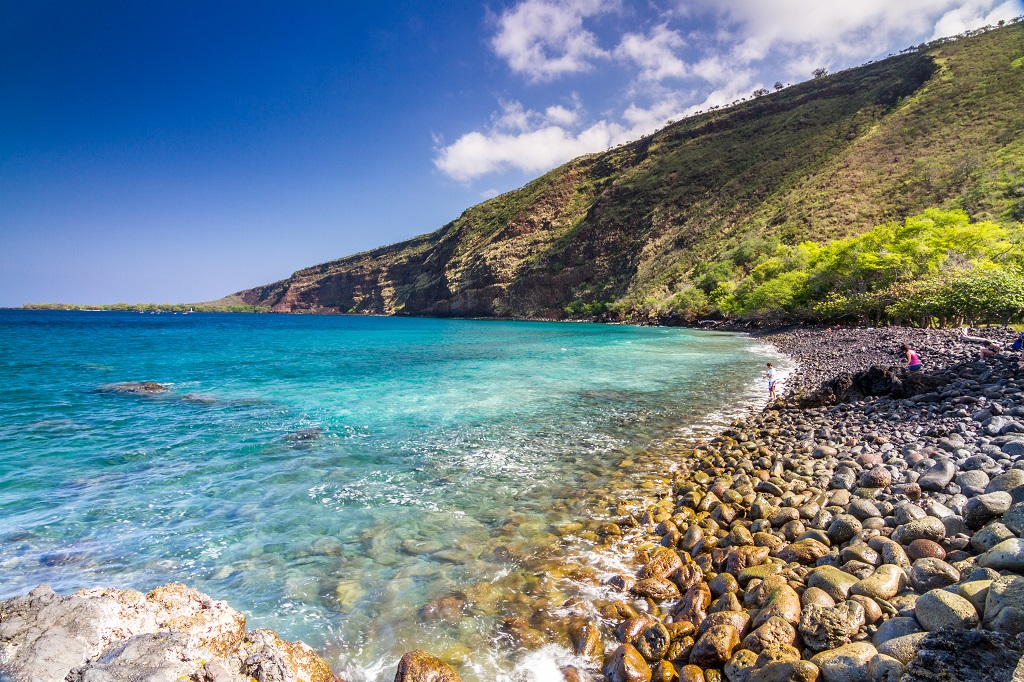
- Kealakekua Bay in the morning

- Location within Hawaii
- Location: Kona District, Hawaii, United States
- Coordinates: 19°28′34″N 155°55′37″W
- Area: 375 acres (152 ha)
- Built: 1500–1749
- Architectural style: Ancient Hawaii
- NRHP reference No.: 73000651
- Added to NRHP: December 12, 1973

Kealakekua Bay is located on the Kona coast of the island of Hawaiʻi about 12 miles (19 km) south of Kailua-Kona. Settled over a thousand years ago, the surrounding area contains many archeological and historical sites such as religious temples (heiaus) and also includes the spot where the first documented European to reach the Hawaiian islands, Captain James Cook, was killed. It was listed in the National Register of Historic Places listings on the island of Hawaiʻi in 1973 as the Kealakekua Bay Historical District. The bay is a marine life conservation district, a popular destination for kayaking, scuba diving, and snorkeling.

== History ==
=== Ancient history ===
Settlement on Kealakekua Bay has a long history. Hikiau Heiau is a luakini temple of Ancient Hawaii located at the south end of the bay, at coordinates 19°28′31″N 155°55′9″W. Cook recorded the large platform being about 16 feet (4.9 m) high, 250 feet (76 m) long, and 100 feet (30 m) wide. The sheer cliff face called Ka-pali-poko—a-Manuahi overlooking the bay houses burials of Hawaiian royalty and their accompanied companions and funerary items. The northwestern part of the cliff is called Ka-pali-kapu-o-Keoua. The name means "sacred cliffs of Keōua" in honor of Keōua Nui. He was sometimes known as the "father of kings" since many rulers were his descendants. The difficulty in accessing the cliff kept the exact burial places secret.

The village of Kaʻawaloa was at the north end of the bay in ancient times, where the Puhina O Lono Heiau was built, along with some royal residences. The name of the village means "the distant Kava", from the medicinal plant used in religious rituals. The name of the bay comes from ke ala ke kua in the Hawaiian language which means "the god's pathway". This area was the focus of extensive Makahiki celebrations.

=== Captain Cook and Kalaniʻōpuʻu ===
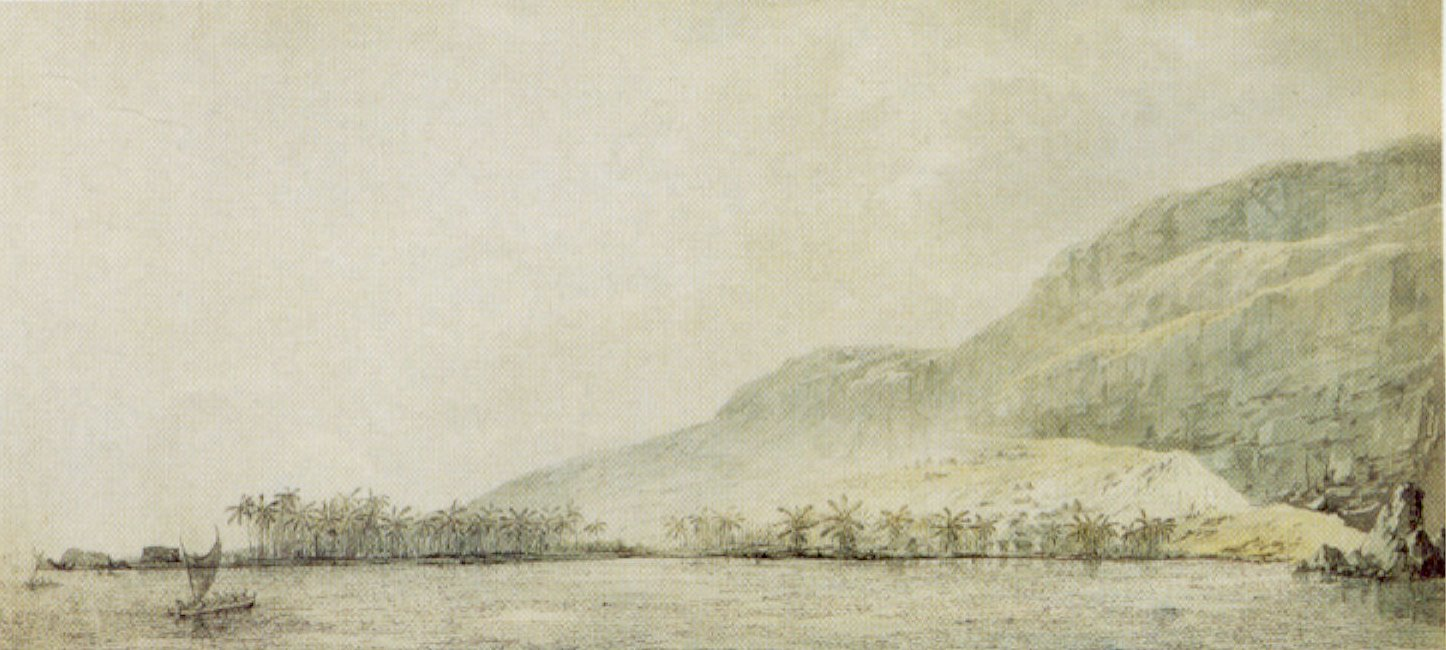
Kaʻawaloa in 1779 by John Webber, artist aboard Cook's ship

Although there are theories that Spanish or Dutch sailors might have stopped here much earlier, the first documented European to arrive was Captain James Cook. He and his crews on the Resolution and Discovery sighted Kealakekua Bay on the morning of January 17, 1779. He estimated several thousand people lived in the two villages, and many thousand more in the surrounding areas. On January 28, he performed the first Christian service on the islands, for the funeral of a crew member who had died.

Cook had entered the bay during Makahiki, a traditionally peaceful time. Cook and his men were welcomed, given much food and gifts from the island and treated as honored guests. John Ledyard, the only American on board Cook's third voyage, gives a detailed account of these events in his journals. Cook and his crew stayed for several weeks, returning to sea shortly after the end of the festival. After suffering damage to the mast during a storm, the ships returned two weeks later on February 12. This time, already fraying relations came to a head.

One of Cook's captains correctly accused a native chieftain of stealing the Resolution's jolly boat. Cook himself attempted to barter for the wood used to border the natives' "Morai" (a sacred burial ground for certain high-ranking individuals). The native chiefs were mortified at this offer and refused to accept it. Cook later took the wood anyway. With a damaged mast, fraying relations with the natives and being heavily outnumbered, Cook attempted to lure Hawaiian chief Kalaniʻōpuʻu aboard his ship to hold him hostage. Tensions mounted as Cook attempted to trick the chief, and natives surrounded the beach. It evolved to attacks on both sides. As Cook and his men attempted to retreat, Cook was stabbed through the chest by a native chief with an iron dagger which had been traded from Cook's own ship previously in the same visit. Most of Cook's body was never recovered. Cook's men felt they could not leave without resupplying fresh water and further repair of their damaged mast, and subsequent skirmishing resulted in dozens of native deaths by musket fire and the ship's cannons; a portion of Kireekakooa, one of the towns in the bay, was also burned. Cook's death has been depicted in a series of paintings called Death of Cook.

=== Turmoil ===
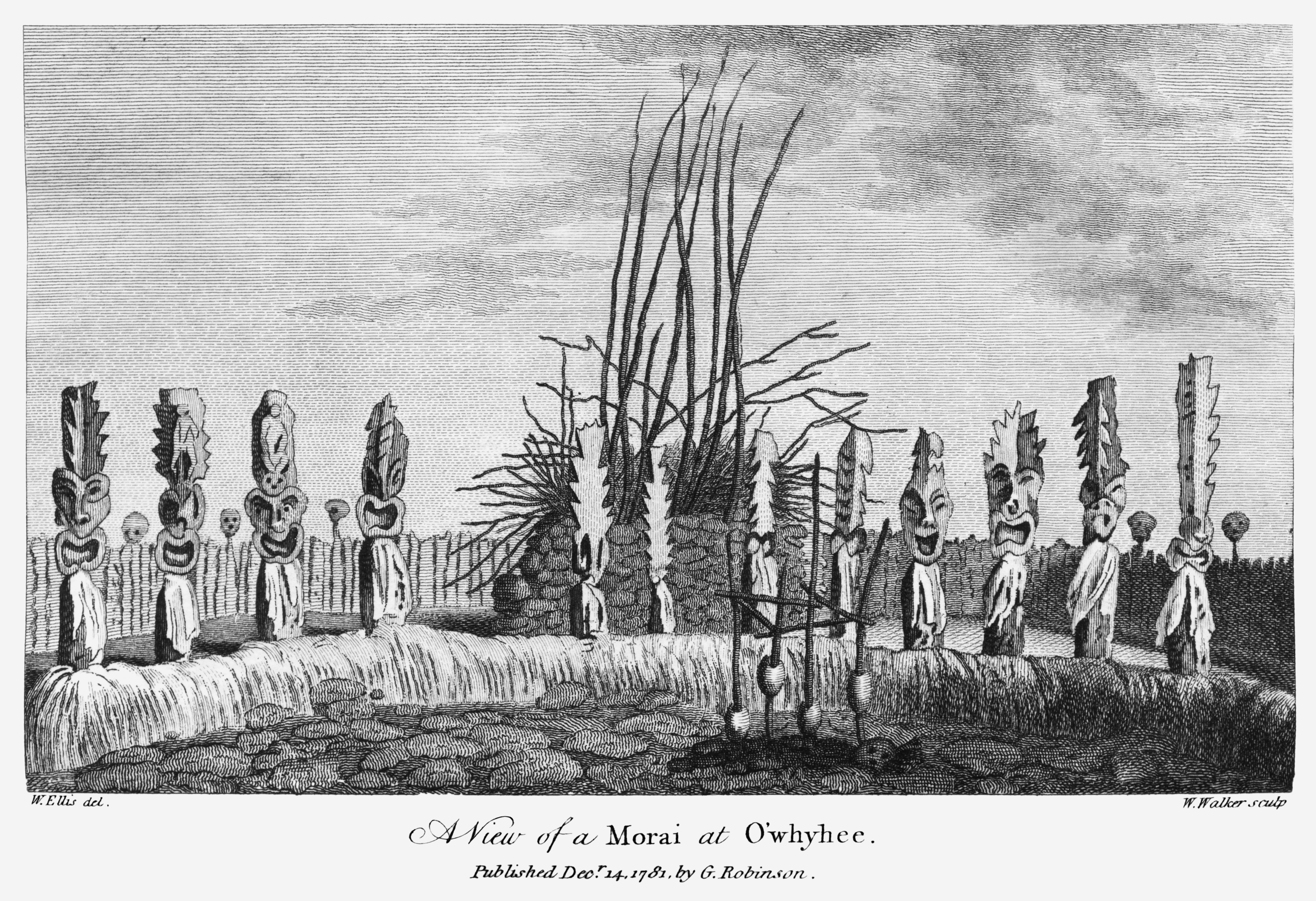
An illustration of the Hikiau heiau at Kealakekua Bay, by William Ellis

When Kalaniʻōpuʻu died in 1782, his oldest son Kīwalaʻō officially inherited the kingdom, but his nephew Kamehameha I became guardian of the god Kūkaʻilimoku. A younger son, Keōua Kuahuʻula, was not happy about this and provoked Kamehameha. Their forces met just south of the bay at the battle of Mokuʻōhai. Kamehameha won control of the west and north sides of the island, but Keōua escaped. It would take over a decade to consolidate Kamehameha's control.

In 1786, merchant ships of the King George's Sound Company under command of the maritime fur traders Nathaniel Portlock and Captain George Dixon anchored in the harbor, but avoided coming ashore. They had been on Cook's voyage when he was killed by natives. In December 1788, the Iphigenia under William Douglas arrived with Chief Kaʻiana, who had already traveled to China.

The first American ship was probably the Lady Washington around this time under Captain John Kendrick. Two sailors, Parson Howel and James Boyd, left the ship (in 1790 or when it returned in 1793) and lived on the island.

In March 1790, the American ship Eleanora arrived at Kealakekua Bay and sent a British sailor ashore named John Young, to determine whether the sister ship, the schooner Fair American, had arrived for its planned rendezvous. Young was detained by Kamehameha's men to prevent the Eleanora's Captain Simon Metcalfe from hearing the news of the destruction of the Fair American, and the death of Metcalfe's son, Thomas Humphrey Metcalfe, after the massacre at Olowalu. Young and Isaac Davis, the lone survivor of the Fair American, slowly adjusted to the island lifestyle. They instructed Hawaiians in the use of the captured cannon and muskets, becoming respected advisers to Kamehameha. In 1791 Spanish explorer Manuel Quimper visited on the ship Princess Royal.

=== More visitors ===
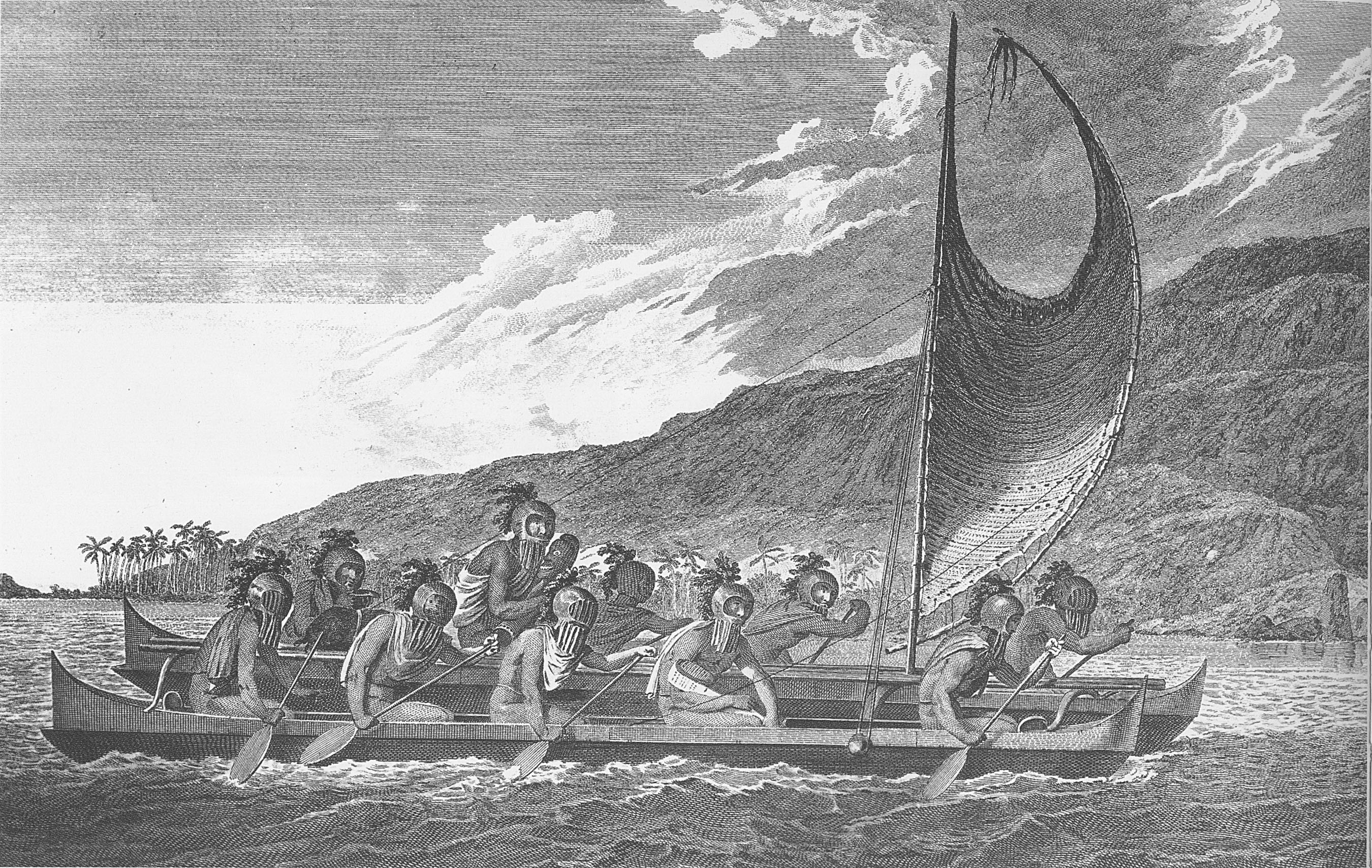
Priests traveling across the bay for first contact rituals, by John Webber

George Vancouver arrived in March 1792 to winter in the islands with a small fleet of British ships. He had been a young midshipman on Cook's fatal voyage 13 years earlier and commanded the party that attempted to recover Cook's remains. He avoided anchoring in Kealakekua Bay, but met some men in canoes who were interested in trading. The common request was for firearms, which Vancouver resisted. One included chief Kaʻiana, who would later turn against Kamehameha.

Vancouver suspected Kaʻiana intended to seize his ships, so left him behind and headed up the coast. There he was surprised to encounter a Hawaiian who in broken English introduced himself as "Jack", and told of traveling to America on a fur-trading ship. Through him, Vancouver met Keʻeaumoku Pāpaʻiahiahi, who gave him a favorable impression of Kamehameha (his son-in-law). He spent the rest of the winter in Oʻahu.

Vancouver returned in February 1793; this time he picked up Keʻeaumoku and anchored in Kealakekua Bay. When Kamehameha came to greet the ship, he brought John Young, now fluent in the Hawaiian language, as an interpreter. This greatly helped to develop a trusted trading relationship. The Hawaiians presented a war game, which was often part of the Makahiki celebration. Impressed by the warriors' abilities, Vancouver fired off some fireworks at night to demonstrate his military technology. Vancouver presented some cattle which he had picked up in California. They were weak and barely alive, so he convinced Kamehameha to avoid killing them for ten years.

Scottish doctor James Lind had recommended the use of citrus juice to prevent scurvy on long voyages. The botanist Archibald Menzies had picked up some citrus fruit seeds in South Africa, and dropped them off here, so that future ships might be able to replenish their stocks at the Hawaiian islands.

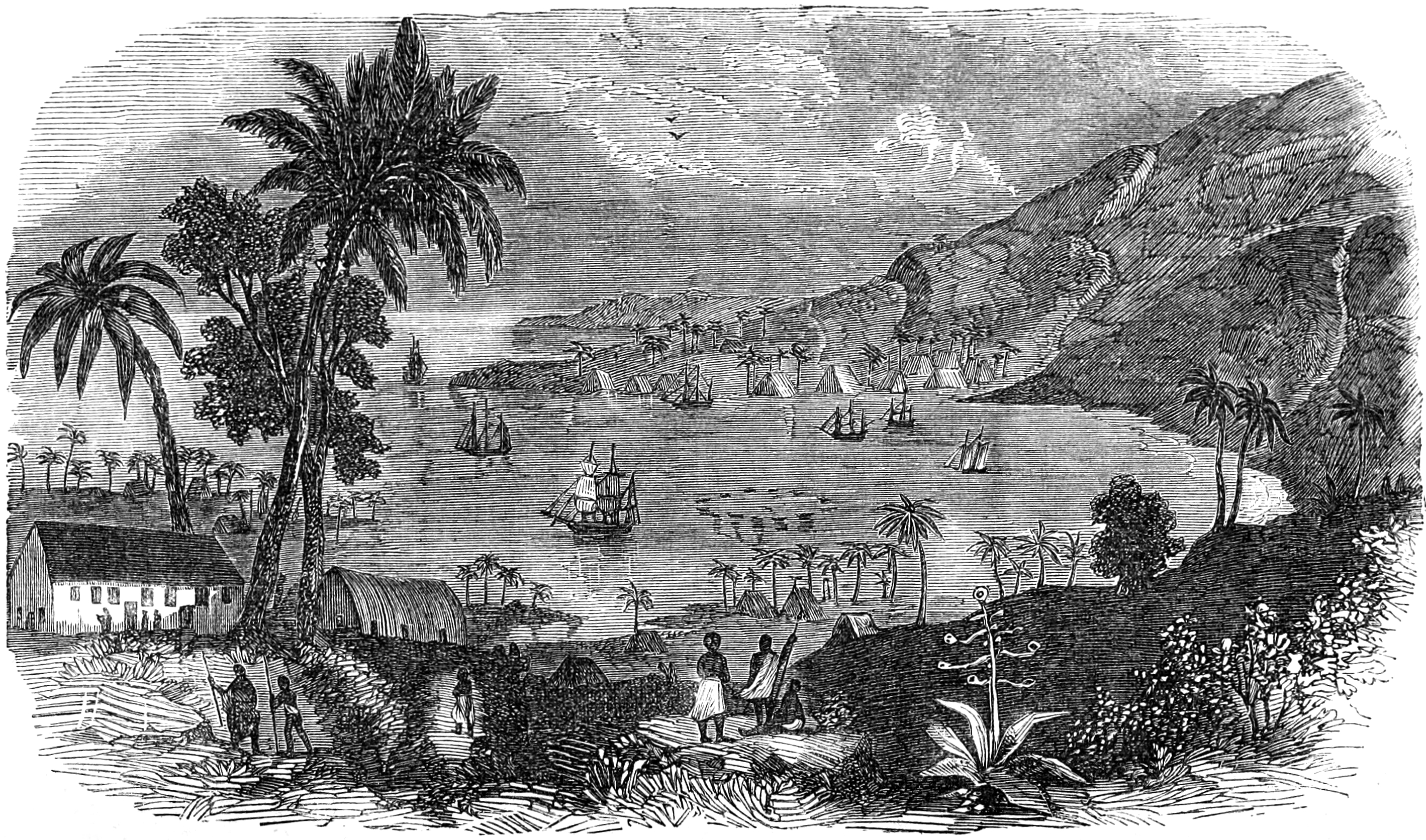
Ships in the bay (sketch by Rufus Anderson)

Vancouver left in March 1793 after visiting the other islands to continue his expedition, and returned again January 13, 1794. He still hoped to broker a truce between Kamehameha and the other islands. His first step was to reconcile Kamehameha with Queen Kaʻahumanu. He dropped off more cattle and sheep from California, and discovered a cow left the year before had delivered a calf. The cattle became feral and eventually became pests. They were not controlled until the "Hawaiian cowboys", known as the paniolo, were recruited.

The ship's carpenters instructed the Hawaiians and the British advisers how to build a 36-foot (11 m) European-style ship, which they named the Britania. On February 25, 1794, Vancouver gathered leaders from around the island onto his ship and negotiated a treaty. Although it is sometimes supposed that this treaty "ceded" Hawaii to Great Britain, the British parliament never acted upon it.

=== Decline ===
For the next few years, Kamehameha was engaged in his war campaigns, and then spent his last years at Kamakahonu to the north. By this time other harbors such as Lahaina and Honolulu became popular with visiting ships. By 1804, the heiau was falling into disuse. In 1814, a British ship HMS Forester arrived in the midst of a mutiny. Otto von Kotzebue arrived in 1816 on a mission from the Russian Empire.

When Kamehameha I died in 1819, his oldest son Liholiho officially inherited the kingdom, calling himself Kamehameha II. His nephew Keaoua Kekuaokalani inherited the important military and religious post of guardian of Kūkaʻilimoku. However, true power was held by Kamehameha's widow Queen Kaʻahumanu. She had been convinced by Vancouver and other visitors that the European customs should be adopted. In the ʻAi Noa she declared an end to the old kapu system.

Kekuaokalani was outraged by this threat to the old traditions, which still were respected by most common people. He gathered religious supporters at Kaʻawaloa, threatening to take the kingdom by force, as happened 37 years earlier. After a failed attempt to negotiate peace, he marched his army north to meet Kalanimoku's troops who were gathered at Kamakahonu. They met in the Battle of Kuamoʻo. Both sides had muskets, but Kalanimoku had cannon mounted on double-hulled canoes. He devastated the fighters for the old religion, who still lie buried in the lava rock.

The wood Kiʻi carvings were burned, and the temples fell into disrepair. A small Christian church was built in 1824 in Kaʻawaloa by the Hawaiian missionaries, and the narrow trail widened to a donkey cart road in the late 1820s, but the population declined due largely to introduced diseases and people shifted to other areas.

In 1825, Admiral Lord Byron (cousin of the famous poet) on the ship HMS Blonde erected a monument to Cook and took away many of the old, sacred artifacts. The last royalty known to live here was high chief Naihe, known as the "national orator," and his wife Chiefess Kapiʻolani, early converts to Christianity. In 1829, she was saddened to see that the destruction of the temples included desecrating the bones of her ancestors at the Puʻuhonua o Hōnaunau. She removed the remains of the old chiefs and hid them in the Pali Kapu O Keōua cliffs before ordering this last temple to be destroyed. The bones were later moved to the Royal Mausoleum of Hawaii in 1858, under direction of King Kamehameha IV.

In 1839 a massive stone church was built just south of the bay. It fell into ruin, and a smaller building called Kahikolu Church was built in 1852. This also fell into ruin, but has been rebuilt. In 1894 a wharf was constructed at the village at the south of the bay, now called Napoʻopoʻo. A steamer landed in the early 20th century when Kona coffee became a popular crop in the upland areas.

A large white stone monument was built on the north shore of the bay in 1874 on the order of Archibald Cleghorn and was deeded to the United Kingdom in 1877. The chain around the monument is supported by four cannon from the ship HMS Fantome; they were placed with their breaches embedded in the rock in 1876. It marks the approximate location of Cook's death. It is located at coordinates 19°28′52.7″N 155°56′0.4″W.

The Cook monument is unreachable by road; this remote location is accessible only by water or an hour-long hike along a moderately steep trail. Many visitors have rented kayaks and paddled across the bay, about 1.5 miles (2.4 km) from its southern end. State conservation regulations prohibit kayaks, stand-up paddleboards, surfboards, and bodyboards from entering the bay unless part of a tour with a licensed local operator. The pier at Napoʻopoʻo can be accessed down a narrow road off the Hawaii Belt Road. The beach sand was mostly removed by Hurricane Iniki in 1992. Boat tours are also available, leaving from Honokōhau harbor, Keauhou Bay, and the Kailua pier.

A short single-day eruption of Mauna Loa volcano took place underwater within Kealakekua Bay in 1877, and within a mile of the shoreline; curious onlookers approaching the area in boats reported unusually turbulent water and occasional floating blocks of hardened lava.

Hawaiian spinner dolphins frequent Kealakekua Bay, especially in the morning. The bay serves as a place for them to rest and feed, and as a nursery for mothers and their calves. Due to the calm water conditions, extensive coral reef, and thriving underwater life, Kealakekua Bay offers some of the best snorkeling and diving in Hawaii, especially in the shallow waters adjacent to the monument. The bay is a protected marine environment so visitors can snorkel but no fishing is allowed in this area.

=== Parks ===
About 180 acres (0.73 km^{2}) around the bay was designated the Kealakekua Bay State Historical Park in 1967, and it was added as a Historic District to the National Register of Historic Places in 1973 as site 73000651. The 315 acres (1.27 km^{2}) of the bay itself were declared a Marine Life Conservation District in 1969.

A narrow one-lane road to the south leads to Puʻuhonua o Hōnaunau National Historical Park, which contains more historic sites.

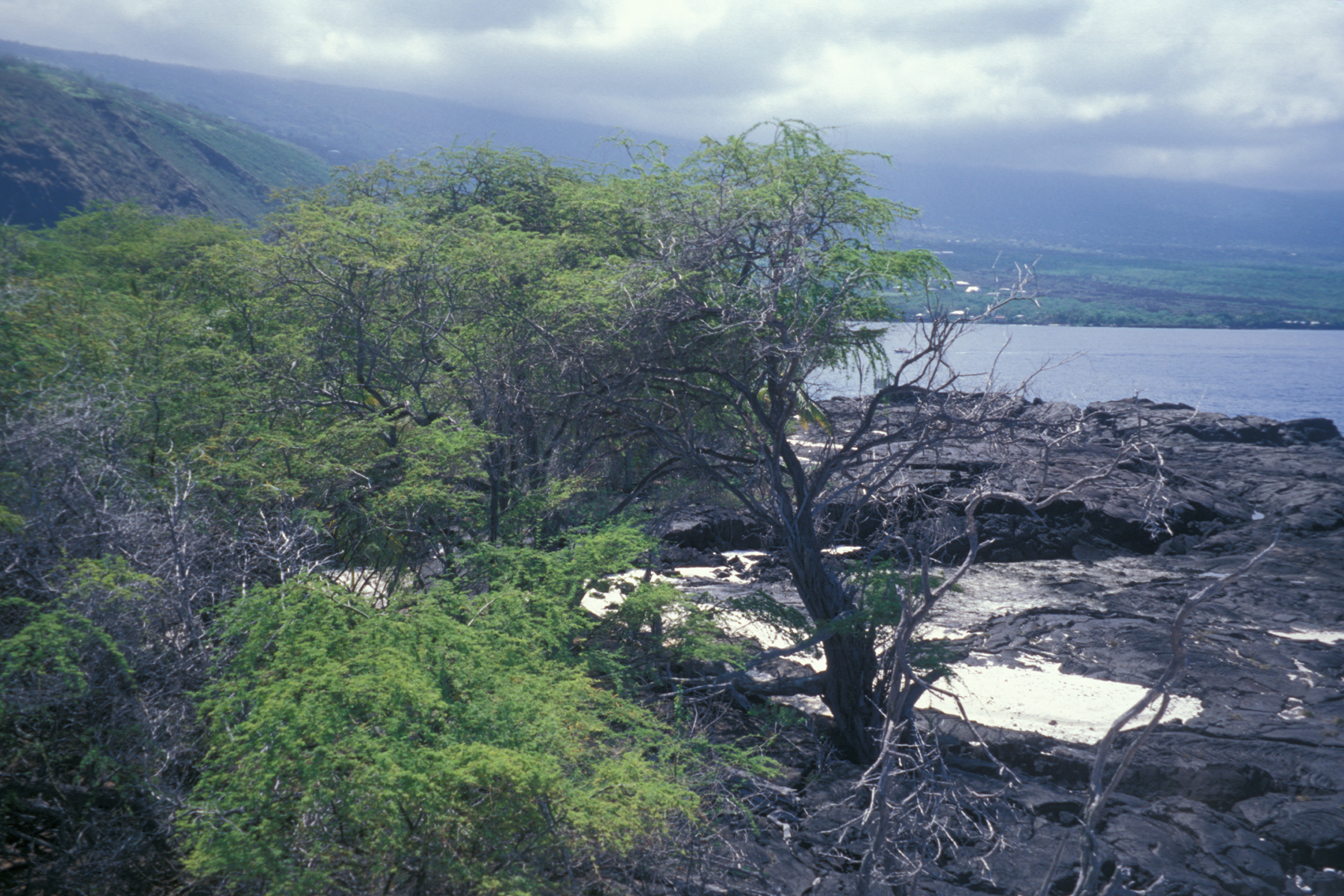
The former village of Kaʻawaloa is now overgrown with Kiawe trees.

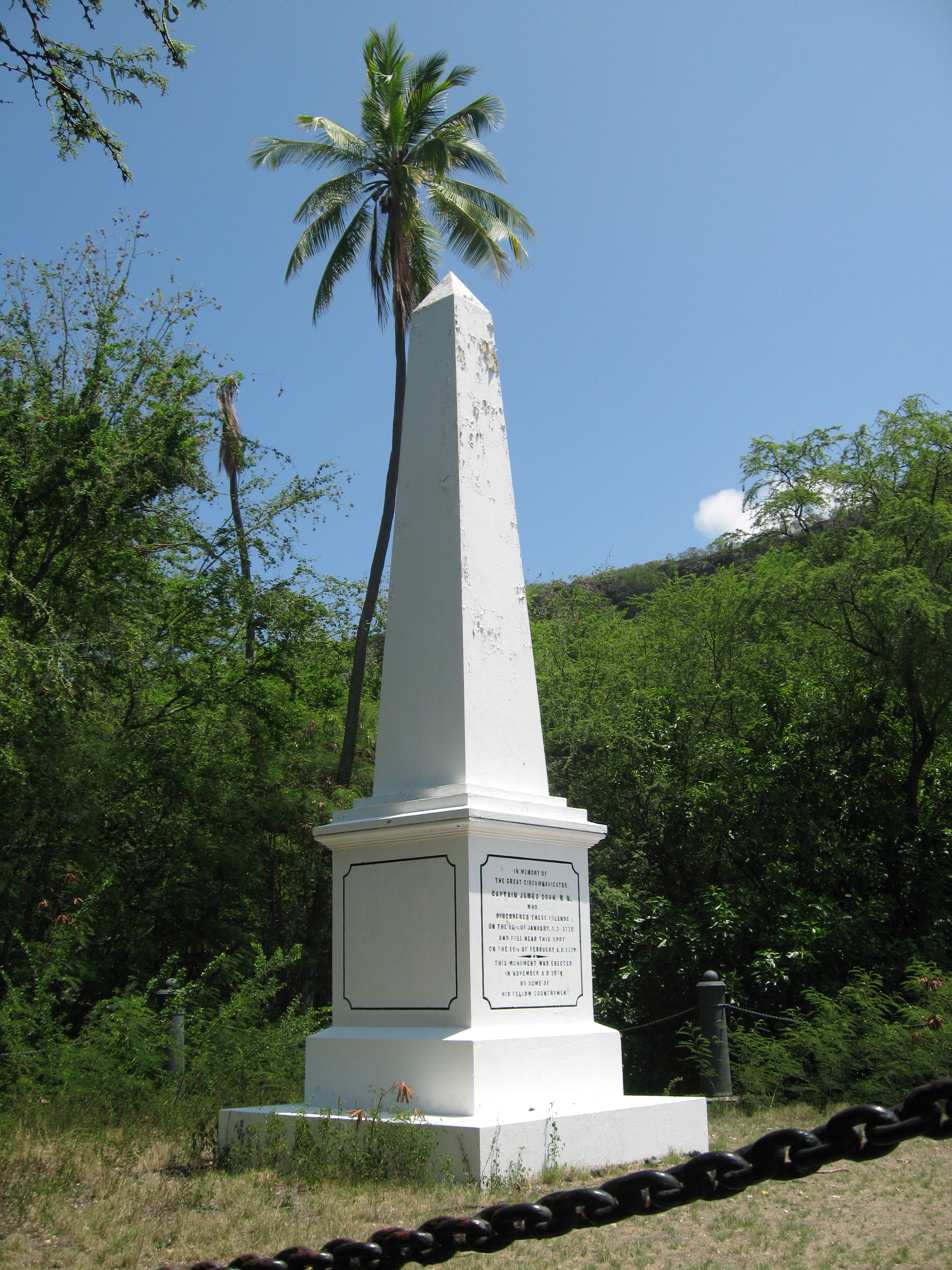
Cook Monument on the northern shore of the bay

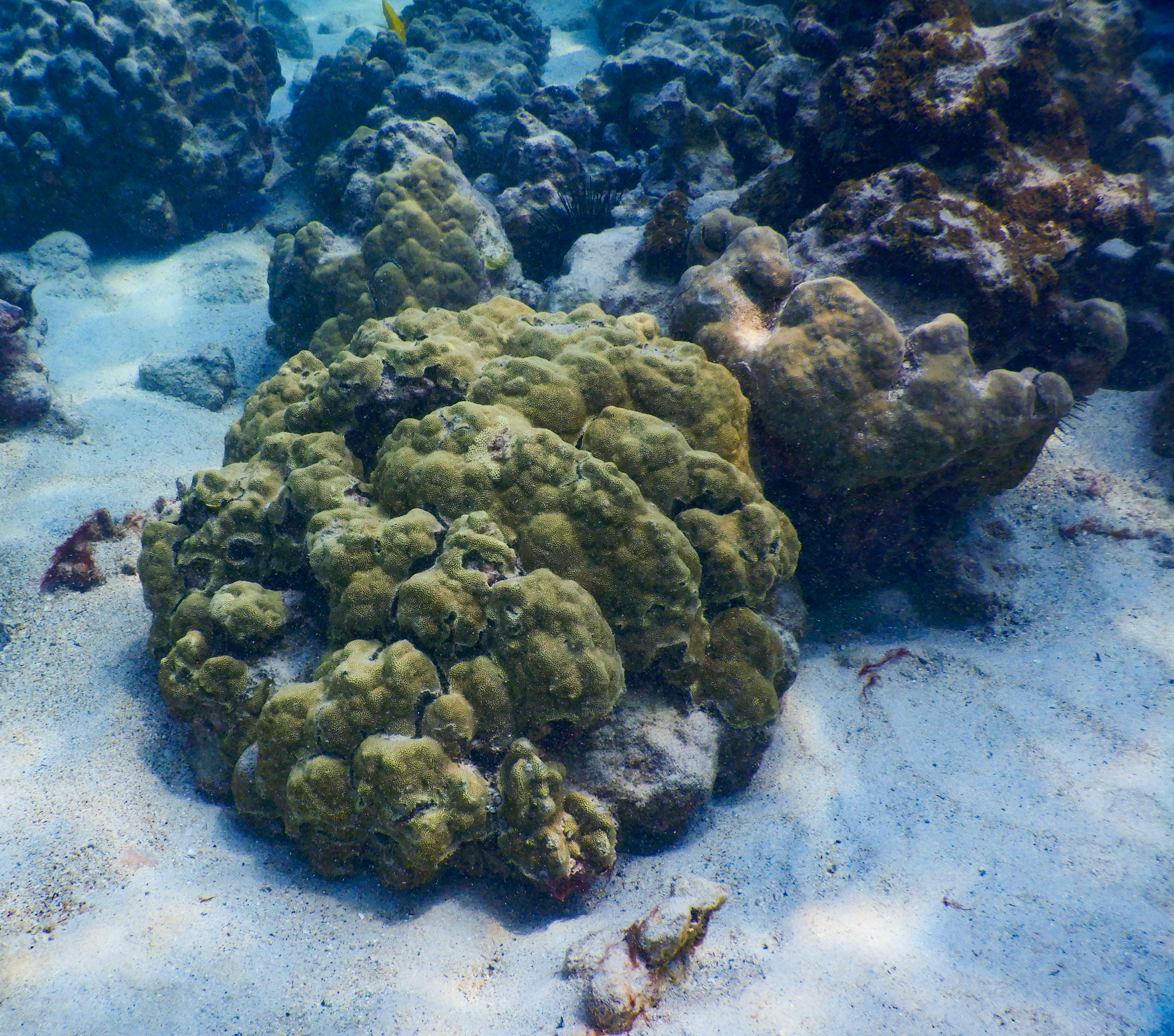
Coral and sand in Kealakekua Bay

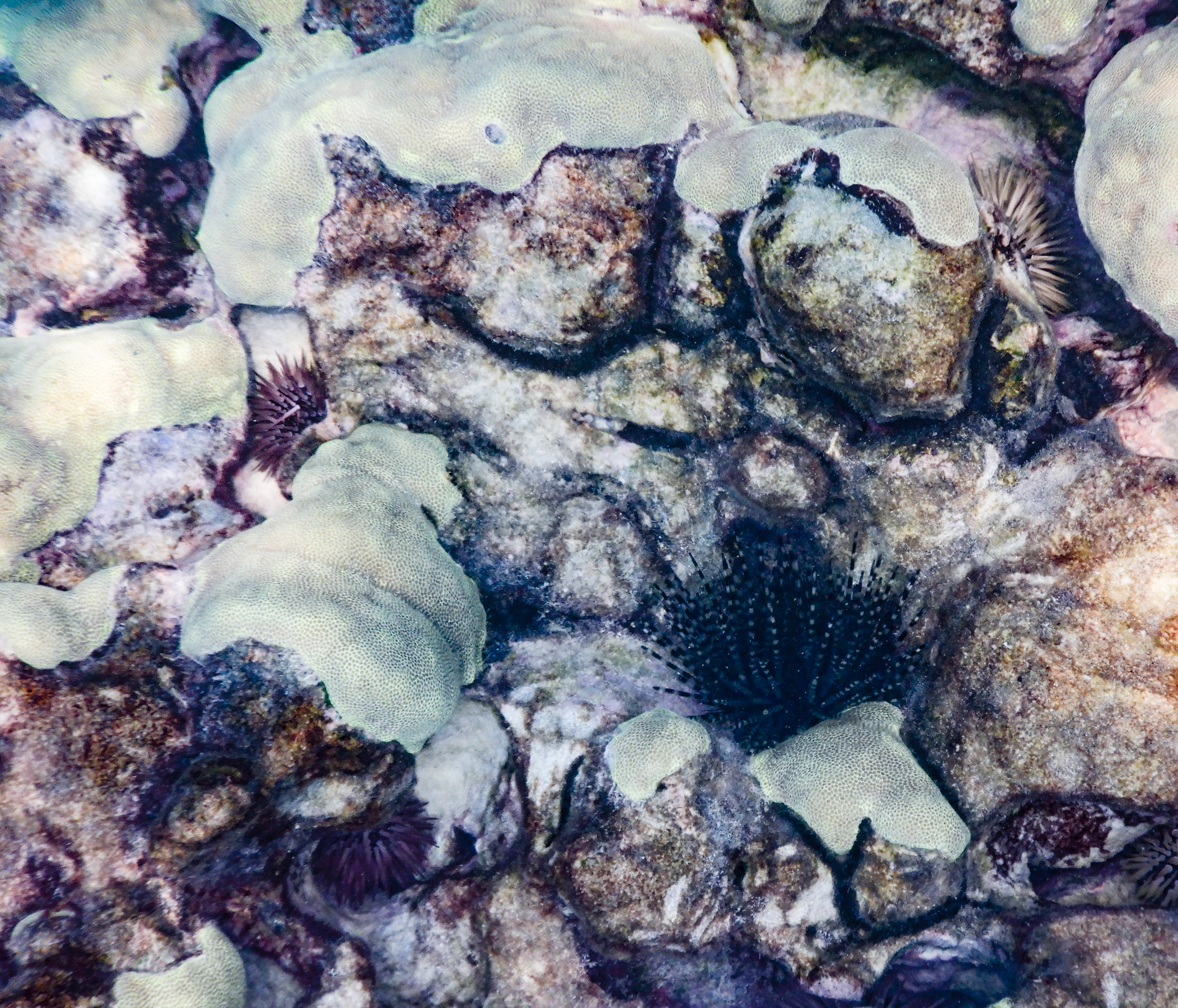
Sea life in Kealakekua Bay

== In popular culture ==
- Mark Twain's Roughing It mentions Kealakekua Bay and the killing of Captain Cook in Chapter 71.
- In Arthur C. Clarke's novel Rendezvous with Rama, Kealakekua Bay is mentioned as a place where Bill Norton, the Commander of the Space Survey Vessel Endeavour, visited.
- The 1933 song "My Little Grass Shack in Kealakekua, Hawaii" mentions the state fish which can be found in the bay: the Humuhumunukunukuapuaʻa (Reef triggerfish).
