= Margaret (1791 ship) =

History

United States
- Name: Margaret
- Namesake: Margaret Magee, wife of Captain James Magee
- Owner: Thomas Handasyd Perkins, Russell Sturgis, James and Thomas Lamb, and James Magee
- Launched: Fall of 1791, Boston
- Fate: Wrecked near Marblehead, Massachusetts, on 7 January 1796

General characteristics
- Tons burthen: 161 (bm)
- Propulsion: Sail
- Sail plan: Full-rigged ship
- Crew: 25
- Armament: 8 cannon; 6–8 swivel guns

Margaret was an American ship built at Boston and launched in the fall of 1791. It was built for use in the maritime fur trade and was owned by Thomas Handasyd Perkins, Russell Sturgis, James and Thomas Lamb, and James Magee. It was armed with eight cannon and six to eight swivel guns. On its maiden voyage it left Boston with a crew of 25.

James Magee and Thomas Handasyd Perkins were inspired to build the Margaret and invest in the maritime fur trade after meeting Robert Gray of the Columbia Rediviva, and possibly John Kendrick of the Lady Washington, in Guangzhou (Canton) and Macau in the 1789–1790 winter. In addition to building the Margaret, Magee and Perkins also financed the voyage of the Hope, under Joseph Ingraham.

The Margaret was built at Boston, launched in the fall of 1791, and set out on its maiden voyage shortly after. James Magee was the captain and David Lamb first mate. Otis Liscombe was second mate and Stephen Hills third mate. The crew included the "historian" Jonathan Howell who, with Magee, collected many artifacts from the Pacific Northwest Coast and the Hawaiian Islands for the Massachusetts Historical Society.

On 24 October 1791 the Margaret sailed from Boston to the Pacific Northwest coast via Cape Horn, arriving at Houston Stewart Channel in Haida Gwaii in April 1792. James Magee had fallen ill and the first mate, David Lamb, was in command. In May, still at Haida Gwaii, the Margaret encountered the Columbia Rediviva, under captain Robert Gray. Like other traders at the time, Magee found the trade goods he had brought were no longer much desired by the indigenous peoples of the Pacific Northwest Coast. In May 1792 he wrote in the ship's log: "The Articles of Trade we mostly made up of in this place were Muskets, Copper, some Cloathing, a new Iron Necklaces, but any of Iron mechanical Tools they were not fond of except files, which they were very fond of but to our disadvantage we had none."

Robert Haswell, of the Columbia Rediviva wrote that the Margaret was "as fine a vessel as ever I saw of her size, and appeared exceeding well fitted for the voyage and I believe there was no expense spared." The Margaret and Columbia met again on 3 July 1792 near the southern end of Haida Gwaii. The two ships sailed together down the coast of Vancouver Island to Clayoquot Sound. The leader of the Tla-o-qui-aht Nuu-chah-nulth of Clayoquot Sound, Chief Wickaninnish, came on board the Margaret. Robert Gray, also on board Margaret, convinced Wickaninnish to visit the Columbia as well. Wickaninnish did, although according to John Boit, "he did not appear happy". Wickaninnish disliked and feared Gray, who had destroyed the village of Opitsaht with cannon fire earlier in that year.

In late July the Margaret sailed to the Columbia River to trade for furs, with little success. Returning north, on 8 August 1792 the Margaret anchored at Yuquot and the Spanish outpost Santa Cruz de Nuca in Nootka Sound, in company with the Hope, under Joseph Ingraham. On learning of Captain Magee's illness, Juan Francisco de la Bodega y Quadra, the commandant of Santa Cruz de Nuca, offered him a residence on shore. On 12 August the Margaret, under David Lamb, sailed in company with the Hope to search for fur trading opportunities. Magee remained at Santa Cruz de Nuca. When George Vancouver arrived at Nootka Sound on 28 August and noted that Captain Magee was living on shore with his surgeon and John Howell. While at Santa Cruz de Nuca, James Magee, John Howell, and several others, served as witnesses to an official statement made by the Mowachaht Nuu-chah-nulth Chief Maquinna to Bodega y Quadra, having to do with the Nootka Crisis and the claims of John Meares. In addition, Captain Magee sent Vancouver a complaint, saying that the British captains William Brown of the Butterworth and James Baker of the Jenny had fired upon the natives in Clayoquot Sound in August 1792, and should be charged with piracy. Captain Brown of the Butterworth had tried to rob the natives of their furs and, encountering resistance, fired upon them, killing four.

The Margaret, under David Lamb, returned to Nootka Sound on 21 September 1792. The Hope arrived about a week later. During the 1792 season the Margaret had acquired about 1,200 sea otter pelts. Sometime during the season, the Margaret struck a rock in Hecate Strait, southeast of Rose Point, Haida Gwaii. This rock became known as "Margaret Rock". Magee had intended to have the Margaret spend the winter in Nootka Sound, and to build a small schooner to act as a tender for the 1793 season. The furs collected by the Margaret were to be taken to China by the Hope. Instead, some men were left to build the schooner and both the Margaret and Hope sailed together for China, via the Hawaiian Islands. They arrived in Hawaii on 5 November 1792.

On 8 November the Margaret and Hope encountered the Halcyon under Captain Charles Barkley. The three vessels sailed together to Waikiki, Oahu, to procure water. Then they sailed to Kauai, arriving on 11 November. On the 13th the Halcyon left for China. The Margaret did likewise on 21 November, arriving at Macau in early January 1793. While in China David Lamb left the ship. John Howell, the historian also left, having attached himself to Captain John Kendrick of the Lady Washington.

The Margaret left China in late January 1793 and in April arrived on the Pacific Northwest Coast. At Nootka Sound the schooner was finished months before Margaret arrived. Little is known about the schooner. Its name is unknown. It was probably about 30 tons, built by Mr. Smith, the head carpenter, and launched in December 1792. By the time Margaret arrived the schooner had collected upwards of a thousand sea otter skins.

While trading in near Ninstints, Haida Gwaii, Magee found that the Haida "...would not sell them [sea otter furs] for anything but Moose skins which we had none of. These skins the[y] call Clemmons which if we had would command skin for skin." The term "clemmon", also spelled "clammon", "clammel", and other ways, were hides of moose, elk, or sometimes caribou. Among other uses, the Tlingit and Haida used them as a base for armor. Sailing south in the Margaret, Magee obtained a quantity of clemmons at Barkley Sound and the Washington coast. Magee returned north and sold the hides "at the rate of 3 prime [sea otter] skins for the best sort [of clemmon] & 2 for the second".

Between the Margaret and the schooner, over 3,000 sea otter pelts were collected in 1793, a remarkable feat given that there were at least ten competing ships. At the end of the 1793 trading season the Margaret sailed to China via Hawaii, arriving at Oahu in October and Canton in December 1793. The fate of the schooner is unknown. From Canton the Margaret returned to Boston in company with the schooner Jane, belonging to the Dorr family. On 17 August 1794 the Margaret arrived at Boston. Upon return, James Magee presented the Massachusetts Historical Society with an "extract of the log-books and journals" and a large collection of "curiosities", most of which are now in the collection of the Peabody Museum of Archaeology and Ethnology at Harvard University. The voyage of the Margaret was very profitable and inspired many other New Englanders to enter the maritime fur trade.

The original manuscript log of this voyage of the Margaret is lost, but an incomplete transcription survives in at least three copies owned by the Massachusetts Historical Society, the Peabody Essex Museum, and the Nantucket Historical Association. Historians disagree over who wrote the log. James R. Gibson believes it was the second mate, Otis Liscome. Rhys Richards says it was Cornelius Soule.

After returning to Boston in August 1794 the Margaret was registered under new owners in November 1794, again in Boston. On 7 January 1796 the Margaret was wrecked on Gooseberry Rocks, about 2 miles (3.2 km) out from Marblehead, Massachusetts.

== See also ==
- History of the west coast of North America
- List of ships in British Columbia
