= Ruby Beach =

Beach in Washington, United States

- Beach
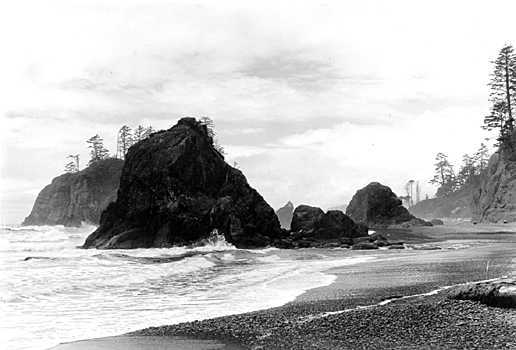
- Ruby Beach, 1936. Photo: George A. Grant

- Location within Washington (state)
- Coordinates: 47°42′39″N 124°24′56″W
- Location: Jefferson County, United States

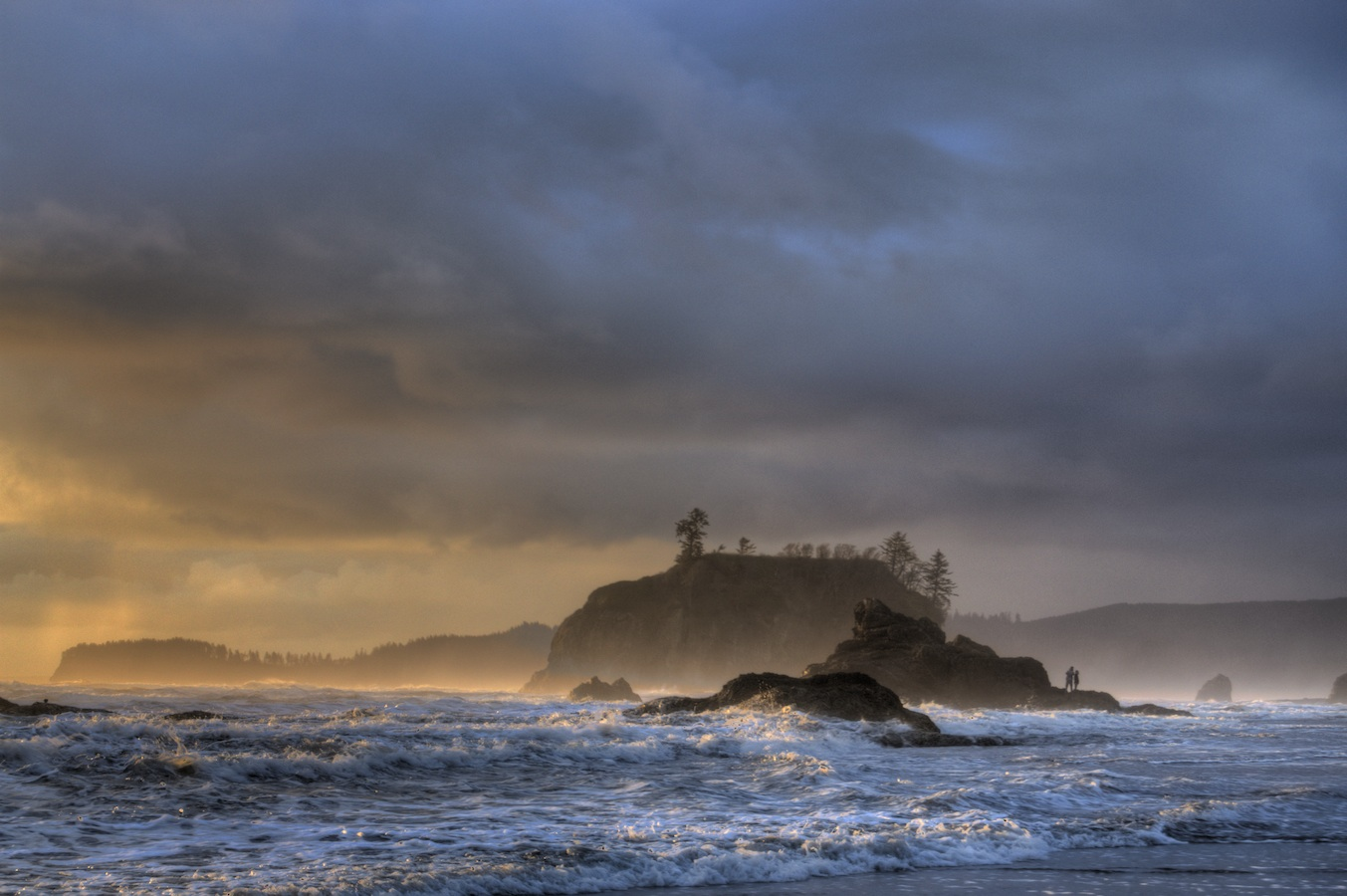
Stormy day at Ruby Beach

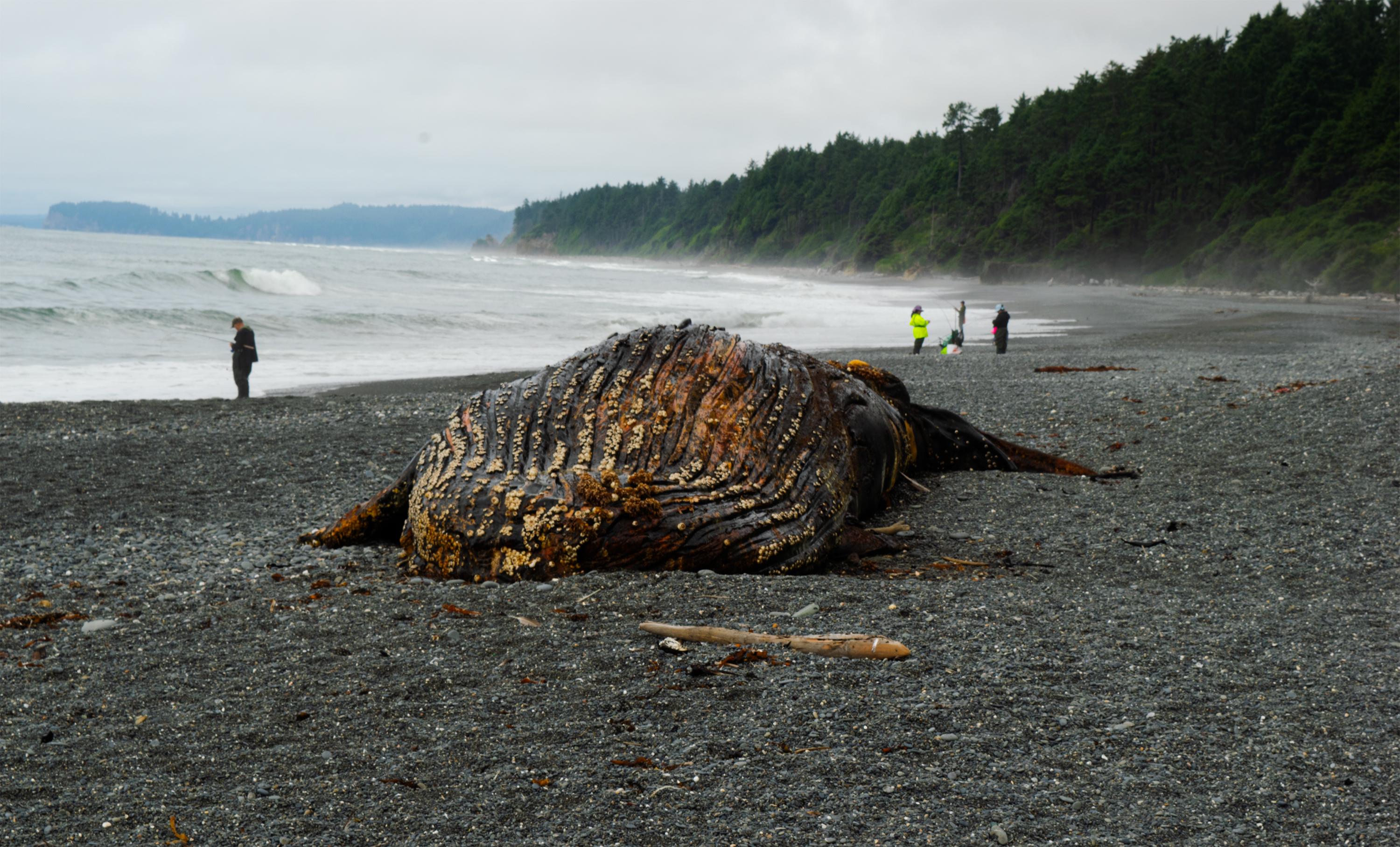
Beached whale

Ruby Beach is the northernmost of the southern beaches in the coastal section of Olympic National Park in the U.S. state of Washington. It is located on Highway 101, in Jefferson County, 27 miles (43 km) south of the town of Forks.

Like virtually all beaches on the northern coast, Ruby Beach has a tremendous amount of driftwood. It is notable for the number of sea stacks there.

The beach is so called because of the ruby-like crystals in the beach sand.

Destruction Island is located about 4 miles southwest off the beach. The island and the Destruction Island Lighthouse can be seen from the beach.

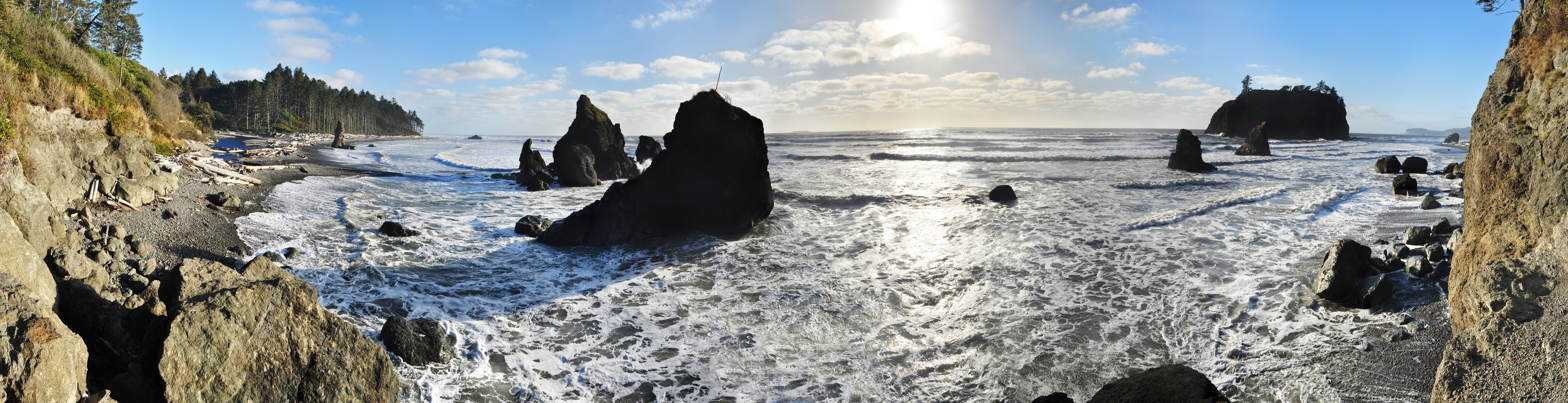
180° panorama from Ruby Beach

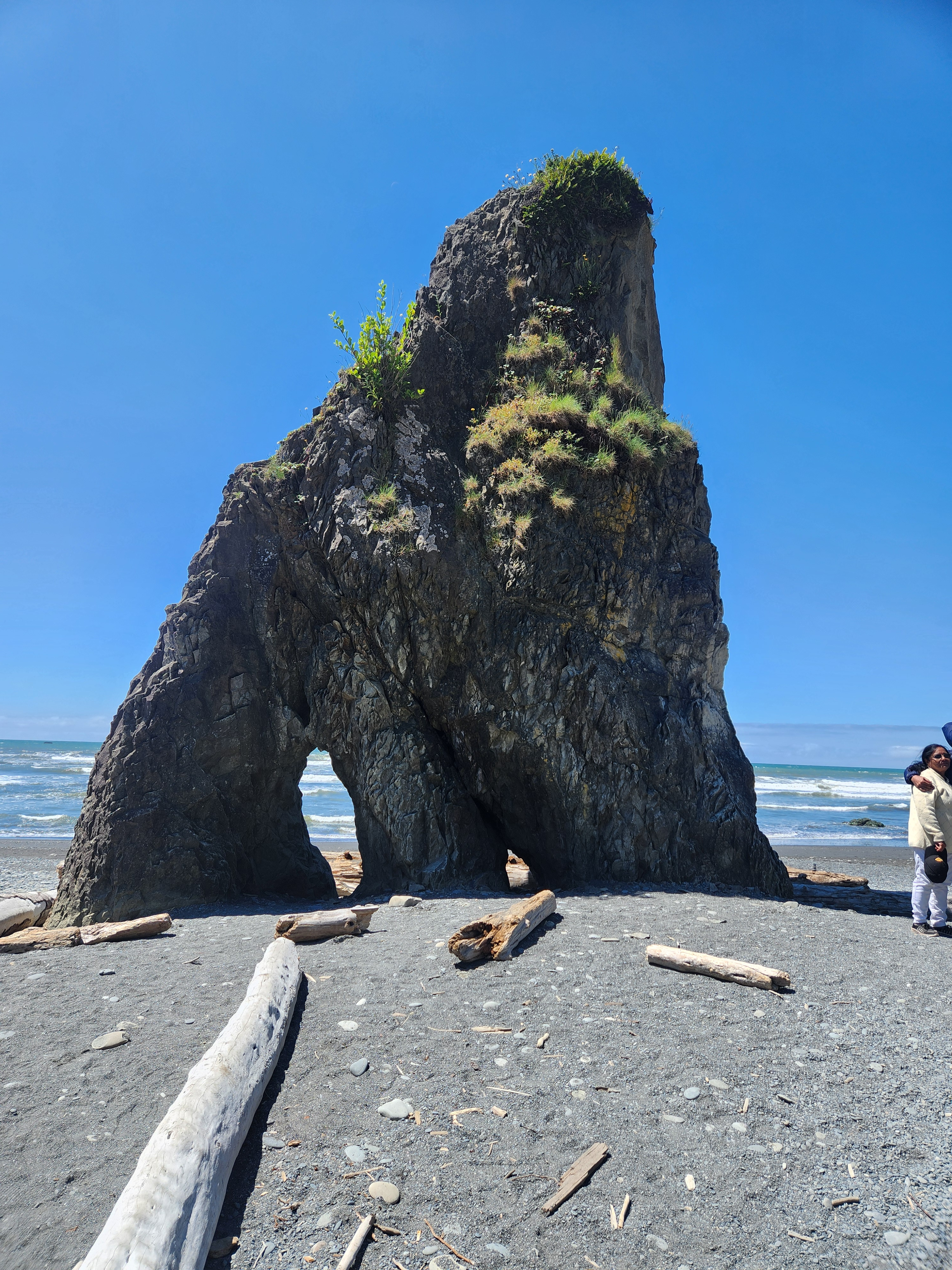
Doorway
