= Wynee =

First Native Hawaiian to travel abroad on a Western ship

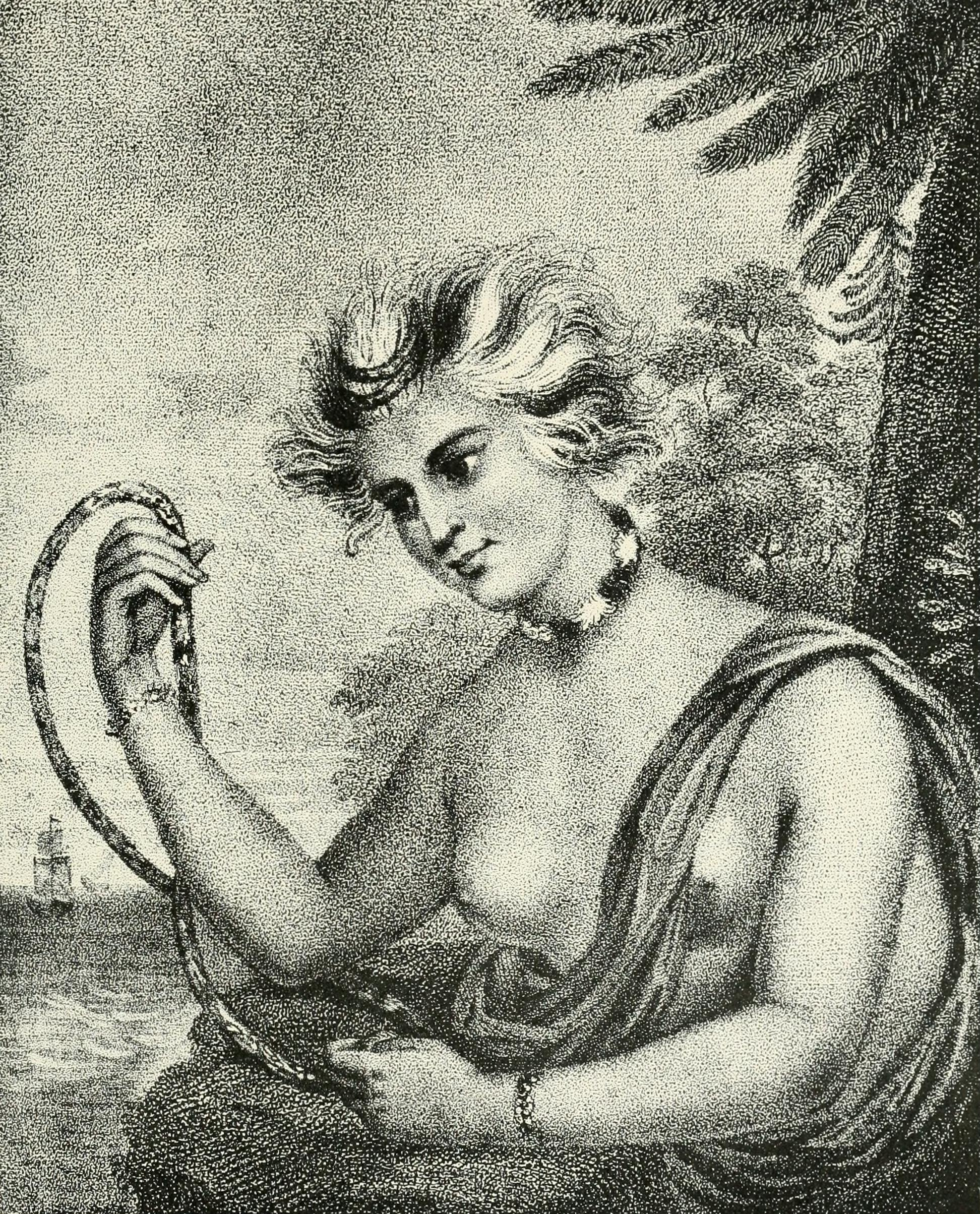
Engraving of Wynee, a Native of Owyhee, one of the Sandwich Islands by a member of John Meares's crew

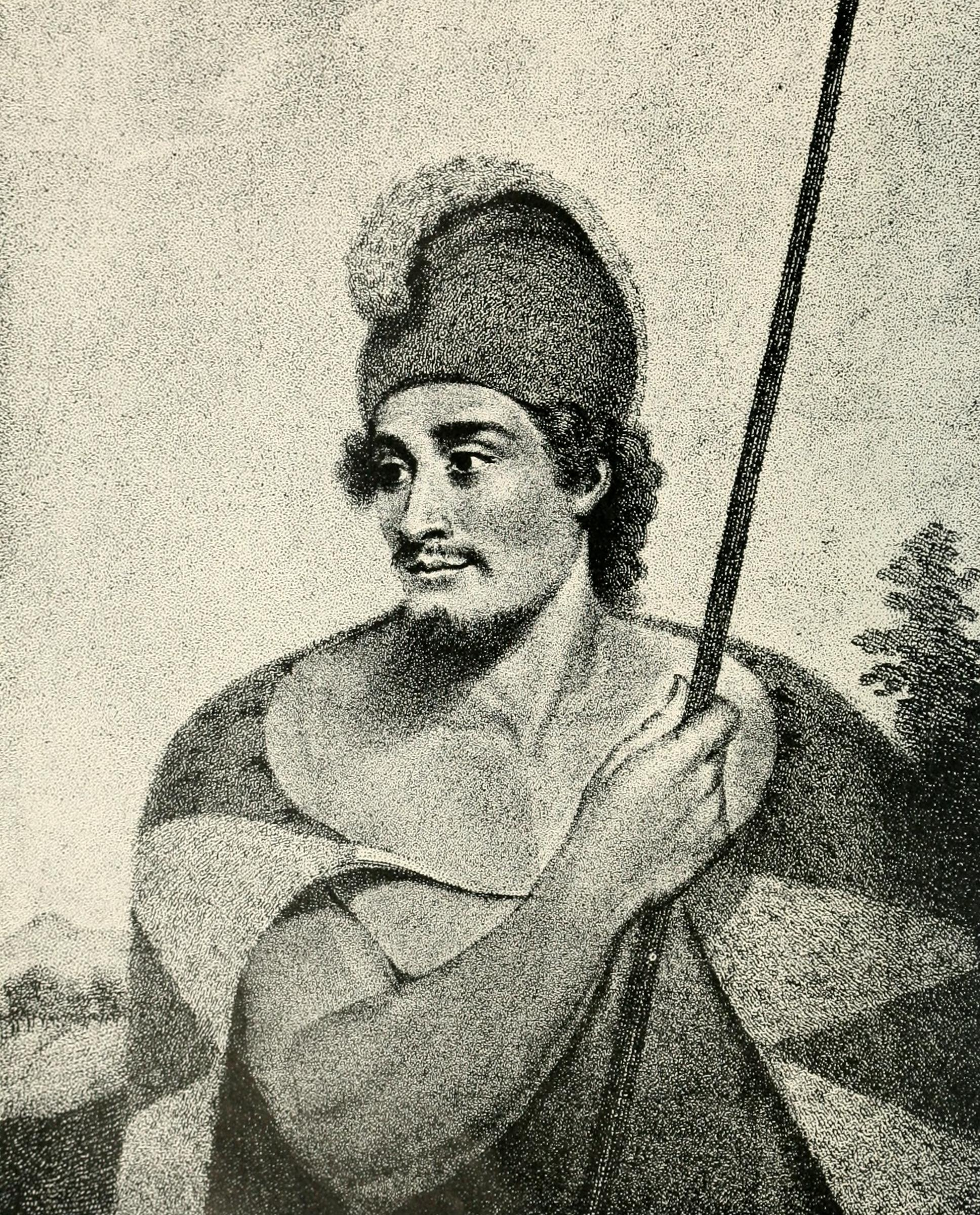
Engraving of Tianna, a Prince of Atooi, who traveled with Wynee during the last leg of her journey home and was beside her at her death

Wynee, also spelled Winee or Winée, was the first Native Hawaiian from the Hawaiian Islands to travel abroad on a Western ship. She traveled to British Columbia and China before dying on the voyage home to Hawaii.

== Biography ==
Wynee was originally from the island of Hawaii, known as Owyhee by European explorers at the time. In 1787, she became the first Native Hawaiian to sail abroad with a Western ship when she was hired as the servant or maid of Frances Hornsby Trevor Barkley, the wife of Captain Charles William Barkley, on the British ship Imperial Eagle. Barkley recorded her name as Wynee which was possibly an attempted spelling of wahine, the Hawaiian word for woman. She traveled to the Pacific Northwest and later to China.

The Barkleys intended to take her back to Europe but Wynee requested to return home and so she was left in the Portuguese colony of Macao. At Canton, she arranged to return to Hawaii aboard Captain John Meares's ship Felice Adventurero with fellow Hawaiian "Tianna" (Kaʻiana – also spelled Tyaana & Tyanna), a member of the aliʻi (high chief) class from the island of Kauai. Traveling with them were two other Hawaiians: a stout man and a boy from Maui but they are not specifically named. She died of illness on the voyage home on February 5, 1788. Tianna, who remained by her bedside caring for her, contracted a fever as well. He reportedly became seriously distraught upon learning of her death, although he would recover and arrive back home. Wynee bequeathed to him some trade articles she had acquired and asked him to deliver her remaining possessions to her father and mother; these items included mirrors, porcelain, Western clothing and other items she collected during her travel. She was buried at sea.

Shortly after describing her last moments, Captain Meares wrote:

Thus died Winee, a native of Owhyhee, one of the Sandwich Islands, who possessed virtues that are seldom to be found in the class of her countrywomen to which she belonged, and a portion of understanding that was not be expected in a rude and uncultivated mind. It may not, perhaps, be uninteresting to mention the cause of this poor girl's departure from her friends and country, which it was her fate never to behold again.

== See also ==
- Omai
- Tupaia (navigator)

== Bibliography ==
- Hill, Beth; Converse, Cathy (2008). The Remarkable World of Frances Barkley: 1769-1845. Victoria, British Columbia: TouchWood Editions. ISBN 978-1-894898-78-2. OCLC 232367548.
- Crossman, Carl L. (1991). The Decorative Arts of the China Trade: Paintings, Furnishings and Exotic Curiosities. Suffolk: Antique Collectors' Club. ISBN 978-1-85149-096-7. OCLC 220943661.
- Day, Arthur Grove (1984). History Makers of Hawaii: a Biographical Dictionary. Honolulu: Mutual Publishing of Honolulu. ISBN 978-0-935180-09-1. OCLC 11087565.
- Meares, John (1790). Voyages Made in the Years 1788 and 1789, from China to the North West Coast of America. London: Printed at the Logographic Press. p. 27. OCLC 2210719.
- Miller, David G. (1988). "Kaʻiana, the Once Famous 'Prince of Kauaʻi'". Hawaiian Journal of History. 22. Honolulu: Hawaiian Historical Society: 1–19. hdl:10524/389. OCLC 60626541.
- Ronck, Ronn (1995). Firsts and Almost Firsts in Hawaiʻi. Honolulu: University of Hawaii Press. ISBN 978-0-8248-1282-9. OCLC 32894100.
