= James Magee (sea captain) =

Irish-American fur trader, sea captain and businessman

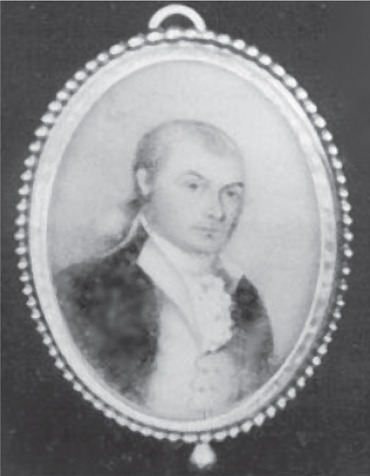
- Born: 1750; County Down
- Died: 2 February 1801; Roxbury
- Children: Augustus Magee

James Magee (1750–1801) was one of the first Americans involved in the Old China Trade and the Maritime Fur Trade. He was born in County Down, Ireland, probably near Downpatrick. James and his brother Bernard immigrated to New England shortly before the American Revolutionary War Described as a "convivial, noble–hearted Irishman", he married Margaret Elliot, sister of Thomas Handasyd Perkins (T.H. Perkins), in October 1783. Magee lived in Roxbury, today part of Boston, ultimately in the Shirley–Eustis House, which he bought in 1798. His brother, Bernard Magee, was also a sea captain in the maritime fur trade. James Magee had three sons: James Magee Jr., Charles Eliott Magee and Augustus Magee. Augustus Magee led the 1812-13 Gutierrez-Magee Expedition, a filibuster in Spanish Texas that briefly liberated that province during the Mexican War of Independence.

== American Revolution ==
During the American Revolutionary War James Magee commanded several ships. First, in 1777, the privateer Independence, which was captured and brought into Boston Harbor by the British ship Countess. In 1778 he briefly commanded the brigantine Ann. Then he took command of the General Arnold, a brigantine of 20 guns that was issued a letter of marque in May 1778. The General Arnold wrecked in Plymouth Bay with the death of 83 of the crew. From 1779 to 1783 James Magee commanded at least three more wartime vessels, the Amsterdam, Hermione, and Gustavus. In 1781 the Amsterdam was captured off Cape Ann by the British frigate Amphytrite. The Gustavus was issued a letter of marque in December 1782.

== China trader ==
Magee was the captain of one of the first American ships to sail to Guangzhou (Canton), China, the Hope, in 1786–1787. The Hope, owned by Samuel Shaw, Isaac Sears, and other New York merchants, left New York City on 4 February 1786. Sailing via the Cape of Good Hope, the Hope arrived at Batavia (today Jakarta) in April, the first American ship to visit that port.

Within months of his return to Boston, James Magee became captain of the Astrea, one of four ships owned by Elias Hasket Derby that sailed from New England to Canton via the Cape of Good Hope in the late 1780s. With Magee's brother-in-law Thomas Handasyd Perkins as supercargo, the Astrea sailed in 1789 with a cargo including 38 tons of ginseng, about $30,000 in specie, and quantities of beeswax, butter, rum, cod, candles, snuff, and iron. It returned to Salem on 1 June 1790 with a cargo of tea and silk. While at Canton Magee encountered Captain Robert Gray of the Columbia Rediviva and John Kendrick of the Lady Washington, who inspired Magee and T.H. Perkins to enter the maritime fur trade themselves. This resulted in the voyage of the Hope under Joseph Ingraham (not the same Hope that Magee had captained earlier), and the Margaret, under James Magee.

After the voyage of Astrea Thomas Handasyd Perkins and his brother James Perkins organized a merchant company known as James and T.H. Perkins and Company or J. and T.H. Perkins, which became one of the largest American companies involved in the China and maritime fur trade business. T.H. Perkins also created a criminal opium syndicate known as The Boston Concern.

James Magee was part owner of several ships involved in the maritime fur trade. Along with Thomas Handasyd Perkins and Russell Sturgis, he was part owner of the Hope, a 70-ton brigantine built at Kittery, Maine in 1789. The Hope sailed to the Pacific Northwest Coast and China from 1790 to 1792 under Joseph Ingraham.

He was also part owner of the Eliza, along with J. and T.H. Perkins, Russell Sturgis, and others, which was built at Providence, Rhode Island in 1796 and voyaged to the Northwest Coast and China in 1799–1800, under captain James Rowan and with 15–year old William F. Sturgis aboard.

Magee was also part owner, along with J. & T.H. Perkins, Russell Sturgis, and Eleazar Johnson, of the Hazard, which was built at Newburyport, Massachusetts in 1796. The Hazard made several voyages to the Northwest Coast and China under captain Benjamin Swift. The first was from 1797–1799, the second was from 1799–1802, the third from 1802–1805. The fourth, under captain William Smith, was from 1805–1808. After James Magee's death his widow Margaret Magee inherited his share and she was one of the owners of the Hazard from July 1802 to April 1809. Margaret Magee was the only Boston woman known to have owned a share in a maritime fur trade vessel.

== Voygage of the Margaret ==
James Magee was captain of the Margaret, which was on the Pacific Northwest Coast in 1792. He was part owner of the Margaret, along with Thomas Handasyd Perkins, Russell Sturgis, and James & Thomas Lamb. The Margaret was a Boston–built ship of 161 tons, 8 swivel guns, and a crew of 25, and was launched in the fall of 1791. The crew included the "historian" Jonathan Howell who, with Magee, collected many artifacts from the Pacific Northwest Coast and Hawaii for the Massachusetts Historical Society.

On 24 October 1791 the Margaret sailed from Boston to the Pacific Northwest coast via Cape Horn, arriving at Houston Stewart Channel in Haida Gwaii in April 1792. James Magee had fallen ill and the first mate, David Lamb, was in command. In May, still at Haida Gwaii, the Margaret encountered the Columbia Rediviva, under captain Robert Gray. Like other traders at the time, Magee found the trade goods he had brought were no longer much desired by the indigenous peoples of the Pacific Northwest Coast. In May 1792 he wrote in the ship's log: "The Articles of Trade we mostly made up of in this place were Muskets, Copper, some Cloathing, a few Iron Necklaces, but any of Iron mechanical Tools they were not fond of except files, which they were very fond of but to our disadvantage we had none."

Robert Haswell, of the Columbia Rediviva wrote that the Margaret was "as fine a vessel as ever I saw of her size, and appeared exceeding well fitted for the voyage and I believe there was no expense spared." The Margaret and Columbia met again on 3 July 1792 near the southern end of Haida Gwaii. The two ships sailed together down the coast of Vancouver Island to Clayoquot Sound. The leader of the Tla-o-qui-aht Nuu-chah-nulth of Clayoquot Sound, Chief Wickaninnish, came on board the Margaret. Robert Gray, also on board Margaret, convinced Wickaninnish to visit the Columbia as well. Wickaninnish did, although according to John Boit, "he did not appear happy". Wickaninnish disliked and feared Gray, who had destroyed the village of Opitsaht with cannon fire earlier in that year.

In late July the Margaret sailed to the Columbia River to trade for furs, with little success. Returning north, on 8 August 1792 the Margaret anchored at Yuquot and the Spanish outpost Santa Cruz de Nuca in Nootka Sound, in company with the Hope, under Joseph Ingraham. On learning of Captain Magee's illness, Juan Francisco de la Bodega y Quadra, the commandant of Santa Cruz de Nuca, offered him a residence on shore. On 12 August the Margaret, under David Lamb, sailed in company with the Hope to search for fur trading opportunities. Magee remained at Santa Cruz de Nuca. When George Vancouver arrived at Nootka Sound on 28 August he noted that Captain Magee was living on shore with his surgeon and John Howell. While at Santa Cruz de Nuca, James Magee, John Howell, and several others, served as witnesses to an official statement made by the Mowachaht Nuu-chah-nulth Chief Maquinna to Bodega y Quadra, having to do with the Nootka Crisis and the claims of John Meares. In addition, Captain Magee sent Vancouver a complaint, saying that the British captains William Brown of the Butterworth and James Baker of the Jenny had fired upon the natives in Clayoquot Sound in August 1792, and should be charged with piracy. Captain Brown of the Butterworth had tried to rob the natives of their furs and, encountering resistance, fired upon them, killing four.

The Margaret, under David Lamb, returned to Nootka Sound on 21 September 1792. The Hope arrived about a week later. During the 1792 season the Margaret had acquired about 1,200 sea otter pelts. Sometime during the season, the Margaret struck a rock in Hecate Strait, southeast of Rose Point, Haida Gwaii. This rock became known as "Margaret Rock". Magee had intended to have the Margaret spend the winter in Nootka Sound, and to build a small schooner to act as a tender for the 1793 season. The furs collected by the Margaret were to be taken to China by the Hope. Instead, some men were left to build the schooner and both the Margaret and Hope sailed together for China, via the Hawaiian Islands. They arrived in Hawaii on 5 November 1792.

On 8 November the Margaret and Hope encountered the Halcyon under Captain Charles Barkley. The three vessels sailed together to Waikiki, Oahu, to procure water. Then they sailed to Kauai, arriving on 11 November. On the 13th the Halcyon left for China. The Margaret did likewise on 21 November, arriving at Macau in early January 1793. While in China David Lamb left the ship. John Howell, the historian also left, having attached himself to Captain John Kendrick of the Lady Washington.

The Margaret left China in late January 1793 and in April arrived on the Pacific Northwest Coast. At Nootka Sound the schooner was finished months before Margaret arrived. Little is known about the schooner. Its name is unknown. It was probably about 30 tons, built by Mr. Smith, the head carpenter, and launched in December 1792. By the time Margaret arrived the schooner had collected upwards of a thousand sea otter skins.

While trading in near Ninstints, Haida Gwaii, Magee found that the Haida "...would not sell them [sea otter furs] for anything but Moose skins which we had none of. These skins the[y] call Clemmons which if we had would command skin for skin." The term "clemmon", also spelled "clammon", "clammel", and other ways, were hides of moose, elk, or sometimes caribou. Among other uses, the Tlingit and Haida used them as a base for armor. Sailing south in the Margaret, Magee obtained a quantity of clemmons at Barkley Sound and the Washington coast. Magee returned north and sold the hides "at the rate of 3 prime [sea otter] skins for the best sort [of clemmon] & 2 for the second".

Between the Margaret and the schooner, over 3,000 sea otter pelts were collected in 1793, a remarkable feat given that there were at least ten competing ships. At the end of the 1793 trading season the Margaret sailed to China via Hawaii, arriving at Oahu in October and Canton in December 1793. The fate of the schooner is unknown. From Canton the Margaret returned to Boston in company with the schooner Jane, belonging to the Dorr family. On 17 August 1794 the Margaret arrived at Boston. Upon return, James Magee presented the Massachusetts Historical Society with an "extract of the log-books and journals" and a large collection of "curiosities", most of which are now in the collection of the Peabody Museum of Archaeology and Ethnology at Harvard University. The voyage of the Margaret was very profitable and inspired many other New Englanders to enter the maritime fur trade.

== Later life ==
The voyage of the Margaret was James Magee's last. He was now wealthy and successful, and settled down in Roxbury. He continued to join commercial ventures but did not again captain ships himself. In 1798 he bought the former mansion of Governor William Shirley. Later, in 1819, his widow Margaret Magee sold the property to Governor William Eustis. Thus today the mansion is known as the Shirley–Eustis House. During his voyages James Magee had collected a number of artifacts, which he presented at various times to Harvard University, the Massachusetts Historical Society, and the Boston Marine Society. He was a member of the Boston Marine Society and the Charitable Irish Society of Boston.

In 1795 James Magee, along with James Lamb, Russell Sturgis, and Stephen Hills (sometimes called "Hill"), bought the British brig Fairy, which they renamed Sea Otter. The Sea Otter sailed to the Northwest Coast and China in 1795–1798. The captain was Stephen Hills and the supercargo Mr. Elliot. Sometime in 1796, at Cumshewa, Cumshewa Inlet, in Haida Gwaii, the captain, supercargo, and two others, were killed by Haida when they went ashore in a small boat. According to William F. Sturgis, the attack was led by the Haida Chief Scotsi, his brother, and a few others, and was in retaliation for a "vile outrage" that had shortly before "been committed by the crew of an English vessel". The Sea Otter continued under the command of William Bowles, who had been first mate. Among the officers was James Rowan, who later took revenge upon Scotsi and others while captain of the Eliza. The Sea Otter arrived in Canton in November 1797 with a cargo of 2,520 sea otter skins and 2,755 sea otter tails, valued at over $47,000. The vessel returned to Boston in July 1798 with almost 50,000 pounds of tea, 7,000 pieces of nankeens, 100 sets of chinaware, 300 tea sets, and a quantity of silk fabric and thread. The owners made a profit ten times the value of their original investment.

In 1800–1801 James Magee's brother, Bernard, captained the Globe on another voyage to the Northwest Coast and China. The Globe was a 245-ton ship built in 1800 at Newbury, Massachusetts. It was owned by J. and T.H. Perkins, and Bernard and James Magee. Bernard Magee was killed in 1801 at Skidegate, Haida Gwaii, when the Globe, was attacked by Haida. According to William F. Sturgis, the attack was retribution for the execution of five Kaigani Haida chiefs by James D. Ingersoll, captain of the Charlotte. Ingersoll's act was itself retribution for an earlier attack upon the Belle Savage.

By 1800 James Magee's health was failing. In the fall of 1800 Magee and his wife joined Thomas Handasyd Perkins on a trip to Ballston Spa and Saratoga Springs, New York, partly for Magee's health. A few months after returning to Boston James Magee suffered the last of several strokes. He died on 2 February 1801, in his home at Roxbury. He was buried in the mass grave of the General Arnold’s crew, on Burial Hill in Plymouth, per his last will and testament.

James and Margaret Magee had nine children. All but one, Mary Magee, died young. Their son Charles Magee lived just long enough to marry and have a daughter.

== See also ==
- List of historical ships in British Columbia
