= St Peter's Church, Combwich =

Church in Somerset, England

St Peter's Church
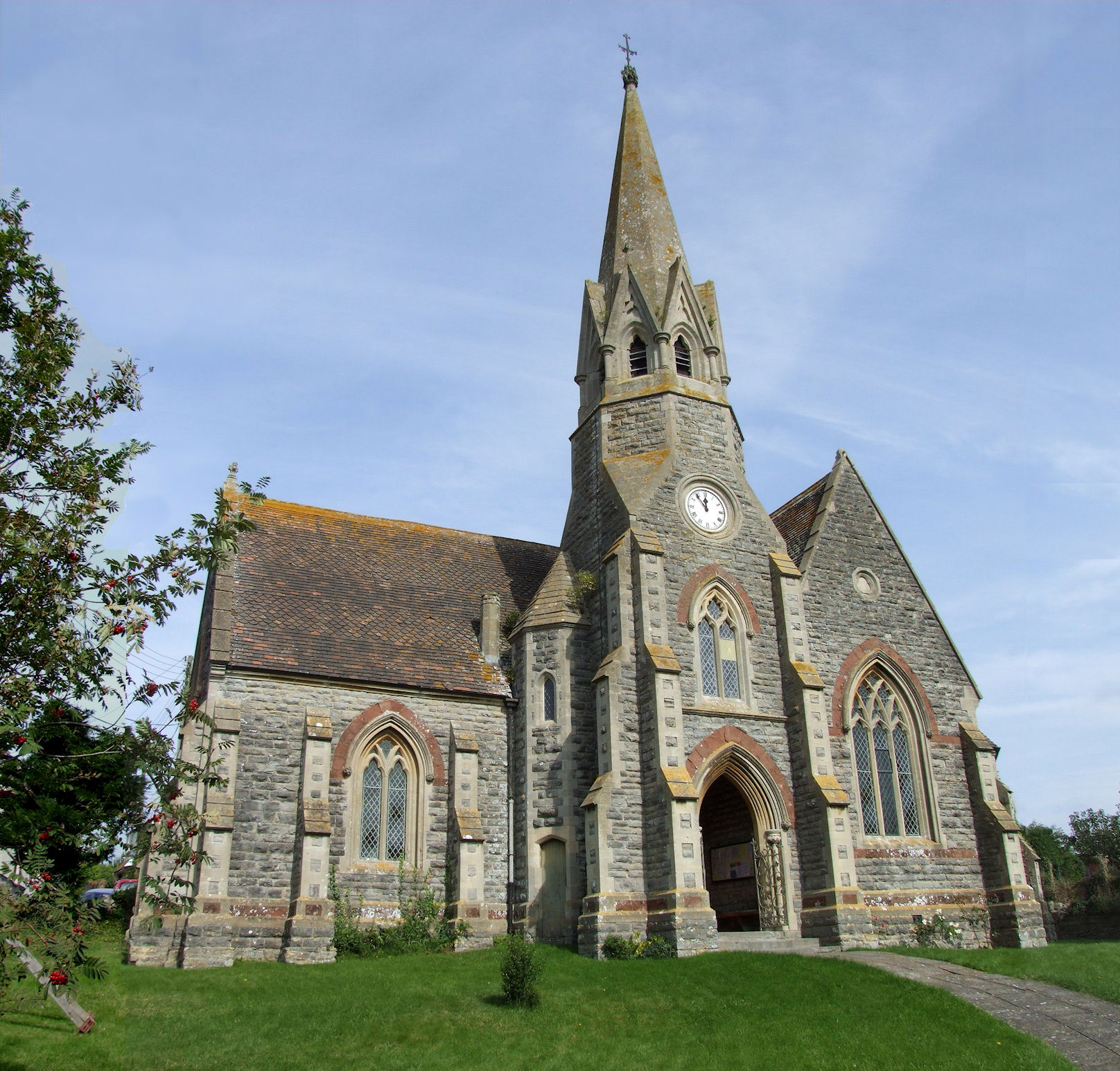
- St Peter's Church

Religion
- Affiliation: Church of England
- Ecclesiastical or organizational status: Active
- Year consecrated: 1870

Location
- Location: Combwich, Somerset, England
- Interactive map of St Peter's Church
- Coordinates: 51.1748°N 3.0618°W

Architecture
- Architect: Charles Knowles
- Type: Church

St Peter's Church is a Church of England church in Combwich, Somerset, England. The church, which was designed by Charles Knowles, was built in 1867–70 and has been a Grade II listed building since 1985.

== History ==
St Peter's was built as a chapel of ease to the parish church of All Saints, Otterhampton. It was erected largely at the expense of Mrs. Susanna Jeffery, the widow of Rev. Dr. John Jeffery, rector of Otterhampton, to serve both residents of the village and those living between Cannington and Otterhampton. Before his death in 1861, Rev. Jeffery had expressed wish for a church to be erected to serve the village and he bequeathed £1,500 towards such a building on the condition that an additional £500 be raised within a specified time. Although the bequest had lapsed by the time the additional money was raised, Mrs. Jeffery, who had received the £1,500, chose to donate it back to the cause.

Plans for the church were drawn up by Mr. Charles Knowles of Bridgwater and a plot of land acquired from an orchard belonging to Mr. Lee. The foundation stone was laid by Mrs. John Evered, daughter of Rev. Jeffery, on 23 July 1867 and the church built by Mr. Abraham Squibbs of Bridgwater. It was consecrated by the Bishop of Bath and Wells, Rev. Lord Arthur Hervey, on 24 October 1870.

In 1873, Mrs. Jeffery presented the church with five bells, made by John Taylor & Co of Loughborough. A lectern of carved oak, walnut and pitch pine, was presented to the church in 1886, designed and created by Rev. Charles G. Anderson, the rector of Otterhampton, in memory of his uncle Rev. Edward Poole, vicar of Alvaston and Boulton, who died two years earlier.

The parish of Otterhampton was united with Stockland in 1971 and went on to form part of the united benefice of Cannington, Otterhampton, Combwich, and Stockland from 1984. When All Saints at Otterhampton was declared redundant in 1988, St Peter's became the parish church.

== Architecture ==
St Peter's is built of Blue Lias rubble, with red sandstone banding and tile roofs, in the Perpendicular style. It was built to accommodate 240 persons and is made up of a three-bay nave with one-bay north and south transepts, an apsidal chancel with vestry, and a tower, containing the south porch and an octagonal belfry with spire. Much of the church's original 19th century fittings remain in place. A tablet under the west window records the church as being erected by Mrs. Jeffery "in honoured memory of her late husband, and to carry out his wishes for the spiritual good of the inhabitants of Combwich."
