= Destruction Island =

Island in Washington state, US

Coordinates: 47.675°N 124.484°W

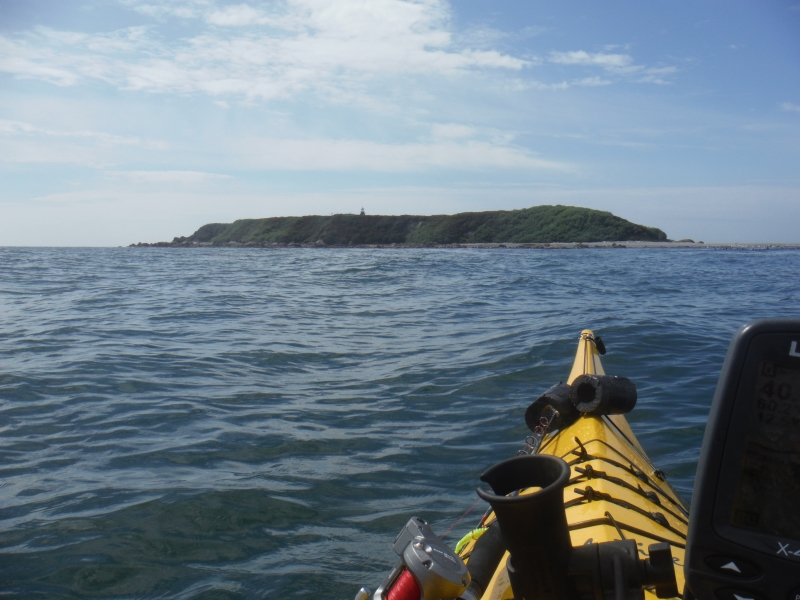
Destruction Island from the east

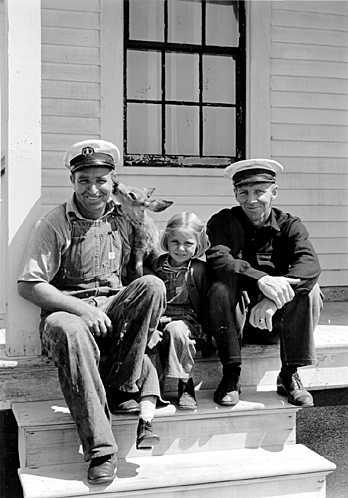
Albert Beyer, the lighthouse keeper on Destruction Island, his daughter, and Elmer Winbeck, skipper of the Coast Guard boat Quillayute. The young fawn came from the Elwha River. Photo: George A. Grant, 1940

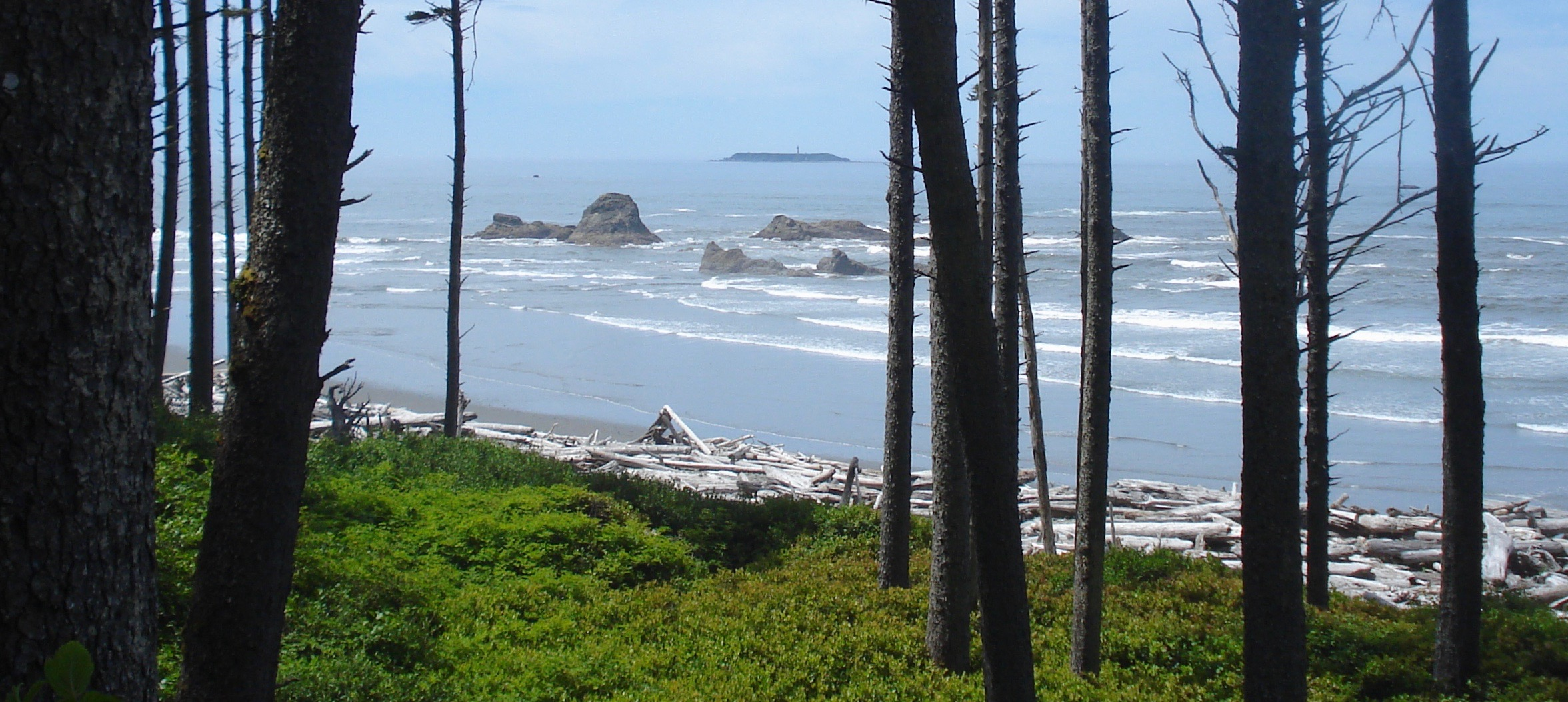
Destruction Island as seen from Ruby Beach.

Destruction Island (also known historically as Green Island and Isla de Dolores/Island of Sorrows) is a 30-acre (12 ha) island located approximately 3.5 miles (6 km) off the Washington coast. Home to seabirds, shorebirds, and marine mammals, it is part of the Quillayute Needles National Wildlife Refuge.

Hoh native Americans used to frequent Destruction Island to capture rhinoceros auklets. In recent years the population of rhinoceros auklets has been in decline as a result of habitat loss and eagle predation due to the presence of non-native European rabbits.

Destruction Island's name is derived from two massacres which happened nearby. In 1775, Spanish Navy lieutenant Juan Francisco de la Bodega y Quadra dispatched a crew of seven men to the mainland in order to gather wood and fresh water on the beach near Point Grenville, but they were attacked and killed by an estimated three hundred local Native Americans, leading him to name it Isla de Dolores (Island of Sorrows). Twelve years later, Captain Charles William Barkley, an independent English fur trader, arrived in the ship Imperial Eagle and sent a party ashore from the island, to a similar fate. Barkley named the river where the second massacre took place the Destruction River. Captain George Vancouver later transferred the name to Isla de Dolores when the river was named after the tribe in the area, the Hoh River.

Three shipwrecks occurred at the island in 1889: Cassanora Adams, Port Gordon, and Wide West. The 94 foot (29 m) Destruction Island Lighthouse was built on Destruction Island in 1888–91. A US Coast Guard detachment operated the lighthouse from 1939 to the early 1970s. The light was automated in 1968, before it was shut off for good in April 2008. The island itself is accessible only by boat. On the mainland coast about 4 miles northeast is the popular Ruby Beach, from which both the island and the lighthouse are visible.
