= Imperial Eagle (disambiguation) =

Imperial Eagle can refer to:

== In heraldry ==
- the military standard of the Roman Empire, see Aquila (Roman)
- the Byzantine imperial eagle
- the German Reichsadler
- the French Imperial Eagle, the regimental symbol used by Napoleon Bonaparte's French armies

== Species ==
- Eastern imperial eagle
- Spanish imperial eagle

== Other ==
- a British merchant ship of the 1780s, the Imperial Eagle

== See also ==
- double-headed eagle
