= Charles William Barkley =

English ship captain and fur trader

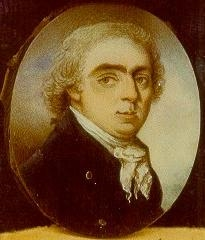
Portrait of Charles Barkley

Charles William Barkley (c. 1759 – 16 May 1832) was an English ship captain and maritime fur trader. He was born in Hertford, England, son of Charles Barkley.

His name is sometimes erroneously spelled Barclay due to the misspelling "Barclay Sound" (in what is now Vancouver Island, British Columbia) on early Admiralty charts, which arose from a mistake from Land District records. The misspelling originated in 1859 with the government agent William Eddy Banfield who issued certificates identifying the "Barclay Land District." The name was corrected to Barkley Sound in 1904. (Banfield's own name was misspelled in the name of the town of Bamfield, also on Vancouver Island.)

== Biography ==
=== Early life ===
At the age of 11, Charles Barkley went to sea with his father, who was the commander of the East India Company ship Pacific. His father drowned in the Hooghly River, Calcutta, India while Charles was still a boy. Charles went on to sail to the West Indies in the merchantman Bestsy. He made seven voyages to the Far East for the East India Company and rose rapidly in the company's service.

He was married in 1786, he soon after left the East India Company, taking what was apparently his first command, the 400-ton ship Loundon, ready for a trading voyage to the Pacific Northwest coast of North America. The ship, which was renamed Imperial Eagle and falsely registered as an Austrian in an attempt to avoid the cost of acquiring a trading licence from the East India Company, was owned by various supercargoes, including several East India Company directors in England, who together called themselves the Austrian East India Company. Daniel Beale organised the voyage of the Imperial Eagle when he returned to London from Canton on the HCS General Coote in August 1786. Beale had been the purser of, successively, the HC ships Walpole and General Coote on voyages between London and Canton in 1783–1786: in 1783 he joined the Canton partnership of John Henry Cox and John Reid in their mercantile ventures. Beale's brother or cousin, John Beale, sailed in the Imperial Eagle as purser, but was killed in an affray with the natives on the North West Coast. Barkley was among the backers, subscribing £3,000 to the venture. John Meares, who was also attempting to avoid license fees by falsely sailing under the Portuguese flag, was also one of the backers.

=== Merchant career ===
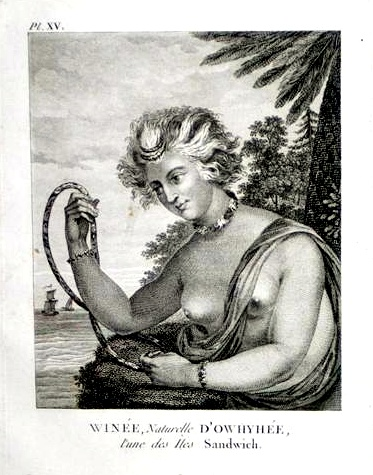
Wynee, a Native of Owyhee, one of the Sandwich Islands, engraving by John Meares depicting the Hawaiian maidservant of the Barkley's.

Barkley and his wife, Frances Barkley, left for the Pacific via Cape Horn on 24 November 1786. They stopped in the Hawaiian Islands where a maidservant named Wynee (Winée) was taken aboard. Wynee became the first Native Hawaiian, or "Kanaka", to reach British Columbia. From Hawaii, Barkley sailed the Imperial Eagle to Nootka Sound, on the west coast of Vancouver Island, arriving in June 1787. At 400 tons, the Imperial Eagle was the largest ship to ever enter the main harbour of Friendly Cove in Nootka Sound.

Barkley was surprised to find John Mackay, who had come to Nootka Sound with James Strange over a year before. Mackay had volunteered to remain at Nootka and work to establish relationships until Strange returned the next year. But Strange never returned. By the time Barkley arrived Mackay had learned the Nuu-chah-nulth's language and customs, adapted himself to their ways, and married a young native girl. At first Mackay was welcomed and befriended by Maquinna, but after unknowingly breaking a taboo he was exiled from Maquinna's house and forced to survive on his own. Barkley took Mackay on board Imperial Eagle. Mackay's experience helped Barkley gain an edge in the fur trade.

Barkley stayed at Nootka Sound for about a month, acquired 700 prime sea otter skins, and many more of inferior quality. From Nootka he sailed south, trading, exploring, and naming various parts of the coast between Nootka Sound and the Strait of Juan de Fuca, including Barkley Sound, Loudoun Channel, Cape Beale, and Imperial Eagle Channel. In honour of the indigenous chief Wickaninnish, Barkley gave the name Wickinninish Sound to what is now called Clayoquot Sound. He rediscovered the strait allegedly described by Juan de Fuca and named the strait as such on his chart. Barkley's Imperial Eagle was the first non-indigenous vessel to enter Neah Bay, in July 1787. John Meares, in the Feliz Aventureira, stopped at Neah Bay in June 1788, and Charles Duncan in Princess Royal did so in August 1788. Robert Gray, in the Lady Washington, entered Neah Bay in April 1789, and in July 1789 José María Narváez did so in the Santa Gertrudis la Magna. Within the next few years a number of others visited Neah Bay and it became an important fur trading stop during the maritime fur trading era.

After six members of his crew were killed by indigenous people, on 24 July 1787, near the mouth of the Hoh River, Barkley decided to set sail for Guangzhou (Canton), China, to sell his sea otter pelts. He arrived in Macau in December 1787. His trading venture resulted in a profit of £10,000. Barkley gave the name Destruction River to what is now called the Hoh River, after his crew members were killed by the indigenous people. The name has since been transferred to nearby Destruction Island. The Native Hawaiian maidservant named Wynee (Winée) was left in China. Later she was found there by John Meares and sailed with him back to her homeland but she died of illness on 5 February 1788 during the voyage and her body was committed to the deep.

He then left China and sailed with a cargo to Mauritius. While in Mauritius, Barkley learned that the East India Company was taking legal action against the owners of the Imperial Eagle for trading without a license. The owners, including John Meares, decided to avoid the legal problems by selling the Imperial Eagle and breaking their contract with Barkley. Charles and Frances Barkley stayed in Mauritius for over a year, where they had their first child. They then sailed to Kolkata (Calcutta), India, where the Imperial Eagle was confiscated. Barkley sued for damages and received £5,000 for the loss of his ten-year contract. At the same time, John Meares gained possession of Barkley's nautical gear and his journal. Frances Barkley later wrote that Meares, "with the greatest effrontery, published and claimed the merit of my husband's discoveries therein contained, besides inventing lies of the most revolting nature tending to vilify the person he thus pilfered."

=== Later years ===
After this series of events Charles and Frances Barkley found themselves stranded in Mauritius, without a ship and burdened with a newborn. Over the course of two years they managed to make their way to the Netherlands, then England. Frances was the first woman to sail around the world without deception. Only two women are known to have sailed around the world before Frances: Jeanne Baré, disguised as a man, and Rose de Freycinet, wife of Louis de Freycinet, as a stowaway.

Barkley continued his merchant captain career. He commanded Princess Frederica, sailing in the Indian Ocean into 1791. Then he returned to the Pacific Northwest coast, in command of the 80-ton brig Halcyon. He traded for sea otter pelts in Sitka Sound, then sailed to the Hawaiian Islands, China, and Mauritius. In late November, 1792, Barkley's Halcyon met and briefly sailed with the maritime fur trading vessels Margaret, under James Magee, and Hope, under Joseph Ingraham.

Little is known of his latter years. They were probably not prosperous. Upon his death at the age of 73 he left two sons and two daughters, and was survived by his wife Frances.

== Legacy ==
- Barkley Sound between Ucluelet and Bamfield on the west coast of Vancouver Island is named for him.
- The Seamen wrote "Charles Barkley" in 2018, a rap song that has many references to the explorer.
