= Hope (1789 brigantine) =

History

United States
- Name: Hope
- Owner: Thomas Handasyd Perkins, Russell Sturgis, and James Magee
- Laid down: 1789, at Kittery, Maine
- Launched: 1789

General characteristics
- Class & type: Brigantine
- Tons burthen: 70 or 72 (bm)
- Propulsion: Sail
- Sail plan: Brigantine
- Crew: 16
- Armament: 12 cannon; 6 swivel guns

Hope was an American brigantine built at Kittery, Maine in 1789 for use in the maritime fur trade and owned by Thomas Handasyd Perkins, Russell Sturgis, and James Magee.

The Hope left Boston on September 16, 1790, for the Pacific Northwest Coast under the command of Joseph Ingraham, former first mate on board the Columbia Rediviva under the command of first John Kendrick and then Robert Gray. The Hope sailed around Cape Horn, passing by the southern tip of South America on January 26, 1791. Hope next touched land on April 14 when she put in at Port Madre de Dios on the island of Dominica, part of the Marquesas Islands chain. There the ship took on limited provisions before setting sail once again. Then on April 19, they discovered a small uncharted island group. The five islands were situated about 9 degrees south of the equator, and Ingraham named them the Washington Islands. This group is part of the Marquesas Islands of the Pacific Ocean. Ingraham named many of the islands: Washington for the president, Adams for the vice president, Federal, Franklin, Knox, and lastly Lincoln for a general. The islands are approximately at 9° 20' south of the equator and 140° 54' west of London.

On 17 January 1791, Hope was off Cape Horn when she encountered Necker, under the command of Captain John Hawes, which was on her way to engage in whaling in the Pacific. The sea was calm so Hawes invited Ingraham to dine with him, apparently on an excellent dinner of roast pork, a pig having just been killed. The two captains decided to travel in company as they were going in the same direction, and sailing at the same rate. The two vessels stayed together for 18 days, but then on 4 February a gale came up that separated them. At the time they were north of the western entrance to the Straits of Magellan. (Note: Ingraham made a number of beautifully drawn charts as he travelled. One chart is of Hope's track around Cape Horn. The chart includes a small drawing of Hope and Necker with land behind them.)

After leaving the Marquesas the Hope sailed north to the Hawaiian Islands and then on to Haida Gwaii on the Northwest Coast, arriving in June, 1791. The ship and crew spent the summer trading very successfully for sea otter pelts with the Indigenous peoples of the Pacific Northwest Coast. In the fall Ingraham sailed to Canton, China, where the furs were sold via the Canton System. He sailed back to the Northwest Coast from Canton, arriving in July, 1792. During the first Northwest Coast cruise Ingraham had dealt creatively with the changing demand for trade goods among the native peoples. He had his crew fashion neckrings out of thick iron and copper wire, twisted together. These were extremely popular on the coast in 1791. When he returned in 1792 he found to his dismay that demands had changed and he could barely give away his trade goods. As a result, his voyage ended up losing money in the end.

In August the Hope met the Margaret, under James Magee, at Nootka Sound. On August 12 the Hope and Margaret, temporarily commanded by first mate David Lamb, sailed from Nootka Sound in company, seeking fur trading opportunities. Near Haida Gwaii they separated, but rejoined at Nootka Sound near the end of September.

On September 26, 1792, the Hope was in Neah Bay on the Olympic Peninsula with the Spanish vessels Princesa and Activo under the command of Spanish Commodore Juan Francisco de la Bodega y Quadra. This day Captain Gray arrived aboard the Columbia along with the smaller Adventure that was then sold to Quadra.

In October 1792 the Hope and Margaret sailed in company for the Hawaiian Islands. On November 8 the Margaret and Hope encountered the Halcyon under Captain Charles Barkley. The three vessels sailed together to Waikiki, Oahu, to procure water. Then they sailed to Kauai, arriving on 11 November. On the 13th the Halcyon left for Guangzhou (Canton), China. The Hope and Margaret did likewise shortly after. On the journey to China, the ship log shows the Hope passing by Formosa. From Canton the Hope sailed back to Boston.

Captain Ingraham's log of the voyage was published in 1971 as Journal of the Brigantine Hope on a Voyage to the Northwest Coast of North America, 1790–1792. Unlike many ship logs of the time it is full of insightful commentary, humor, good charts, beautiful illustrations of people, plants, animals, and more. Ebenezer Dorr kept a log and journal of the voyage, of which two portions survive.

== See also ==
- History of the west coast of North America
- List of ships in British Columbia
