= Joseph Ingraham =

American explorer (1762–1800)

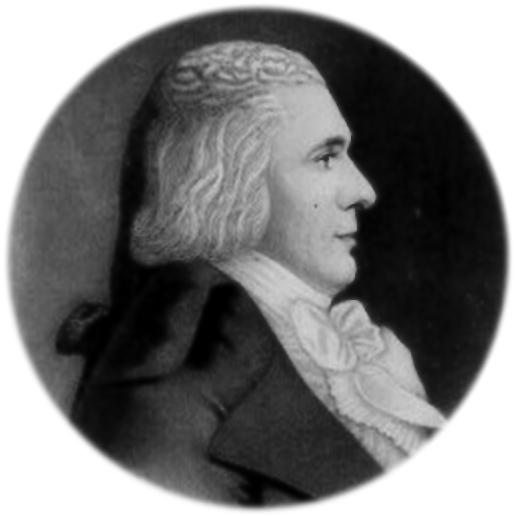
- Joseph Ingraham 1762–1800
- Born: 1762
- Died: 1800 (aged 37–38)
- Military career
- Allegiance: United States of America
- Branch: United States Navy
- Conflicts: American Revolutionary War; Quasi-War

Joseph Ingraham (1762–1800) was an American sailor and maritime fur trader who discovered several islands of the Marquesas Islands while on his way to trade along the west coast of North America. He was also a prisoner in the American Revolutionary War and an officer in the United States Navy.

== Early life ==
During the War of Independence, Ingraham was a sailor captured by the British. He spent part of the war on a prison ship. In 1787, he was second mate aboard the Columbia Rediviva under the command of John Kendrick when it sailed to the Pacific Northwest to engage in the fur trade.

== Pacific voyages ==
Ingraham's 1790-93 voyage

On September 16, 1790, Ingraham set sail from Boston as captain of the brig Hope. The owners and investors of the ship and venture were Thomas Handasyd Perkins, Russell Sturgis, James and Thomas Lamb, and James Magee. These investors also owned the Margaret, which, under Captain James Magee, frequently sailed in company with the Hope. Ingraham's intention was to return to the northwest coast to partake in the fur trade. Ingraham and his ship sailed around Cape Horn on January 26, 1791. Their next stop was at Madre de Dios Island in Chile on April 14. While in this Spanish port they took on some provisions before sailing north again. A few days later, on April 19, 1792, Ingraham discovered a small uncharted island group. These islands were situated roughly nine degrees south of the Equator. Captain Ingraham named the group Washington Islands, and named many of the individual islands: Washington Island for the president, Adams Island for the vice president, Federal Island, Franklin Island, Knox Island and Lincoln Island for a general. The islands are approximately 9° 20' south of the Equator and 140° 54' west of Greenwich. These islands are part of the Marquesas Islands. From the Marquesas archipelago, Ingraham sailed north to the Sandwich Islands before sailing on to the Queen Charlotte Islands on the northwest coast of North America.

After arriving off the coast of North America, Ingraham set about trading for the fur pelts he was sent to bargain for from the natives. On September 26, 1792, Ingraham encountered his former captain, Captain Robert Gray, captain of the Columbia, in Neah Bay near Cape Flattery. Gray was there to sell his small craft, Adventure, to the Spanish. Adventure was under the command of Ingraham's former shipmate Robert Haswell. The next day Ingraham and Hope set sail with the Spanish vessel Princesa that was sailing north to Nootka Sound to deliver Spain's new administrator to that outpost. After spending the summer trading for fur pelts from the natives along the coast, Ingraham sailed to China via the Sandwich Islands, and then back to Boston. On the journey to mainland China the ship log shows the crew passing by the island of Formosa. This voyage was a commercial failure.

== Later life ==
During the United States' undeclared Quasi-War with France in the late 1790s, Ingraham served as a naval officer. He was a lieutenant, last appearing on Navy Department records on June 14, 1799. Joseph Ingraham was lost at sea in fall 1800 while serving on the USS Pickering.

== Legacy ==
Ingraham Bay and Ingraham Point, in Alaska, are named for Joseph Ingraham.

== See also ==
- History of the west coast of North America
- List of people who disappeared mysteriously at sea
