= Shirley–Eustis House =

Historic house in Massachusetts, United States

- U.S. National Register of Historic Places
- U.S. National Historic Landmark
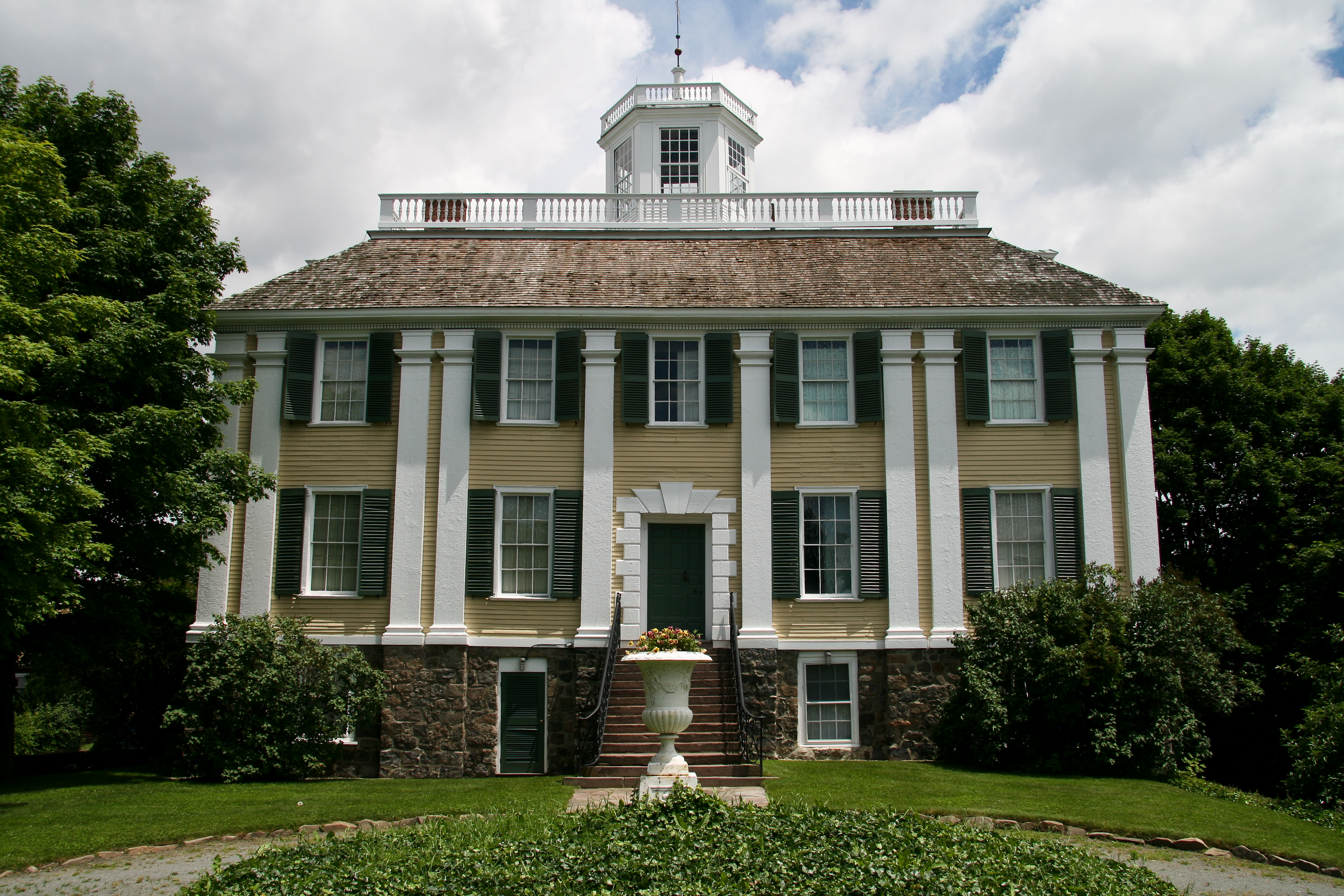

- Location within Massachusetts Location within the United States
- Location: 33 Shirley Street, Roxbury, Massachusetts
- Coordinates: 42°19′24″N 71°4′21″W
- Area: .25 acres (0.10 ha)
- Built: 1751 (275 years ago)
- Architect: Peter Harrison
- Architectural style: Georgian
- Website: www.shirleyeustishouse.org
- NRHP reference No.: 66000787

Significant dates
- Added to NRHP: October 15, 1966
- Designated NHL: October 9, 1960

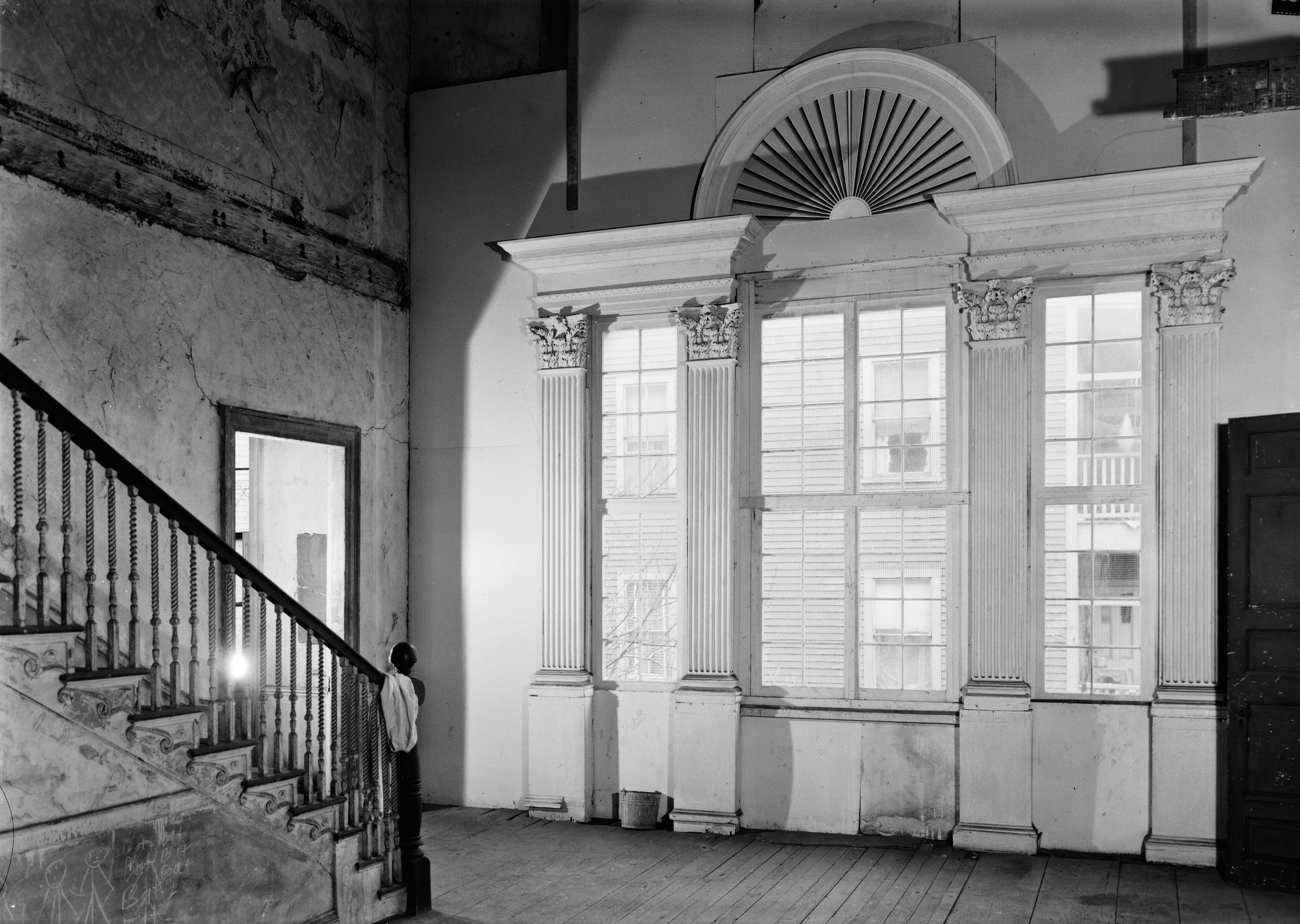
Interior before restoration (1963)

The Shirley–Eustis House is a historic house located at 33 Shirley Street, Boston, Massachusetts. It is a U.S. National Historic Landmark.

The house was built between 1747 and 1751 on 33 acres (13 ha) in Roxbury by William Shirley (1694–1771), Royal Governor of the Province of Massachusetts Bay, and served as his summer home. The house is attributed to architect Peter Harrison, and built in part by Thomas Dawes, it is one of four remaining mansions of Royal Governors in the United States.

In 1763 Shirley's son-in-law Eliakim Hutchinson, Chief Justice of the Court of Common Pleas for Suffolk County, and one of Boston's richest men, acquired the house from his father-in-law. Upon retirement from his post as Governor of the Bahamas in 1769, William Shirley moved in with his daughter and son-in-law and lived there until his death in 1771.

After Hutchinson died in 1775, the house was occupied by Colonel Asa Whitcomb's Massachusetts Sixth Foot Regiment, and in 1778 it was seized as Loyalist property. It then sat unoccupied until purchased in 1782, then passed through a succession of owners, including the widow of a French planter in Haiti, a real estate speculator, and the China merchant James Magee. Magee's youngest son, Augustus Magee, who was raised in the house, led the 1812–13 Gutierrez-Magee Expedition, a filibuster in Spanish Texas that briefly liberated that province during the Mexican War of Independence. James Magee's widow Margaret, sold the house to Congressman William Eustis, Secretary of War under President James Madison during the War of 1812, Ambassador to the Netherlands 1815–1818, and the first Democratic-Republican governor of Massachusetts from 1823 to 1825.

After the death of Eustis's wife in 1865, the estate passed to relatives who auctioned off the contents of the house. In 1867, its site was subdivided in 53 lots and sold. The mansion was also sold, and moved about 60 feet (18 m) to make way for Shirley Street.

By 1886, the house had more than a dozen tenants; it was abandoned in 1911.

In 1913, William Sumner Appleton, who had recently founded the Society for the Preservation of New England Antiquities, founded the Shirley–Eustis House Association to save the house, which was then used for storage of antiquities.

The house was declared a National Historic Landmark in 1960.

In the 1980s, historical architect Robert G. Neiley and the Shirley Eustis House Association spearheaded the salvation of the crumbling structure. Extensive restoration, carried out by Neiley himself in collaboration with McGinley Hart & Associates, began in the 1980s, and in 1991 the house opened to the public. The restoration, which included restoring the grounds to include an orchard, period perennial beds, parterre gardens, and a large lawn, won a Boston Preservation Alliance award for the best-restored small-scale structure in the City of Boston.

The building's staircase is believed to have been the inspiration for the one within the Old State House in Boston.

In 2021, the house was designated as a Boston Landmark, along with the adjacent outbuilding at 42–44 Shirley Street.

== See also ==
- List of National Historic Landmarks in Boston
- National Register of Historic Places listings in southern Boston, Massachusetts
