= Imperial Eagle (ship) =

History

Great Britain
- Name: Loudoun (1774-1786)
- Owner: Austrian East India Company (Imperial Eagle)
- Builder: Liverpool
- Launched: 1774
- Renamed: Imperial Eagle (1786-88)
- Fate: Confiscated, 1788.

General characteristics
- Tons burthen: 400 (bm)
- Propulsion: Sail
- Sail plan: Full-rigged ship
- Armament: Loudon: 18 × 9-pounder + 3 × 6-pounder guns 20 guns

Imperial Eagle, originally named Loudoun (also spelled Louden, Loudin, and Lowden), was a 400-ton (bm) British merchant ship, launched in 1774 at Liverpool. By 1780 her master was S. Rains, her owner Robertson, and her trade a transport out of London. In 1786 she underwent refitting at Shadwell Dock, Thames, London. She then sailed on maritime fur trading ventures in the late 1780s. She was under the command of Captain Charles William Barkley until confiscated in India.

Although some sources, such as Miller, state that Loudon was a former East Indiaman, Hardy and Hardy do not list her under any of the alternative spellings of her name, among the vessels that performed voyages for the British East India Company (EIC). The National Archives's guide to East India Company records in the "British Library: Asian and African Studies (previously Oriental and India Office Library)" also has no record of any vessel bearing her name, in any of its alternative spellings.

As Imperial Eagle, she was among the first ships used in the trading system that developed in the 1780s, in which traders collected sea otter pelts on the Pacific Northwest coast of North America, through trade with the indigenous peoples, and then sold them in Guangzhou (Canton) or Macau, China. The Hawaiian Islands, only recently discovered, were a key way station, with many trading vessels spending the winter there. This maritime fur trading system had originated from the voyages of James Cook, which unexpectedly had revealed the value of sea otter pelts in China.

== Austrian East India Company ==
Although Imperial Eagle was British-owned and operated, the ship masqueraded as a vessel of the fictitious Austrian East India Company, and sailed under the flag of Austria. In fact the ship was owned by various British supercargoes, including some in China and several East India Company directors in England. They called their partnership the Austrian East India Company. John Reid and Daniel Beale were two of the supercargoes. Beale, operating out of Canton, acted as the Prussian agent in that port.

The real Austrian East India Company, also called the Ostend Company, which had existed from 1722 to 1731, had nothing to do with Imperial Eagle. In 1775 the Austrian East India Company was briefly revived when Maria Theresa of Austria granted a charter to William Bolts to establish "Imperial Company of Trieste", which operated until 1785, when it went bankrupt. John Reid was the agent of his company in Canton; he was also one of the owners of Imperial Eagle.

The ship's owners changed her name from Loudoun to Imperial Eagle as an attempt to evade paying for trading licenses from the East India Company and the South Sea Company, which together held a monopoly on all British trade in the Far East and Pacific. The East India Company controlled British trade in Asia and the South Sea Company controlled the Pacific trade on the west coast of the Americas. British traders wanting to work within the companies' domains were legally bound to acquire licenses. The cost was exorbitantly expensive. In the late 18th century a number of independent British traders, notably John Meares, sailed under false flags in order to evade paying for the required licenses. It was akin to flying a flag of convenience but due to the company monopolies, it was illegal for British traders to do so.

== Description ==
Imperial Eagle was a "fine vessel" of 400 tons, ship-rigged and mounting twenty guns. It was very large for its intended use. Its real name is usually spelled Loudoun, but Frances Barkley spelled it Louden and Loudin, and James Colnett spelled it Lowden.

== Voyage of 1786-1788 ==
There are only a few printed sources that describe the 1787 voyage of Imperial Eagle or Loudoun. The most thorough is the diary kept by Frances Barkley. George Dixon wrote briefly but vaguely about the ship. John Meares wrote about it in his Voyages, but his account is full of inaccuracies and most of the references to Imperial Eagle are deliberately misleading. Meares, who had acquired Barkley journal and logbook, published maps he claimed to have made himself, based on his own voyages, but which he copied from Barkley's charts. Another source is the journal of James Colnett.

In London, under the name Loudoun, the ship was outfitted for a trading voyage to the Pacific. Charles Barkley was persuaded to resign his position with the East India Company in order to command the ship for its private fur trading venture. Serving under Captain Barkley was Chief Officer Henry Folger, Second Officer William Miller, and Purser John Beale.

Loudoun left the Thames on 6 September 1786 and sailed to Ostend, which was then under Austrian control and today is part of Belgium. There, more supplies were picked up. While at Ostend the ship was renamed Imperial Eagle and began to fly the Austrian flag. Austrian papers were supplied and the ship was registered under its false name. Also while at Ostend, Captain Barkley met Frances Hornby Trevor. They were married in Ostend on 27 October 1786. Frances Barkley accompanied her husband on two voyages lasting over eight years, circumnavigating the globe twice. Frances was the first European woman to visit the Hawaiian Islands. She was the first woman known to have sailed, openly as a woman, around the world.

Imperial Eagle sailed from Ostend on 24 November 1786, first to the Cape Verde Islands, then Bahia, Brazil. After rounding Cape Horn Barkley sailed to the Hawaiian Islands. In Hawaii Frances Barkley met a young Native Hawaiian named Winée, who was taken on as a maidservant. Imperial Eagle left Hawaii on 25 May.

=== Nootka Sound ===
In March 1787 Barkley anchored Imperial Eagle in Nootka Sound, a port commonly used by fur trading vessels. Frances Barkley became the first European woman, and Winée the first Hawaiian, or Kanaka, known to have visited the Pacific Northwest. Imperial Eagle was the largest ship to have ever entered Friendly Cove, the main anchorage in Nootka Sound. It was also the first fur trading vessel to arrive at Nootka Sound that year. As a result, Barkley was able to acquire all of the available furs. At Nootka, Dr. John Mackay was found living with the indigenous Nuu-chah-nulth. Mackey had been the surgeon of the fur trading brig Captain Cook, under Captain James Strange, who had left Mackay at Nootka in July 1786, with the intention that Mackay befriend the indigenous people, learn their customs, and collect sea otter pelts for trade when Strange returned. But Strange did not return. Mackay was overjoyed to join the crew of Imperial Eagle. Mackay taught Barkley much about the indigenous peoples and how to trade with them. He also provided valuable geographical information about the waters south of Nootka Sound, which gave Barkley an advantage over other traders such as James Colnett, who arrived shortly after Barkley. Barkley stayed at Nootka Sound for some time and acquired about 700 prime sea otter pelts and many more of inferior quality. Frances Barkley wrote about chief Maquinna. She was impressed with his management of the fur trade. Some time after Barkley's arrival, two more fur trading ships entered Nootka Sound—Prince of Wales under James Colnett, and Princess Royal under Charles Duncan, both owned by the King George's Sound Company. To their chagrin they found that Barkley had already acquired all the furs available at Nootka Sound.

Colnett's journal provides additional information about Imperial Eagle. Colnett always referred to the ship as Lowden and was not fooled by the Austrian flag. He knew the ship was sailing under a false flag without the proper licenses—licenses which Colnett had taken the time to acquire. In his journal Colnett wrote that the time Barkley saved in not acquiring the licenses allowed him to arrive at Nootka Sound first. As a result, "he engrossed the whole trade & ruined ours". Colnett believed that Barkley was "not Ignorant he had no right here", and sent Barkley a letter requesting to see "his Authority for trading in the Southsea Company's limits", but Barkley evaded the issue. Colnett wrote that he would take up the matter when he returned to England.

When Barkley left Nootka Sound and took Imperial Eagle south, trading in Clayoquot Sound, which he named Wickinninish Sound in honor of chief Wickaninnish. Farther south he entered a large sound and named after himself, Barkley Sound. He named one of the channels in the sound after his ship, Imperial Eagle Channel.

=== Discovery of the Strait of Juan de Fuca ===
In July, continuing south in clear weather, Barkley found the entrance to the Strait of Juan de Fuca. He did not explore it, but gave it its present name honouring Juan de Fuca. Juan de Fuca claimed to have discovered and sailed up a large strait at this location in 1592. Barkley thought the strait he found matched the description Juan de Fuca had given and that it was in fact Juan de Fuca's strait. The veracity of Juan de Fuca's claim had long been scoffed at by geographers and is doubted by most historians to the present day. Captain Barkley was probably the first non-indigenous person to find the strait. He was surprised to find it at all because Captain James Cook had previously explored the area and not seen it. Cook had emphatically stated that Juan de Fuca's strait did not exist. Frances Barkley wrote about the discovery in her diary: "In the afternoon, to our great astonishment, we arrived off a large opening extending to the eastward, the entrance of which appeared to be about four leagues wide, and remained about that width as far as the eye could see, with a clear easterly horizon, which my husband immediately recognized as the long lost strait of Juan de Fuca, and to which he gave the name of the original discoverer, my husband placing it on his chart." Barkley perhaps thought Tatoosh Island was the pinnacle reported by Juan de Fuca as located at the entrance to the strait. Fellow fur-trader Charles Duncan, who learned about the strait from Barkley, assumed the island was Juan de Fuca's pillar.

=== Destruction Island ===
Instead of sailing into the Strait of Juan de Fuca, Barkley sailed farther south along the coast of what is now the U.S. state of Washington. In September, Barkley anchored Imperial Eagle off a small island—probably today's Destruction Island, about 40 mi (64 km) south of Cape Flattery. Barkley sent six men ashore with the ship's boat to obtain fresh water, from the mouth of the Hoh River or someplace nearby. While the water casks were being filled a group of Hoh or Quinault Indians appeared out of the forest and killed all six men. Among the group was the purser, Beale, and the second mate, Miller. Barkley commemorated the event by naming the island Destruction Island and the river Destruction River. The Hoh people dispute this story. The river is now known as the Hoh River, but the island is still called Destruction Island. The attack near Destruction Island occurred about 30 mi (48 km) north of the site of a similar earlier attack. In 1775 the Spanish ships Santiago and Sonora, under Bruno de Heceta and Juan Francisco de la Bodega y Quadra, had anchored near Point Grenville. A party sent shore to collect wood and water was suddenly attacked and wiped out by a group of Quinault Indians.

=== China ===
After the attack near Destruction Island Barkley decided to sail for China. Imperial Eagle reached Macau in December 1787. The trade there proved very successful. Barkley was able to sell his cargo of about 800 furs for 30,000 Spanish dollars, resulting in a profit of £10,000, despite an overstocked fur market.

While in Macau, Frances Barkley's Hawaiian maidservant Winée left Imperial Eagle, being ill and wanting to return to Hawaii. In the spring of 1788 John Meares took her aboard Feliz Aventureira, which was sailing to Hawaii, but she died on the way. Meares described her as being "in a deep decline". Winée died on 5 February 1788 and was buried at sea.

== Confiscation ==
After selling his furs in China, Barkley acquired a new cargo and sailed Imperial Eagle to the island of Mauritius, then a French colony. While at Macau the ship's Austrian disguise was changed to Portuguese, and Imperial Eagle sailed to Mauritius under the flag of Portugal. Barkley was planning to sail to Calcutta, India, and outfit the ship for the second of three projected fur-trading voyages to the Pacific Northwest. In Mauritius he learned that the East India Company was taking legal action against the owners of Imperial Eagle for operating without a license. The various owners of the ship, including John Meares, decided to avoid trouble by breaking their ten-year contract with Barkley and selling Imperial Eagle. The partners managed to avoid blame and liability by leaving Barkley to take all responsibility. Charles and Frances Barkley stayed in Mauritius for over a year, during which time Frances gave birth to their first child. Eventually, in 1788, they sailed to Calcutta, India, where Imperial Eagle was confiscated.

Charles Barkley, who had invested £3,000 in the original venture and spent much of his own money on the ship, sued for damages. In an out of court arbitration settlement he received £5,000, a relatively small amount considering his large financial losses. John Meares managed to acquire possession of Barkley's nautical gear, his journal and log-book. Frances Barkley later wrote, "Capt. Meares, however, with the greatest effrontery, published and claimed the merit of my husband’s discoveries therein contained, besides inventing lies of the most revolting nature tending to vilify the person he thus pilfered." Other maritime fur traders such as George Dixon and Robert Haswell, condemned Meares for failing to properly credit Barkley's discoveries.

The Barkleys ended up stranded on Mauritius. They tried to return to England on an American ship, but it wrecked near the Netherlands. They finally reached Portsmouth, England, about two years after they left Ostend. Later both Charles and Frances Barkley returned to the Pacific Northwest in command of Halcyon.

== Legacy ==
According to Frances Barkley, she and her husband named various places after themselves, including a "very large sound to which Captain Barkley gave his own name, calling it Barkley's Sound. Also several coves, bays and islands in the sound we named. There was Frances Island, named after myself; Hornby Peak, also after myself; Cape Beale, after our purser; Williams Point and a variety of other names".

Trevor Channel, in Barkley Sound just east of Imperial Eagle Channel, was named by H.D. Parizeau in 1931, in honor of Frances Hornby Trevor, the young bride of Captain Barkley. There is also a Loudoun Channel in Barclay Sound.

== See also ==
- List of historical ships in British Columbia
- Nootka Crisis
