= Otterhampton =

Village in Somerset, England

Coordinates: 51.183°N 3.080°W

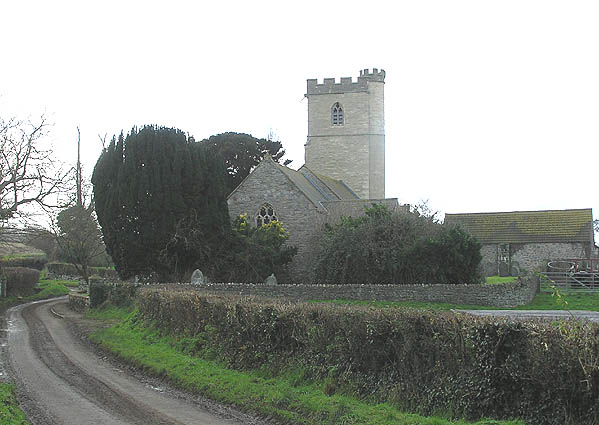
- All Saints Church, Otterhampton

- Location within Somerset
- Population: 831 (2011)
- OS grid reference: ST246431
- Unitary authority: Somerset Council
- Ceremonial county: Somerset
- Region: South West
- Country: England
- Sovereign state: United Kingdom
- Post town: BRIDGWATER
- Postcode district: TA5
- Dialling code: 01278
- Police: Avon and Somerset
- Fire: Devon and Somerset
- Ambulance: South Western
- UK Parliament: Bridgwater

Otterhampton is a village and civil parish in Somerset, England, between Bridgwater and the Steart Peninsula. The civil parish includes the larger village of Combwich and the small village of Steart.

== History ==
It was recorded in the Domesday Book as Utramestone meaning 'The outermost enclosure' from the Old English ultramest and tun. An alternative derivation is from the Saxon, meaning "place of Ottrane" the original Saxon thane.

Otterhampton was part of the hundred of Cannington.

The Steart peninsula has flooded many times during the last millennium. The most severe recent floods occurred in 1981. By 1997, a combination of coastal erosion, sea level rise and wave action had made some of the defences distinctly fragile and at risk from failure. As a result, in 2002 the Environment Agency produced the Stolford to Combwich Coastal Defence Strategy Study to examine options for the future.

== Governance ==
The parish council has responsibility for local issues, including setting an annual precept (local rate) to cover the council's operating costs and producing annual accounts for public scrutiny. The parish council evaluates local planning applications and works with the local police, district council officers, and neighbourhood watch groups on matters of crime, security, and traffic. The parish council's role also includes initiating projects for the maintenance and repair of parish facilities, as well as consulting with the district council on the maintenance, repair, and improvement of highways, drainage, footpaths, public transport, and street cleaning. Conservation matters (including trees and listed buildings) and environmental issues are also the responsibility of the council.

For local government purposes, since 1 April 2023, the village comes under the unitary authority of Somerset Council. Prior to this, it was part of the non-metropolitan district of Sedgemoor, which was formed on 1 April 1974 under the Local Government Act 1972, having previously been part of Bridgwater Rural District.

It is also part of the Bridgwater county constituency represented in the House of Commons of the Parliament of the United Kingdom. It elects one Member of Parliament (MP) by the first past the post system of election.

== Religious sites ==
The Church of St Peter was built in 1870 by J. Knowles for Susanna Lewes Jeffery, and has been designated by English Heritage as a Grade II listed building.

All Saints church, dates from the 14th century, and is now a Grade II* listed building. It overlooks the River Parrett. A church was established on the site in the 12th century, was valued at £5 in 1291, although the current building largely dates from the 14th. The perpendicular west tower was added later and has an Elizabethan bell-frame with 4 bells, one of which dates from the 16th century and two others are dated 1617 and 1737. The original dedication was to St Peter, however it was later renamed All Saints. The interior includes a Norman font with a Jacobean cover, a screen from the 16th century and 17th century communion rails. It is now in the care of the Churches Conservation Trust.
