= Destruction Island Light =

Lighthouse in Washington, U.S.

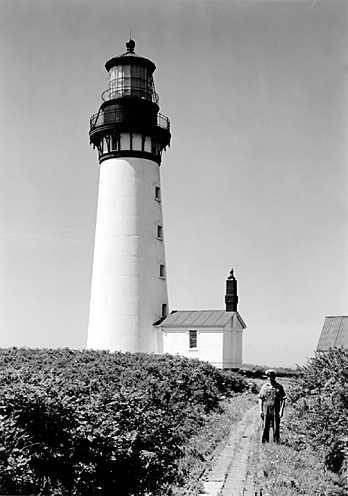
- Location: Destruction Island, Washington
- Coordinates: 47.6742°N 124.4869°W

Tower
- Constructed: 1891
- Automated: 1968
- Height: 94 feet (29 m)
- Shape: Conical

Light
- First lit: 1891
- Deactivated: April, 2008
- Focal height: 45 m (148 ft)
- Lens: First order Fresnel lens (removed)
- Range: 18 nautical miles; 34 kilometres (21 mi)
- Characteristic: White flash every 5 seconds

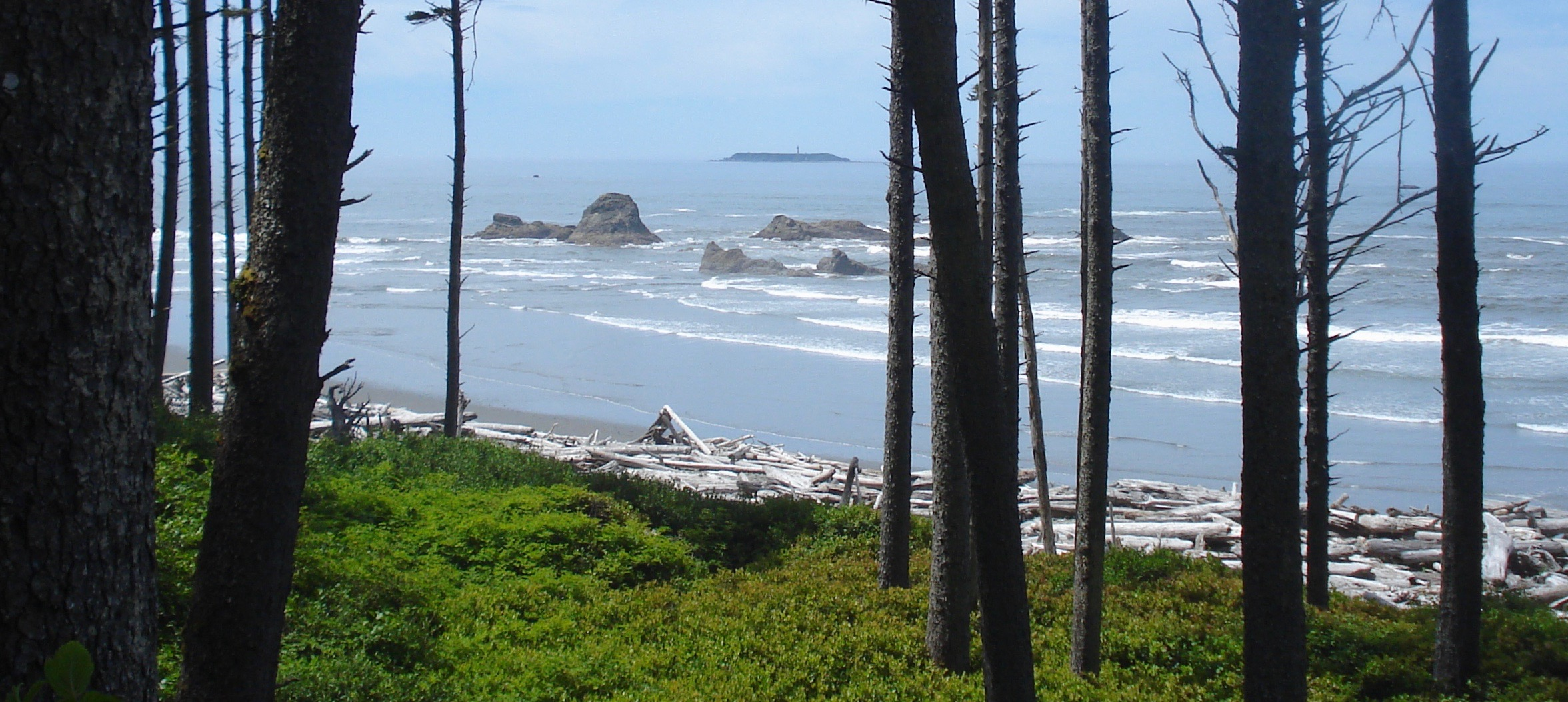
Destruction Island and its lighthouse as seen from Ruby Beach, Washington.

Destruction Island Lighthouse is a decommissioned lighthouse on Destruction Island, a rocky island that is part of the Quillayute Needles National Wildlife Refuge lying about 3 miles (4.8 km) off the coast of Jefferson County, Washington, in the northwest of the United States.

== History ==
Construction of the Destruction Island Lighthouse began in 1890. The island was proposed as a site for a lighthouse years earlier, but a shortage of funds and shifting priorities delayed the project. After the 94-foot (29 m) conical tower was complete, it was wrapped in a skin of iron to protect it from the elements. The fog signal was placed in operation November 1, 1891, and the five concentric wicks of the lamp were set afire on January 1, 1892. The tower's first order Fresnel lens stood 147 feet (45 m) above sea level and was visible for 24 miles (39 km). The Coast Guard assumed responsibility for the lighthouse in 1939; it was automated in November 1968. In 1963, the Coast Guard's attempt to turn off the beacon for good was scuttled by the protests of local boaters.

The Fresnel lens was removed in 1995 and is on exhibit at the Westport Maritime Museum in Westport, Washington. It was replaced with a Vega Rotating Beacon (VRB-25). At that time the use of the underwater power cable was retired to solar panels. The Coast Guard gutted the original fog signal building and developed it into temporary housing just in case weather prevented maintenance crews from leaving the island. The two keepers' dwellings are no longer standing. The only remaining companions to the lighthouse are two oil houses, the fog signal building and original water tower.

The Coast Guard shut off the light for good in April 2008. The structure is now under the management of U.S Fish & Wildlife, Quillayute Needles National Wildlife Refuge, and is closed to the public. The lighthouse is visible in the distance from U.S. Route 101 at Ruby Beach about 5 miles (8.0 km) north of Kalaloch.
