= Barkley Sound =

Sound on the west coast of Vancouver Island

- French: Baie Barkley
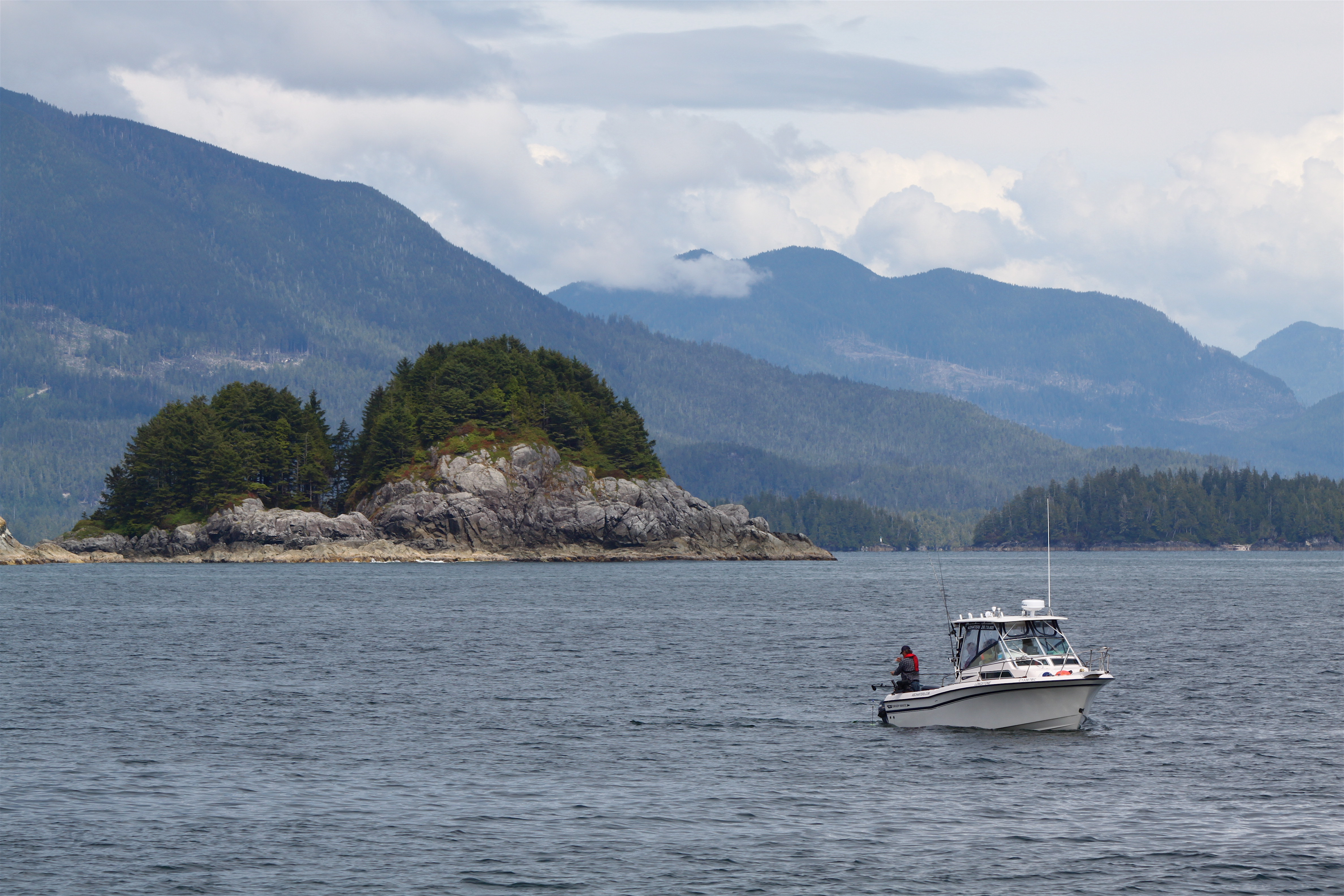
- Barkley Sound

- Location in British Columbia
- Location: Vancouver Island, British Columbia
- Coordinates: 48°53′56″N 125°16′28″W
- Type: Sound
- River sources: Sarita River, Effingham River, Toquart River
- Ocean/sea sources: Pacific Ocean
- Islands: Broken Group

Barkley Sound, also known historically as Barclay Sound, is south of Ucluelet and north of Bamfield on the west coast of Vancouver Island and forms the entrance to the Alberni Inlet. The Broken Group archipelago lies in the sound. Barkley Sound is part of the traditional territory of the Nuu-cha-nulth First Nations. In 1787, Captain Charles William Barkley of Imperial Eagle, explored the sound and named it after himself. Barkley traveled with his 17-year-old bride, Frances Barkley, the first European woman to visit what is now British Columbia.

In 1791, the Spanish ship Santa Saturnina, under Juan Carrasco and José María Narváez, explored Barkley Sound in detail. The Spanish named it Boca de Carrasco. Another Spanish name in common use at the time was Entrada Nitinat.

In 1933, 27 years after the sinking of SS Valencia, the ship's lifeboat #5 was found floating in Barkley Sound. Remarkably, it was in good condition, with much of the original paint remaining. The boat's nameplate is now on display in the Maritime Museum of British Columbia.
