= All Saints Church, Otterhampton =

Church in Somerset, England

All Saints Church
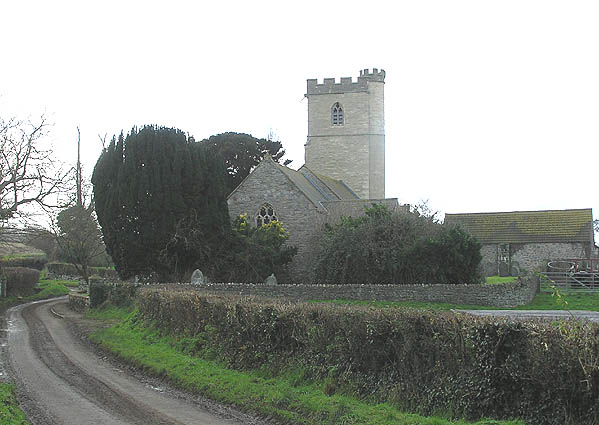

- Location within Somerset
- 51°10′59″N 3°04′47″W
- Location: Otterhampton, Somerset, England

History
- Built: 14th century

Listed Building – Grade II*
- Official name: Church of All Saints
- Designated: 29 March 1963
- Reference no.: 1344927

All Saints Church in Otterhampton, Somerset, England, overlooks the River Parrett. The church dates from the 14th century. It is recorded in the National Heritage List for England as a designated Grade II* listed building, and is a redundant church in the care of the Churches Conservation Trust. It was declared redundant on 1 March 1988, and was vested in the Trust on 2 August 1989.

A church was established on the site in the 12th century, was valued at £5 in 1291, although the current building largely dates from the 14th. The Perpendicular west tower was added later and has an Elizabethan bell-frame with 4 bells, one of which dates from the 16th century and two others are dated 1617 and 1737. The original dedication was to Saint Peter, however it was later renamed All Saints.

The interior includes a Norman font with a Jacobean cover, a screen from the 16th century, and 17th-century communion rails. It was closed in 1988, and is now in the care of the Churches Conservation Trust.

== See also ==
- List of churches preserved by the Churches Conservation Trust in South West England
- List of ecclesiastical parishes in the Diocese of Bath and Wells
