= Frances Barkley =

Frances Barkley (died 1832) was wife of Captain Charles William Barkley, who travelled with him. She is considered to be the first European woman to have ever visited Canada's west coast. Frances was the first woman to sail around the world without deception. Only two women are known to have sailed around the world before Frances: Jeanne Baré, disguised as a man, and Rose de Freycinet, wife of Louis de Freycinet, as a stowaway.

She was a daughter of John Trevor (1740–1794) and his first wife Jane Beacher. Frances was baptised at St Mary's Church, Bridgwater on 6 April 1769. Her father was said to have been a son of Robert Hampden-Trevor, 1st Viscount Hampden, by a Fleet marriage, the validity of which was not admitted. He was born 13 Aug 1740; admitted to Westminster School in October 1752; Edinburgh University. He was ordained 7 Jul 1771 and appointed Rector of Otterhampton, Somerset, from 8 Jul 1771. His first wife died in 1771 and he later remarried; John Trevor became Chaplain to the 4th (and last) Earl of Deloraine in 1776. He moved to the Continent and became Chaplain to Company of Merchant Adventurers, Hamburg Apr 1779 - Jun 1780; He was awarded a Doctor of Divinity degree on 15 Oct 1779. Then he became Chaplain of the English Church, Ostend, from Jan 1784. He died at Ostend on 28 Jan 1794.

Frances was educated at a Roman Catholic Convent, and left at 17 years of age, just before she met her husband
