= George A. Grant =

American photographer (1891–1964)

George Grant
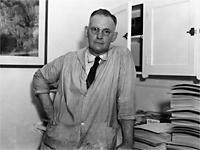
- Born: George Alexander Grant; March 4, 1891; Milton, Pennsylvania
- Died: 1964 (aged 72–73)
- Known for: Chief Photographer for the U.S. National Park Service

George Alexander Grant (1891–1964) was an American photographer who served as the first Chief Photographer for the U.S. National Park Service (NPS).

== Early life ==
Grant was born in Milton, Pennsylvania, on March 4, 1891, and grew up in Sunbury, Pennsylvania. After graduating high school, he had a series of manufacturing jobs before gaining employment in 1912 as a master craftsman and metalsmith at the Roycroft Community in East Aurora, New York. Roycroft was renowned for its craftsmanship of furnishings, fixtures, and other architectural pieces that were very popular during the Arts and Crafts Movement in the early 20th century. Following America's entry in to World War I in 1917, Grant enlisted in the Army. He was sent to Fort D.A. Russell in Wyoming for artillery training and remained there until war's end. Following his discharge he returned to Pennsylvania to work at a series of construction and factory jobs, all the time yearning to return to the West. In early 1921, he wrote a letter to the chief ranger at Yellowstone National Park inquiring about a position, but nothing came from the correspondence.

Upon learning that the park had a new chief ranger in 1922, he wrote again. This time the ranger, Sam Woodring, passed the information on to park superintendent Horace Albright. Both men liked Grant's resume, notably his experience in Wyoming during the war, and offered him a seasonal ranger position for the summer of 1922. It is unclear if Grant brought a camera with him to the park or located one after his arrival, but he began taking photographs and teaching himself how to process and print film. Superintendent Albright was impressed with his work and encouraged him to snap pictures when he was not involved in other duties. At summer's end, Grant was awarded a permanent ranger position. However, following a horseback accident, he realized that he was not suited to the strenuous demands of back country ranger work and there was not enough photographic work during the winter to justify his employment.

== Career ==
In early 1923, George Grant took photography courses in New York City and then accepted a position as a photographer for Pennsylvania State College (now Penn State University). He held the position for four years, also serving as an instructor in photography. During that time, he maintained a steady correspondence with Horace Albright seeking an opportunity to return to the National Park Service. In 1927, a position was approved for a Park Service photographer. Grant resigned from Penn State and drove to southern California to begin work. However, no funding was allocated for the position in the 1928 budget. In early 1929, Albright succeeded Park Service Director Stephen Mather who was gravely ill, and Hall located outside funding to support a photography position for 18 months. With those two pieces in place, George Grant was hired as the Park Service's first staff photographer in April, 1929, and was based at the NPS Educational Division headquarters at the University of California Berkeley. During his first field season, he traveled thousands of miles in a Park Service vehicle to produce photographs at more than a dozen national parks across the West and Southwest. In November 1929, he gave presentations on the value of photography in the parks to attendees of the first Park Naturalists Conference, held in Berkeley. In 1931, Grant was promoted to Chief Photographer and transferred to Washington, D.C. Grant remained a lifelong bachelor, but spent many holidays and vacations visiting his parents in Pennsylvania, and his younger brother who lived with his wife and three daughters in Snow Hill, Maryland.

Following the inauguration of President Franklin D. Roosevelt in March of 1933, Grant's workload dramatically expanded. In June, Roosevelt signed an executive order nearly doubling the size of the Park Service with the addition of many national monuments, historic sites, and national battlefields; at the same time, the establishment of the Civilian Conservation Corps (CCC) provided the resources and manpower to undertake dramatic improvements in state and national parks; and Grant was called upon to document many CCC projects in the national parks. He also accompanied teams traveling to different regions to survey for planned or proposed national parks. Among these were trips to the Great Smoky Mountains (1931), along the route of the planned Natchez Trace Parkway (1934), to southern Arizona and Sonora, Mexico (1935), to the Big Bend of Texas (1936), and to the North Cascades of Washington (1937).

Grant continued active work with the Park Service and the Department of the Interior until his retirement in 1954. Among his final projects was the documentation of historic sites and artifacts threatened by the rising waters of the Missouri River and its tributaries that were dammed as part of the Pick–Sloan Missouri Basin Program. After his retirement, Grant was recognized with a Meritorious Service Award from the National Park Service. After his death in 1964, he was further recognized as an "Eminent Photographer" by the Park Service.

=== Legacy ===
George Grant produced between 30,000 and 40,000 images during his year career with the Park Service. Of those, only 10% were ever published. His photographs have been featured in exhibitions, books, magazines, park brochures, and other documents.

Because of their significance to NPS history, Grant's images have been included in the National Park Service Historic Photograph Collection.

== Gallery ==
George A. Grant photographs for National Park Service

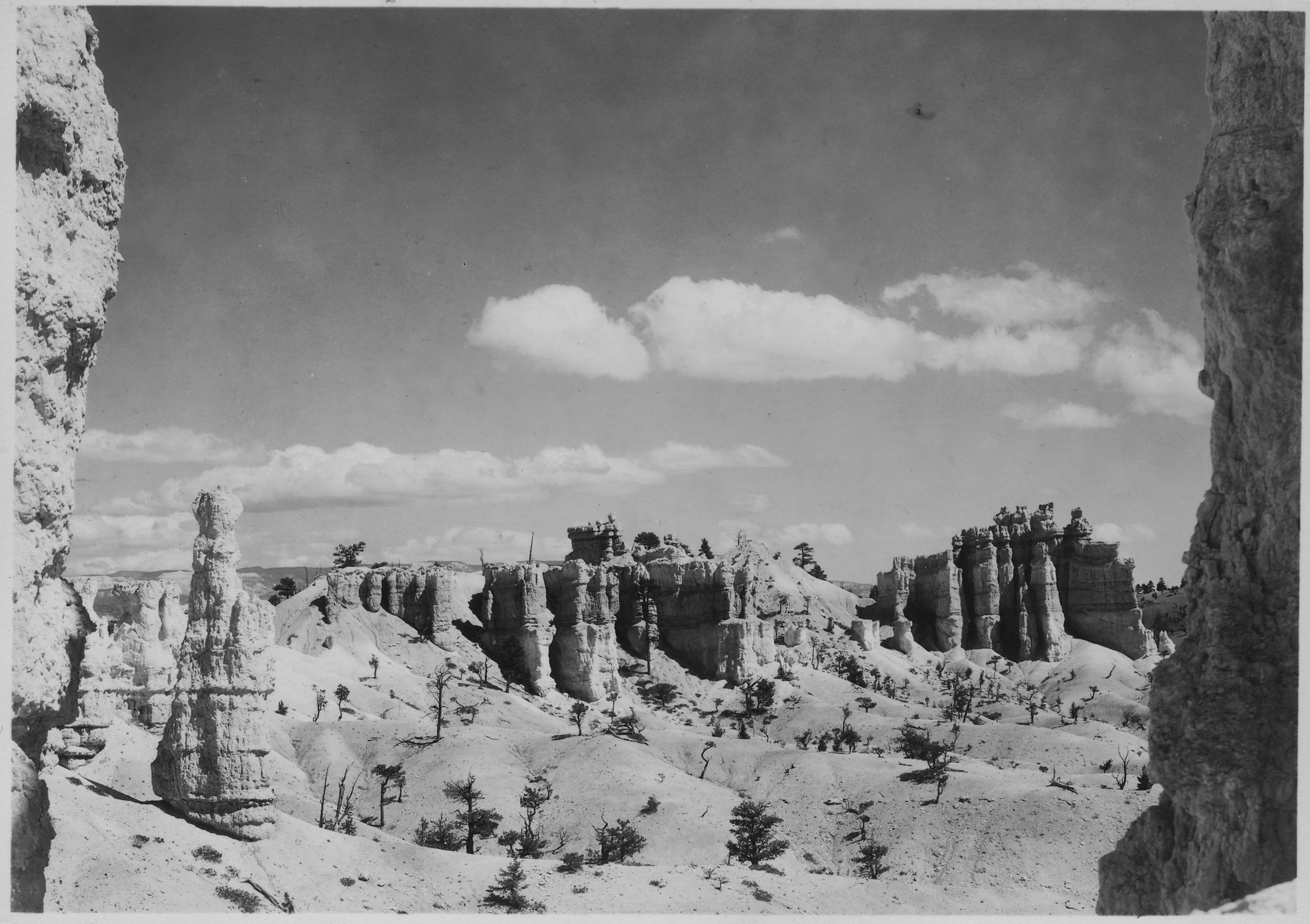
The Fairy Temple Group. Lot's Wife, Seal Castle, and Fairy Temple, 1929.

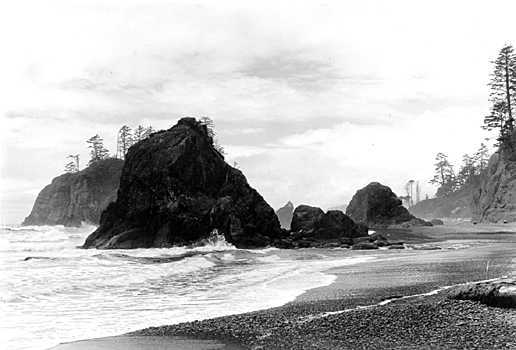
Near Olympic National Park, 1936

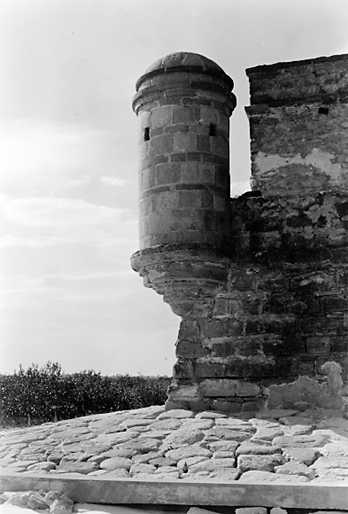
Fort Matanzas National Monument, 1937

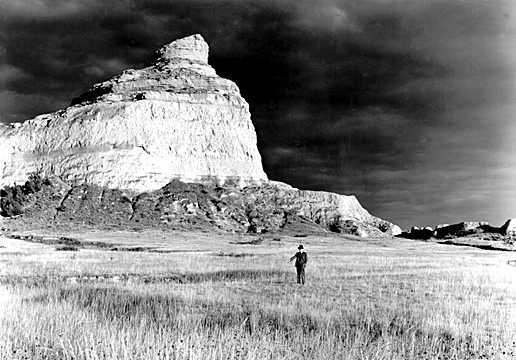
Scotts Bluff National Monument, 1938
