= Russell Sturgis (1750–1826) =

American merchant

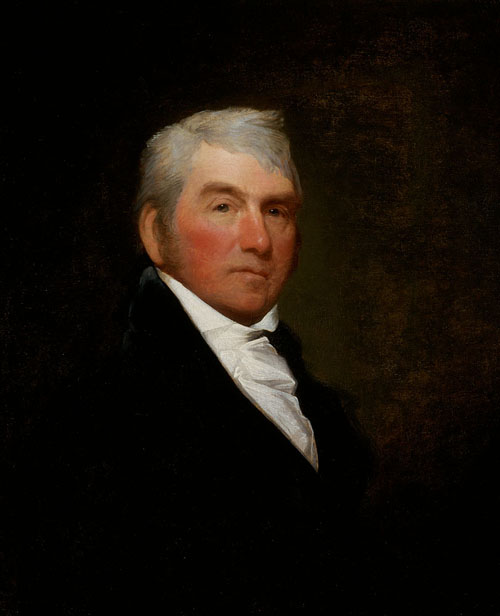
- Portrait of Russell Sturgis by Gilbert Stuart
- Born: August 27, 1750; Barnstable, Province of Massachusetts Bay
- Died: September 7, 1826 (aged 76)
- Relatives: Russell Sturgis (grandson); John Hubbard Sturgis (great-grandson); Thomas Handasyd Perkins (brother-in-law)

Russell Sturgis (August 27, 1750 – September 7, 1826) was a Boston merchant in the China trade.

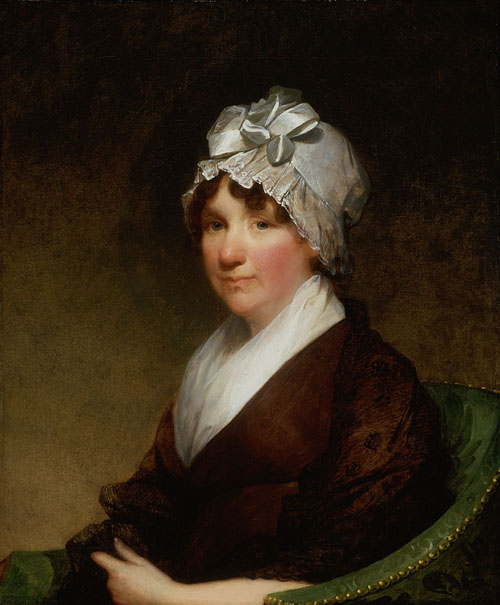
Elizabeth Perkins Sturgis, by Gilbert Stuart

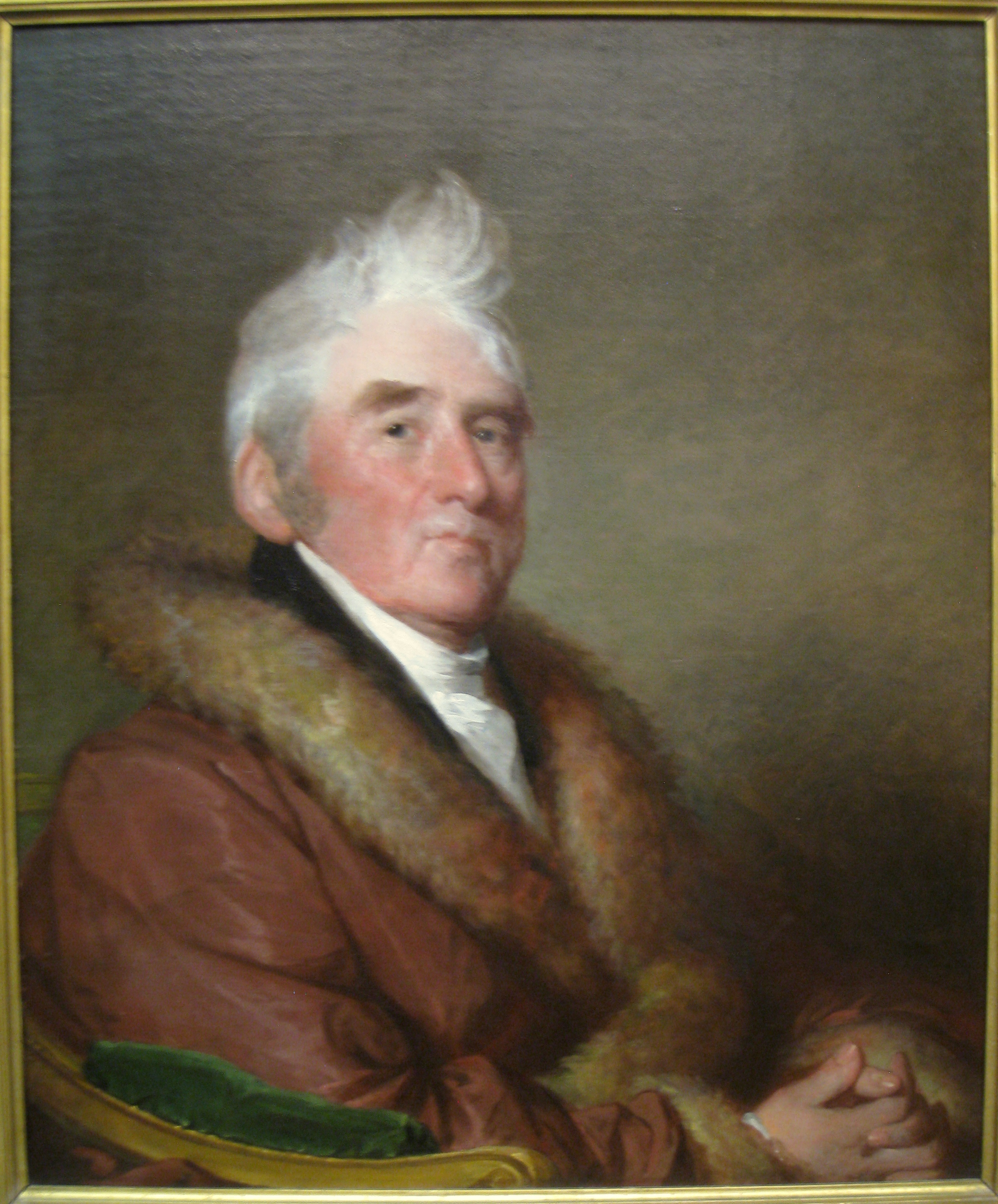
Russell Sturgis in 1822, by Gilbert Stuart

== Background ==
Sturgis was the second son of Thomas Sturgis Jr. (1722–1785), and Sarah Paine, of Barnstable, Massachusetts. He married Elizabeth Perkins (1756–1843), daughter of James Perkins (d. 1773), on November 11, 1773. Her grandfather was the Boston merchant and fur trader Thomas Handasyd Peck, under whom Sturgis apprenticed at age sixteen. Sturgis then worked as a hatter and furrier. Sturgis served as lieutenant of the Boston regiment of the Massachusetts militia in August and September 1778, and from 1787 to 1792 served under John Johnston as first lieutenant in Boston.

Sturgis's brothers-in-law, James Perkins (1761–1822) and Thomas Handasyd Perkins (1765–1854), were notable China traders. In 1795 Sturgis joined them in ownership of a new ship, the Grand Turk, which was sent to Canton in March 1796. When the Perkins brothers opened a branch office in Canton in 1803, Sturgis invested substantially, and three of Sturgis's sons —Henry Sturgis (1790–1819), who died in Macao; George Washington Sturgis (1793–1826), who was in Canton between 1810 and 1823; and James Perkins Sturgis (1791–1851), who arrived in 1809 and died on his voyage home— subsequently voyaged to China. In 1818, all three were involved in the opium trade as partners in the firm of James P. Sturgis and Company.

Sturgis was also active in Boston public affairs. From 1790 to 1796 he was a fire warden; in 1792 he was elected to a committee to assess a smallpox outbreak; and he served as Boston selectman from 1796 to 1797 and 1799–1802. He represented Boston in the Massachusetts state senate in 1801, and ran unsuccessfully as the Republican candidate for state senator in 1805.

Several portraits of Sturgis survive, including three by Gilbert Stuart, painted circa 1806 and in 1822. These portraits are currently in the Memorial Art Gallery of the University of Rochester, the Worcester Art Museum, and the Cape Ann Museum, respectively.

== See also ==
- Russell Sturgis (1805-1887), his grandson, head of Baring Brothers, London
- John Hubbard Sturgis (1834–1888), his great-grandson, architect
