= Spanish expeditions to the Pacific Northwest =

Research expedition

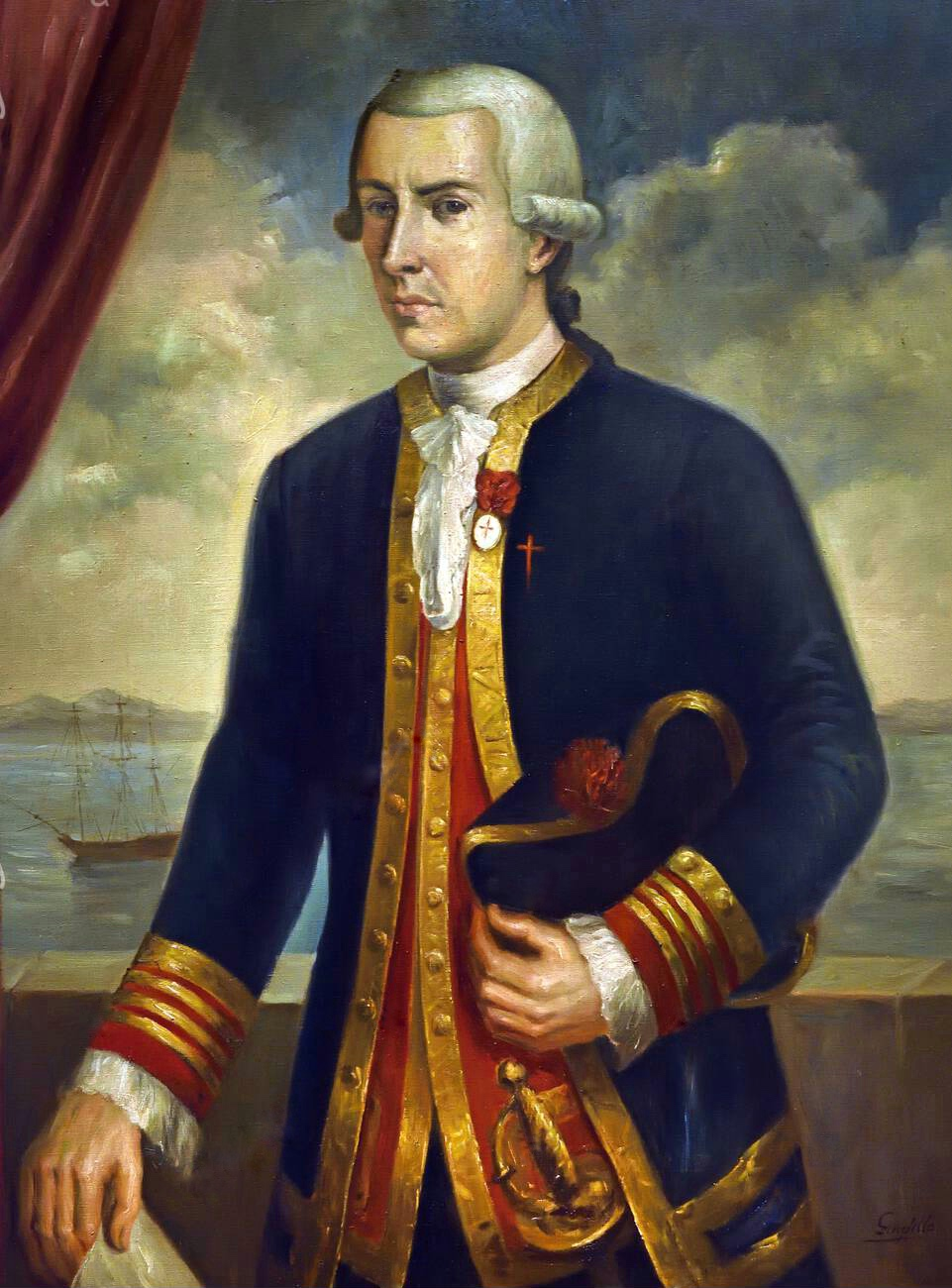
A portrait of Spanish captain Juan Francisco de la Bodega y Quadra, c. 1785. Bodega made several expeditions to the Pacific Northwest to chart the region and settle boundary disputes with the British.

During the Age of Discovery, the Spanish Empire undertook several expeditions to the Pacific Northwest of North America. Spanish claims to the region date to the papal bull of 1493, and the Treaty of Tordesillas signed in 1494. In 1513, this claim was reinforced by Spanish explorer Vasco Núñez de Balboa, the first European to sight the Pacific Ocean, when he claimed all lands adjoining this ocean for the Spanish Crown. Spain only started to colonize the claimed territory north of present-day Mexico in the 18th century, when it settled the northern coast of Las Californias.

Starting in the mid-18th century, Spain's claims in the Pacific Northwest began to be contested by the British and Russians, who established fur trading posts and other settlements in the region. King Charles III of Spain and his successors sent several expeditions from New Spain to present-day Canada and Alaska between 1774 and 1793 to strengthen the Spanish claims. These efforts would eventually come to naught when Spanish claims in the region were ceded to the American government in the 1819 Adams–Onís Treaty.

== 1774 voyage of Pérez ==
The first voyage was that of Juan José Pérez Hernández of the frigate Santiago (alias Nueva Galicia). Although intending to reach Alaska, the expedition turned back at Haida Gwaii. Pérez and his crew of 86 were the first known Europeans to visit the Pacific Northwest.

== 1775 voyage of Heceta and Bodega y Quadra ==
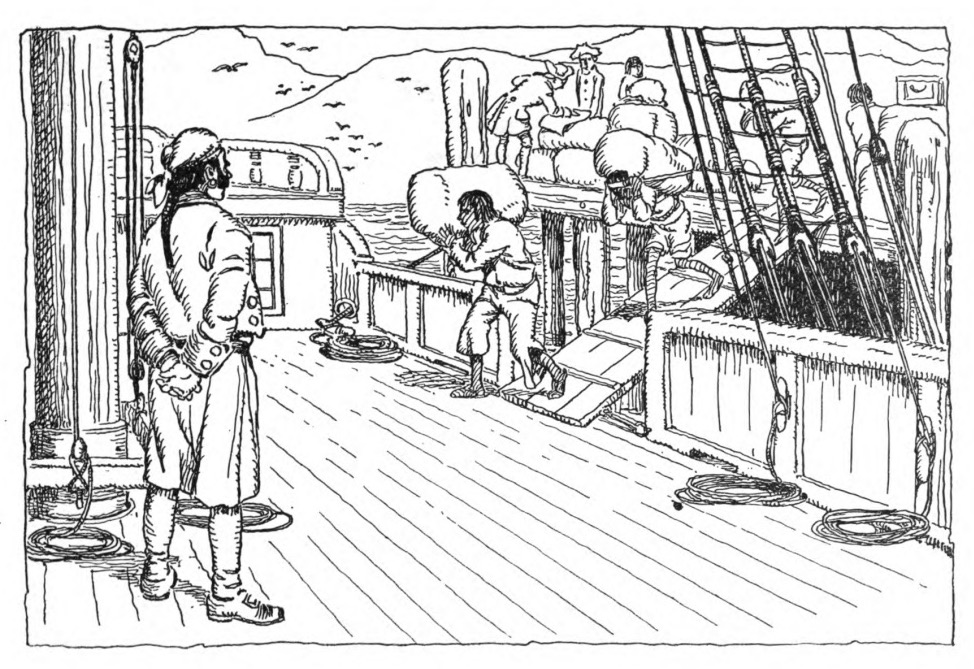
Loading the ship San Carlos. Illustration by Jo Mora.

In 1775, a second voyage of ninety men led by Lieutenant Bruno de Heceta aboard the Santiago, set sail from San Blas, Nayarit on March 16, 1775 with orders to make clear Spanish claims for the entire Northwestern Pacific Coast. Accompanying Heceta was the schooner Sonora, alias Felicidad, (also known as the Nuestra Señora de Guadalupe), initially under the command of Juan Manuel de Ayala. The 36-foot (11 m) long Sonora and its crew complement of 16 were to perform coastal reconnaissance and mapping, and could make landfall in places the larger Santiago was unable to approach on its previous voyage; in this way, the expedition could officially reassert Spanish claims to the lands north of New Spain it visited. Ayala took command of the packet boat San Carlos, alias Toysón de Oro, also sailing with the expedition, after its initial commander, Miguel Manrique, took ill soon after leaving San Blas. Heceta then gave Bodega y Quadra command of the Sonora. Francisco Antonio Mourelle served as Bodega y Quadra's pilot and the two forged a strong and enduring friendship.

The three vessels sailed together as far as Monterey Bay in Alta California. Ayala's mission was to explore the Golden Gate strait while Heceta and Bodega y Quadra continued north. Ayala and the crew of the San Carlos became the first Europeans known to enter San Francisco Bay. The Santiago and Sonora continued sailing north together as far as Point Grenville, named Punta de Los Martires (English: "Point of the Martyrs") by Heceta in response to an attack by the local Quinault Indians. The vessels parted company on the evening of July 29, 1775. Scurvy had so weakened the crew of the Santiago that Heceta decided to return to San Blas. On the way south he discovered the mouth of the Columbia River between present-day Oregon and Washington. Juan Pérez, who was serving as Heceta's pilot, died during the voyage south.

Bodega y Quadra, in the Sonora, moved up the coast according to the expedition's orders, ultimately reaching the latitude 59° north on August 15, and entering Sitka Sound near the present-day town of Sitka, Alaska. During the return voyage south Bodega y Quadra discovered, named, and explored a portion of Bucareli Bay on the west side of Prince of Wales Island.

During Bodega y Quadra's voyage numerous "acts of sovereignty" were performed. Many places were named by the Spanish, including Puerto de Bucareli (Bucareli Bay), Puerto de Los Remedios, and Mount San Jacinto, which was renamed Mount Edgecumbe by British explorer James Cook three years later.

== 1779 voyage of Arteaga and Bodega y Quadra ==
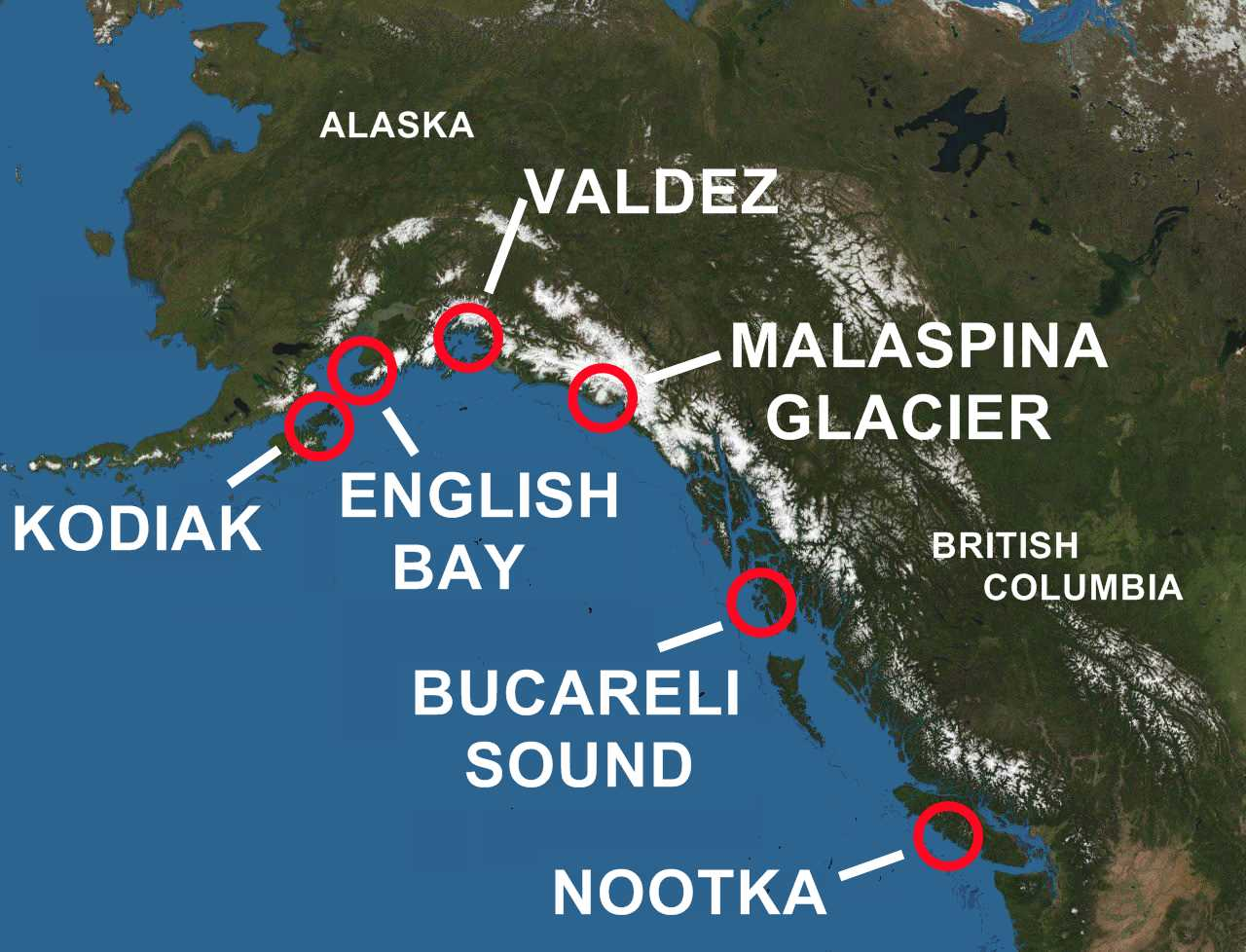
Areas of Alaska and British Columbia explored by Spain

A third voyage took place in 1779 under the command of Ignacio de Arteaga with two armed corvettes: the Favorita under Arteaga and the Princesa under Bodega y Quadra. With Arteaga on the Favorita was second officer Fernando Quiros y Miranda, surgeon Juan Garcia, pilot Jose Camacho, and second pilot Juan Pantoja y Arriaga. With Bodega y Quadra on the Princesa was second officer Francisco Antonio Mourelle, surgeon Mariano Nunez Esquivel, pilot Jose Canizares, and second pilot Juan Bautista Aguirre. The expedition's objective was to evaluate the Russian penetration of Alaska, search for a Northwest Passage, and capture James Cook if they found him in Spanish waters. Spain had learned about Cook's 1778 explorations along the coast of the Pacific Northwest. In June 1779, during the expedition of Arteaga and Bodega y Quadra, Spain entered the American Revolutionary War as an ally of France, precipitating a parallel Anglo-Spanish War, which continued until the 1783 Treaty of Paris. Arteaga and Bodega y Quadra did not find Cook, who had been killed in Hawaii in February 1779.

During the voyage, Arteaga and Bodega y Quadra carefully surveyed Bucareli Bay, then headed north to Port Etches on Hinchinbrook Island. They entered Prince William Sound and reached a latitude of 61°, the most northern point obtained by the Spanish explorations of Alaska. They also explored Cook Inlet, and the Kenai Peninsula, where a possession ceremony was performed on August 2, in what today is called Port Chatham. Due to various sicknesses among the crew, Arteaga returned to California without finding the Russians.

Throughout the voyage, the crews of both vessels endured many hardships, including food shortages and scurvy. On September 8, the ships rejoined and headed south for the return trip to San Blas. Although the Spanish were normally secretive about their exploring voyages and the discoveries made, the 1779 voyage of Arteaga and Bodega y Quadra became widely known. Lapérouse obtained a copy of their map published in 1798. Mourelle's journal was acquired and published in London in 1798 by Daines Barrington.

After these three exploration voyages to Alaska within five years, there were no further Spanish expeditions to the Pacific Northwest until 1788, after the Treaty of Paris ended the war between Spain and Britain. During the war, Spain dedicated the port of San Blas to the war effort in the Philippines. Voyages of exploration were suspended. Support of Alta California, which depended upon San Blas, was minimal. By 1786 Alta California had become nearly self-supporting and peace with Britain was restored, making further voyages to Alaska possible.

== 1788 voyage of Martínez and Haro ==
In March 1788, two ships were sent north from San Blas to investigate Russian activity. Esteban José Martínez, on the Princesa, was in command of the expedition, accompanied by the San Carlos under Gonzalo López de Haro, with José María Narváez serving as Haro's pilot. The ships arrived at Prince William Sound in May. Following evidence of Russian fur trading activity, the ships sailed west. In June Haro reached Kodiak Island and learned from the natives that a Russian post was nearby.

On June 30, 1788, Haro sent Narváez in a longboat to look for the Russian post at Three Saints Bay. Narváez found the post, becoming the first Spaniard to make contact with a large contingent of Russians in Alaska. Narváez took the Russian commander, Evstrat Delarov to meet Haro on the San Carlos, then returned him to his outpost. Delarov gave Narváez a Russian map of the Alaskan coast and indicated the locations of seven Russian posts containing nearly 500 men. Delarov also told Narváez that the Russians intended to occupy Nootka Sound, on the west coast of Vancouver Island.

After this meeting Haro sailed east and joined Martínez at Sitkinak Island. Using the information acquired from Delarov, the expedition sailed to Unalaska Island, where there was a large Russian post, also called Unalaska, under the command of Potap Kuzmich Zaikov. Martínez arrived on July 29, Haro on August 4. Zaikov gave Martínez three maps covering the Aleutian Islands. He also confirmed that the Russians planned to take possession of Nootka Sound the next year. Zaikov explained that two Russian frigates were already on their way and a third was to sail to Nootka Sound. He was referring to the 1789 expedition of Joseph Billings, but greatly exaggerating its mission. The visit to Unalaska marks the westernmost point reached during the Spanish voyages of exploration in Alaska.

The Spanish expedition left Unalaska on August 18, 1788, heading south for California and Mexico. Due to increasing conflict between Martínez and Haro, the ships broke off contact within three days sailed south separately. Martínez had allowed this but ordered Haro to rejoin him at Monterey, California. But during the voyage south Haro, with support from Narváez and the other pilots, declared his ship no longer under Martínez's command. They sailed back to San Blas on their own, arriving on October 22, 1788. Martínez spent a month in Monterey waiting for Haro. He arrived at San Blas in December, where he found himself faced with charges of irresponsible leadership. He soon regained favor and was placed in charge of a new expedition to occupy Nootka Sound before the Russians did. This expedition took place in 1789, culminating in the Nootka Crisis.

== 1789 settlement in Nootka Sound ==
Following up on the 1788 voyage to Alaska, Martínez and Haro were ordered to preemptively take possession of Nootka Sound. Events at Nootka Sound in 1789 led to the Nootka Crisis. During the summer of 1789 Martínez sent José María Narváez to explore the Strait of Juan de Fuca in the Santa Gertrudis la Magna (formerly the northwest America, a British vessel seized earlier by Martínez at Nootka Sound, later called Santa Saturnina). Narváez found the Strait of Juan de Fuca to be a large inlet with much promise for further exploration. By the end of the year, Martínez abandoned Nootka Sound.

== 1790 Spanish base in Nootka Sound ==
The Nootka Crisis became a major international incident nearly leading to war between Spain and Britain. As the process unfolded, the Viceroy of New Spain decided it was important to establish a permanent base at Nootka Sound. Three ships sailed to Nootka Sound, with Francisco de Eliza as the overall commander and captain of the Concepción. Manuel Quimper captained Princesa Real (the Spanish name for the British vessel Princess Royal, captured by Martínez in 1789). Salvador Fidalgo captained the San Carlos. The first colonial settlement in present-day British Columbia was built on Nootka Sound, Santa Cruz de Nuca as well as Fort San Miguel, manned by soldiers of the First Company of Free Company of Volunteers of Catalonia, under Pedro de Alberni. After getting settled, Eliza dispatched Fidalgo and Quimper on exploration voyages. Fidalgo was sent north and Quimper south.

== 1790 voyage of Fidalgo ==
In 1790, Spanish explorer Salvador Fidalgo took the San Carlos to Alaska, visiting and naming Cordova Bay and Port Valdez in Prince William Sound. He named current Cordova townsite. Acts of sovereignty were performed at both places. Fidalgo entered Cook Inlet and found the Russian post-Pavlovskaia, the Pavel Lebedev-Lastochkin Company post at the mouth of the Kenai River. Fidalgo did not stop at the post but continued west to Kodiak Island, where he noted Shelikov's post. Fidalgo then went to the Russian settlement at Alexandrovsk (today's English Bay or Nanwalek, Alaska), southwest of today's Anchorage on the Kenai Peninsula, where again, Fidalgo asserted the Spanish claim to the area by conducting a formal ceremony of sovereignty.

== 1790 voyage of Quimper ==
In 1790 Manuel Quimper, with officers López de Haro and Juan Carrasco, sailed the Princesa Real into the Strait of Juan de Fuca, following up on a voyage of Narváez the previous year. Quimper sailed to the eastern end of the Strait of Juan de Fuca, discovering the San Juan Islands and many straits and inlets. Having limited time he had to return to Nootka without fully exploring the promising straits and inlets. Contrary winds made it impossible to sail the small vessel to Nootka, so Quimper went south to San Blas instead.

== 1791 voyage of Eliza ==
In 1791 Francisco de Eliza was ordered to continue the exploration of the Strait of Juan de Fuca. The voyage consisted of two vessels. Eliza sailed on the San Carlos, with Pantoja as his pilot (master). Narváez sailed on the Santa Saturnina, with Carrasco and Verdía as pilots. During the voyage, the Strait of Georgia was discovered, and Narváez conducted a quick exploration of most of it. Eliza sailed the San Carlos back to Nootka Sound, but the Santa Saturnina, under Carrasco, failed to reach Nootka and instead sailed south to Monterey and San Blas. In Monterey Carrasco met Alessandro Malaspina and told him about the discovery of the Strait of Georgia. This meeting led directly to the 1792 voyage of Galiano and Valdés.

== 1789-1794 voyage of Malaspina and Bustamante ==
The King of Spain gave Alejandro Malaspina and José de Bustamante y Guerra command of an around-the-world scientific expedition with two corvettes, the Descubierta and Atrevida. One of the king's orders was to investigate a possible Northwest Passage. The expedition was also to search for gold, precious stones, and any American, British, or Russian settlements along the northwest coast. Arriving in Alaska in 1791, Malaspina and Bustamante surveyed the coast to the Prince William Sound. At Yakutat Bay, the expedition made contact with the Tlingit. Spanish scholars made a study of the tribe, recording information on social mores, language, economy, warfare methods, and burial practices. Artists with the expedition, Tomas de Suria and José Cardero, produced portraits of tribal members and scenes of Tlingit daily life. Malaspina Glacier, between Yakutat Bay and Icy Bay was subsequently named after Alessandro Malaspina.

== 1792 voyage of Galiano and Valdés ==
In 1792 Dionisio Alcalá Galiano, on the Sutil, and Cayetano Valdés y Flores, on the Mexicana, sailed from San Blas to Nootka Sound, then circumnavigated Vancouver Island. An account of the voyage of Galiano and Valdés, in contrast, was published in Spain and widely promoted, overshadowing the more significant voyage of Malaspina, who had become a political prisoner shortly after returning to Spain.

== 1792 voyage of Caamaño ==
Jacinto Caamaño, commander of the frigate Aránzazu, sailed to Bucareli Bay in 1792. Juan Pantoja y Arriaga served as his pilot. Caamaño conducted a detailed survey of the coast south to Nootka Sound on Vancouver Island. By 1792 much of the coast had already been visited by European explorers, but some areas had been overlooked, such as the southern part of Prince of Wales Island. A number of Caamaño's place names in the area have survived, such as Cordova Bay, Revillagigedo Channel, Bocas de Quadra, and in what is now called Caamaño Passage, Zayas Island (named for his second pilot, Juan Zayas).

No report on Caamaño's voyage was published until long after and his discoveries remained obscure, although George Vancouver apparently met Caamaño and obtained copies of his maps, especially of areas north of Dixon Entrance. Vancouver later incorporated some of Caamaño's place names into his atlas.

== 1793 voyage of Eliza and Martínez y Zayas ==
In 1793, Francisco de Eliza and Juan Martínez y Zayas surveyed the coast between the Strait of Juan de Fuca and the San Francisco Bay. They also explored the mouth of the Columbia River.

== Legacy ==
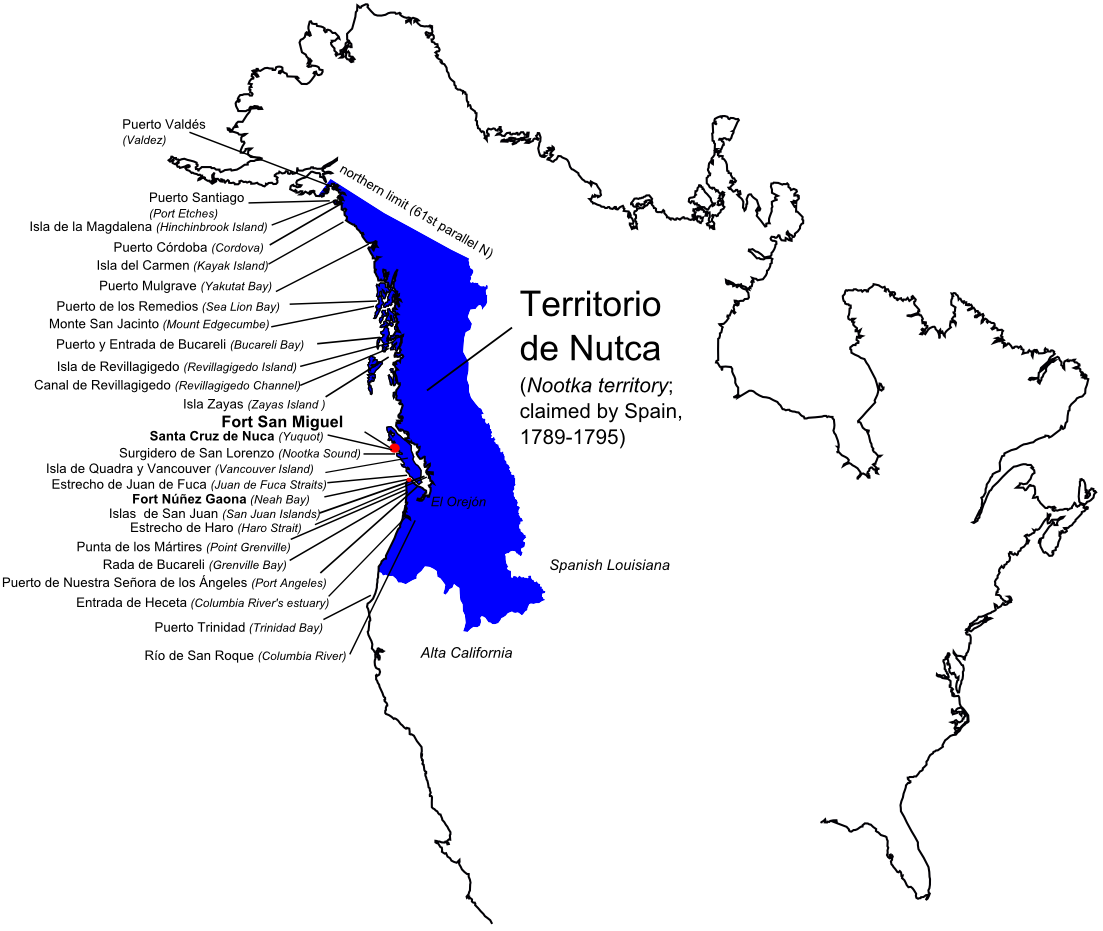
Spanish territorial claims in the North West Coast of North America, 18th century

After these numerous expeditions, Spain claimed the areas they explored as part of New Spain, calling this specific region Territorio de Nutca. The Nootka Crisis with Britain in 1789 and the subsequent Nootka Conventions caused Spain to decrease its presence in the North Pacific. It later transferred its claims in the region to the United States in the Adams-Onís Treaty of 1819.

The only Spanish official expedition to Nootka Sound after the conventions with Britain and before the treaty with the United States took place in 1796, when one of the ships from San Blas, the Sutil, made a stopover at the inlet. There they found Scottish activist Thomas Muir, then an escapee from Botany Bay prison, on board the American fur trading vessel Otter, and carried him to Monterey.

In 1957, the Spanish government presented stained glass windows commemorating the Nootka conventions to the church of Friendly Cove as a gift to the Nuu-chah-nulth people.

Today, Spain's legacy in Alaska and the Pacific Northwest endures as several place names, such as Ballenas Islands, Quadra Island, Fidalgo Island, Spanish Banks, Malaspina Glacier, Cordova Bay, Padilla Bay, Bucareli Bay, Sutil Channel, Cordero Channel, Laredo Sound, Haro Strait, Hernando island, Sonora Island, Cortes Island, Gravina Island, and Revillagigedo Island, or the towns of Zeballos, Port Angeles, Valdez, and Cordova.

== See also ==
- Fort San Miguel
- History of Alaska
- History of Canada
- History of Spain
- History of the west coast of North America
- Nootka Convention
- Nootka Crisis
- Russian America
- Santa Cruz de Nuca
- Spanish colonization of the Americas
