= José María Narváez =

Spanish naval officer, explorer, and navigator

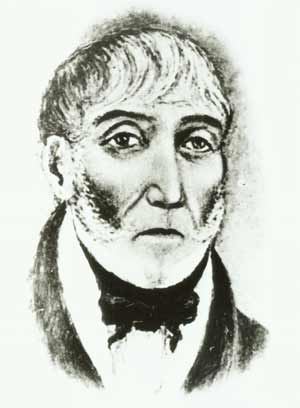
- Born: 1768; Cádiz, Spain
- Died: August 4, 1840 (aged 71–72); Guadalajara, Mexico
- Occupations: naval officer, explorer, and navigator

José María Narváez (1768 – August 4, 1840) was a Spanish naval officer, explorer, and navigator notable for his work in the Gulf Islands and Lower Mainland of present-day British Columbia. In 1791, as commander of the schooner Santa Saturnina, he led the first European exploration of the Strait of Georgia, including a landing on present-day British Columbia's Sunshine Coast. He also entered Burrard Inlet, the site of present-day Vancouver, British Columbia.

== Early career ==
Narváez was born in Cádiz, Spain in 1768. His parents were Juan Antonio Gachupin Narvaez and Vrsula Gervete. He was married on Oct 23rd, 1796 to Maria Leonarda Alexa Maldonado. He was admitted to the Royal (Naval) Academy for midshipmen in 1782. Within the year, he was at sea and engaged in naval combat.

In 1784 Narváez was sent to New Spain, where his first station was at Havana. For three years he served aboard supply ships working the ports of Veracruz, New Orleans, Mantanzas, Campeche, Roatán, and Trujillo. In November 1787, he was promoted to segundo piloto havilitado (qualified second pilot—piloto in Spanish being equivalent to master in English) and reassigned to San Blas, at the time the main Spanish naval base on the west coast of Mexico. He arrived in early 1788. Within the month, he sailed north as a pilot to Gonzalo López de Haro, commander of the San Carlos (el Filipino).

== 1788 voyage to Alaska ==
Responding to Russian activity in Alaska, the Spanish government began sending ships to investigate and assert sovereignty. The effort was based almost entirely out of the port of San Blas. In March 1788, two ships were sent north on reconnaissance, Princesa Real, under Esteban José Martínez, and the San Carlos (el Filipino), under Haro. Narváez sailed aboard the San Carlos (el Filipino) as Haro's pilot. The ships arrived at Prince William Sound in May. Evidence of Russian fur trading activity was discovered soon after.

In June Haro sailed the San Carlos (el Filipino) west to Kodiak Island. The Spanish traded with natives, who came to the ship in twelve canoes. The natives had slips of paper with Russian writing, apparently vouchers for payment, which Haro acquired by trade. He wanted the indisputable evidence of Russian commercial activity in the region.

On June 30, 1788, Haro sent Narváez in a longboat to investigate a Russian post at Three Saints Bay, Kodiak Island. Narváez found the post, becoming the first Spaniard to make contact with a large contingent of Russians in Alaska. The Russian commander, Evstrat Delarov, accompanied Narváez to the San Carlos (el Filipino). The Spanish gave Delarov a barrel of wine and other gifts. After returning Delarov to his outpost, Narvaez was given in turn a Russian map of the Alaskan coast, which included the locations of seven Russian posts, noting they contained nearly 500 men. Delarov also told Narváez that the Russians intended to occupy the port of Nootka Sound, on the west coast of Vancouver Island. After Narváez's return to the San Carlos (el Filipino), Haro and crew sailed east to rejoin Martínez at Sitkinak Island.

Using the information acquired by Narváez, the expedition sailed southwest to investigate Unalaska Island, where there was a large Russian post under the command of Potap Kuzmich Zaikov. Martínez arrived on July 29, Haro on August 4. Martínez and others went ashore and stayed at the post. He gave the Russians a supply of food and wine. Zaikov gave Martínez three maps covering the Aleutian Islands and confirmed that the Russians planned to take possession of Nootka Sound the next year.

Prone to bouts of abusive aggression, Martínez had continuing problems with his officers and sailors, including Haro and Narváez. While at Unalaska, Martínez had Haro temporarily arrested, during which time Narváez was in command of the San Carlos (el Filipino). Haro was restored to his command before the expedition left Unalaska on August 18, 1788. Within three days, the two ships broke off contact and sailed south separately. Haro's orders were to rejoin Martínez at Monterey, California. On the way Haro, with support from Narváez and the other pilots, declared his ship no longer under Martínez's command. They sailed back to San Blas on their own, arriving on October 22, 1788. Martínez, who spent a month in Monterey waiting for Haro, did not arrive at San Blas until December, where he found himself faced with charges of irresponsible leadership. Nevertheless, Martínez regained favour and was placed in charge of a new expedition to occupy Nootka Sound before the Russians.

== 1789 expedition to Nootka Sound ==
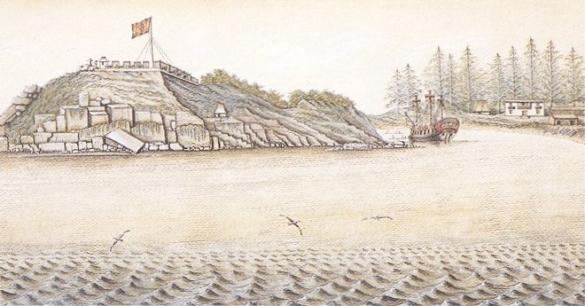
The fort of San Miguel, in San Lorenzo de Nutca.

Despite the bitterness between Martínez and Haro, the two were ordered to sail together in 1789 to take possession of Nootka Sound. Narváez again served as Haro's first pilot and second in command on the San Carlos. The two ships set sail from San Blas on February 17 and arrived at Nootka on May 5, 1789. Three merchant ships were already there, one English and two from the new nation of the United States. Three more English ships arrived during the summer, one of which was the Northwest America, built by John Meares at Nootka Sound the previous year. In his effort to assert Spanish sovereignty, Martínez seized the ship.

On June 21, Martínez dispatched Narváez in the captured Northwest America, renamed Santa Gertrudis la Magna (and later Santa Saturnina), to explore three inlets south of Nootka Sound — Clayoquot Sound, Barkley Sound, and the Strait of Juan de Fuca. Narváez sailed more than 25 leagues (about 65 miles (105 km)) into the Strait of Juan de Fuca. By this time only a few non-natives had entered the Strait, and none as far as Narváez. By early July he was back at Nootka Sound. His report to Martínez recommended Port Renfrew as a good anchorage.

While Narváez was away, Martínez performed an elaborate ceremony of possession at Nootka. Soon after he fought a brawl with the British Captain James Colnett, had him imprisoned, and seized several English ships and their crews. These events escalated into a major international crisis, known as the Nootka Crisis. Martínez forced a group of captured Chinese workmen to construct Fort San Miguel and other structures. Shortly after Narváez returned in July, Martínez captured a newly arrived English ship, the Princess Royal. This led to an incident in which the Spanish shot and killed Nuu-chah-nulth (Nootka) Chief Callicum, son of Chief Maquinna.

Martínez believed that the Strait of Juan de Fuca was the entrance of the legendary Northwest Passage and of great strategic importance. On July 27, Martínez placed Haro and Narváez in command of the San Carlos and the captured Princess Royal and sent them back to San Blas with the news. They arrived by the end of August 1789. In October, Martínez completely evacuated Nootka Sound and returned to San Blas with the prisoners and captured ships.

== 1790 reoccupation of Nootka ==
In late 1789 a new viceroy took charge of New Spain, Juan Vicente de Güemes Padilla Horcasitas. Together with Juan Francisco de la Bodega y Quadra, the naval commander of San Blas, Horcasitas made great efforts to enhance Spain's power in the Pacific Northwest. He sent another expedition to reoccupy Nootka Sound. Quadra loaded all the artillery he could find on the frigate Concepción, the San Carlos, and the captured English Princess Royal, which was renamed Princesa Real. Francisco de Eliza was given command of the Concepción and the expedition as a whole, and was appointed commandant of Nootka. Salvador Fidalgo was in command of the San Carlos, and Manuel Quimper of the Princesa Real. Martínez, now out of favour, went along as an unranked officer with no responsibility.

Eliza's three ships sailed from San Blas on February 3, 1790. In early April two more frigates joined the fleet—the Princesa under Jacinto Caamaño, with Narváez as pilot, and the Aranzazu under Juan Bautista Matute. This was the largest Spanish force sent northward up to that time. Eliza arrived at Nootka on April 4, 1790, and found no ships present. The Nuu-chah-nulth natives, alienated by the events of the previous summer, had moved to a more secure location. After reoccupying Fort San Miguel and other buildings, Eliza dispatched two exploration expeditions.

Fidalgo explored northward to Alaska on the San Carlos, while Quimper, with López de Haro and Juan Carrasco as pilots, explored the Strait of Juan de Fuca with the Princesa Real. Both ships were unable to return to Nootka and instead sailed to San Blas. Eliza would not learn of their discoveries until the following year. After these ships had left Caamaño and Narváez arrived on the Aranzazu. He would remain under Eliza's command for the next two years, participating in various voyages of exploration.

== 1791 explorations ==
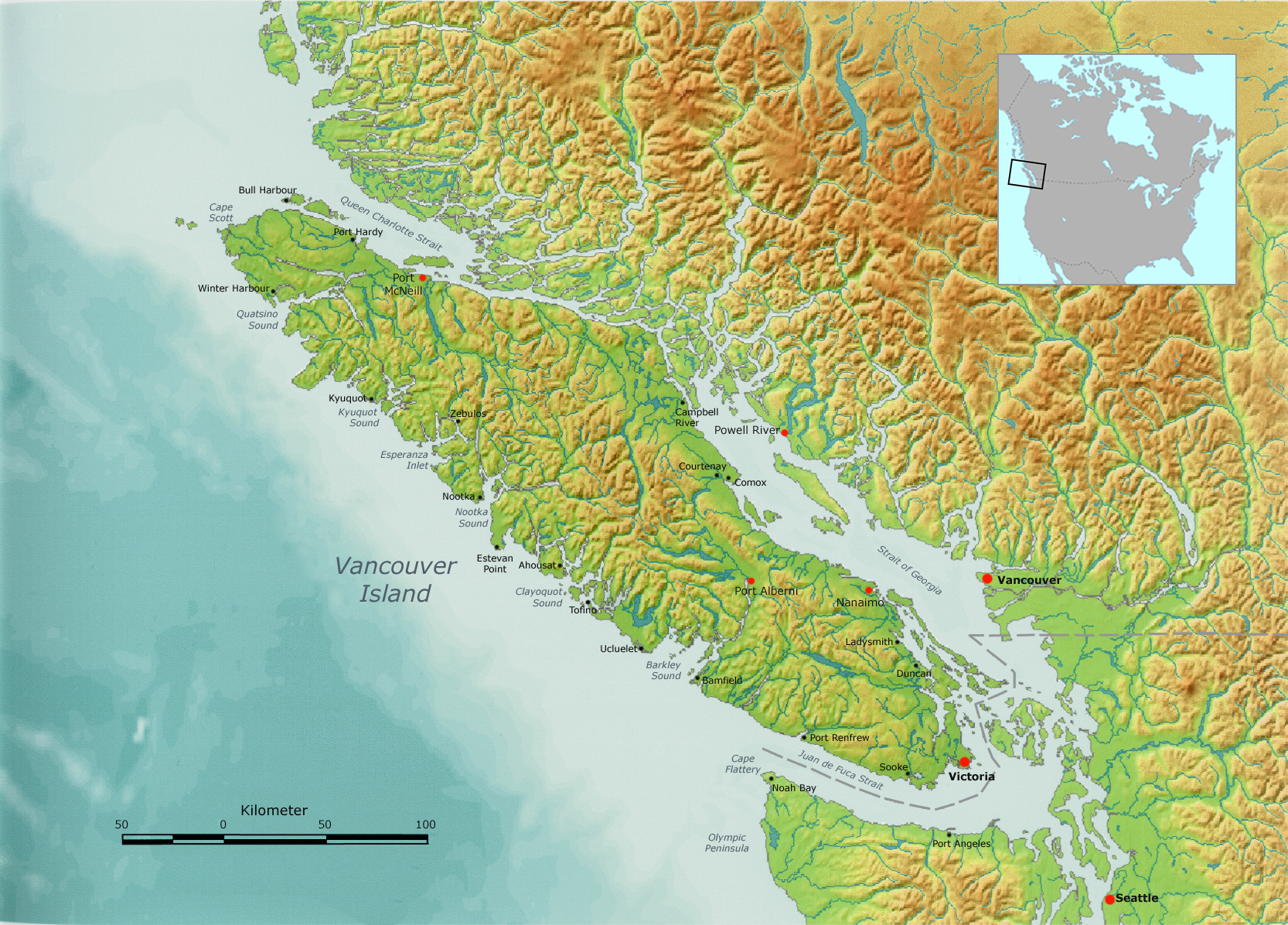
View of Vancouver Island, bordered in its southeastern part by the auas of the Strait of Juan de Fuca and the Strait of Georgia, complex waters that Narváez was the first European to explore.

By early 1791 several more ships and people had arrived at Nootka, along with instructions from Quadra to Eliza proposing further exploration of the Strait of Juan de Fuca. On May 4, 1791, Eliza set out in the San Carlos with the pilots Juan Pantoja and José Antonio Verdía. The latter had apprenticed under Narváez in 1788 and 1789. The San Carlos was accompanied by the schooner Santa Saturnina, nicknamed La Orcasitas. (It was originally the Northwest America, built by Meares at Nootka.) Narváez commanded the Santa Saturnina, with the pilot Juan Carrasco. The schooner was about 33 feet (10 m) long on the keel and of shallow draft. She had eight oars and carried about 20 days' supply of food. In addition, the San Carlos carried a longboat 28 feet (8.5 m) in length with thirteen oars.

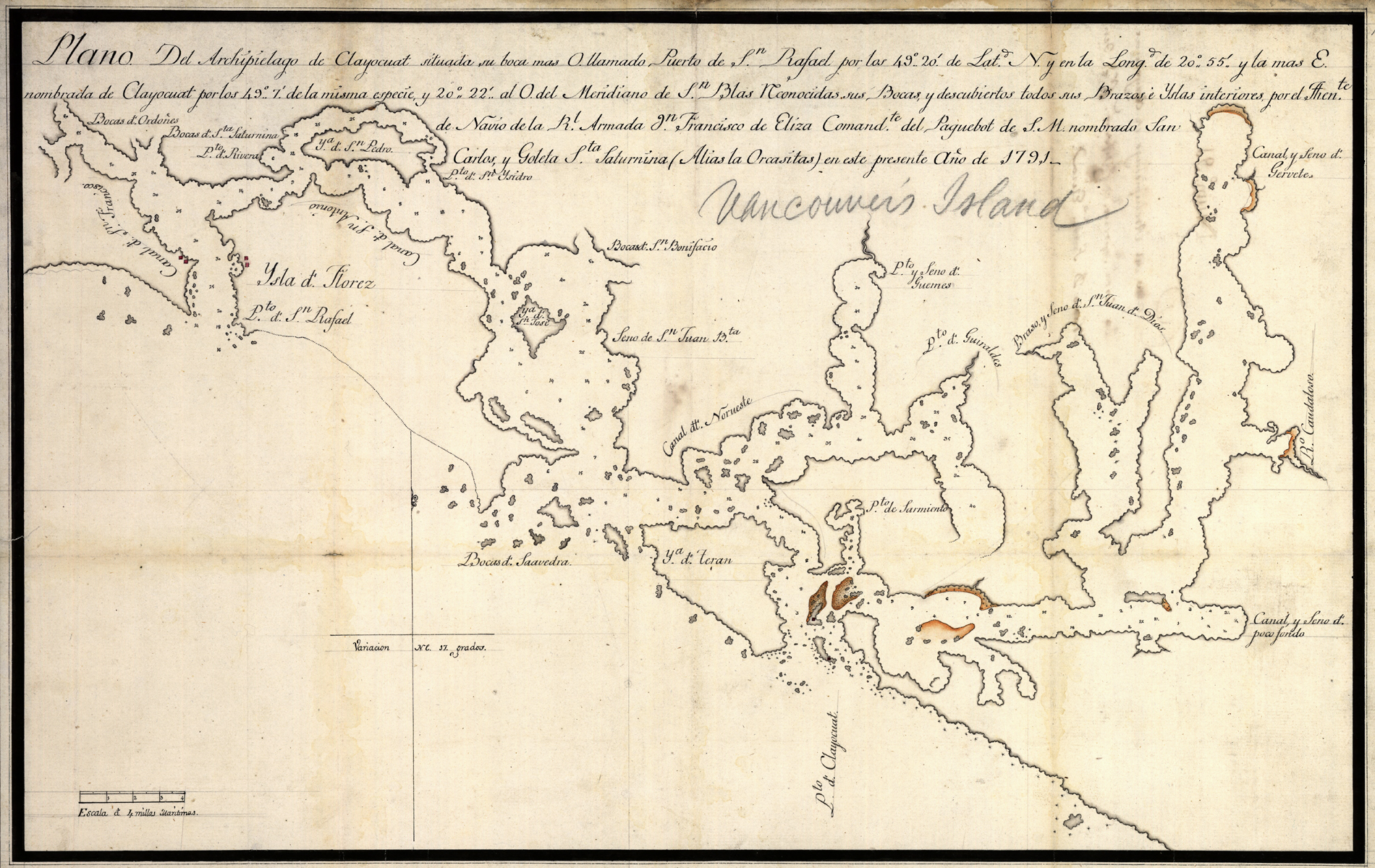
Map of Clayoquot Sound made during the 1791 exploration voyage under Francisco de Eliza

The expedition first stopped at Clayoquot Sound, staying for about two weeks. Narváez and Carrasco spent a week exploring the inner channels, and another week collaborating on a chart of the sound, which they called Puerto Clayucuat. While Narváez was busy with this work, Eliza made friends with Chief Wickaninnish. Eliza wrote that he was honoured with a dance of over 600 young men. Eliza also reported that there were five large indigenous settlements in Clayoquot Sound, each with over 1,500 inhabitants. The largest, which Eliza called Guicananich after its chief Wickaninnish, had over 2,500 people.

In late May Eliza, on the San Carlos, sailed into the Strait of Juan de Fuca to Esquimalt. The Santa Saturnina spent several weeks exploring Barkley Sound. The two ships rejoined at Esquimalt on June 14, 1791. In the Santa Saturnina, Narváez and Carrasco explored the inner channels of Barkley Sound, which they called Puerto de Boca Carrasco, and drafted a chart. According to Eliza's summary report of the voyage, Narváez saw five large settlements with "warlike and daring" inhabitants. On two occasions Narváez's ship was attacked by groups of about 200 men, but "he held them in check by means of some cannon shot." The natives "were surprised to see the schooner and, according to their explanations, had never seen a vessel inside."

In mid-June, with the expedition based at Esquimalt (which the Spanish called Cordova after one of their cities), Eliza instructed Pantoja to explore Haro Strait with the Santa Saturnina and the longboat. Assisted by Narváez, Carrasco, and Verdía, he entered the strait and passed between Vancouver Island and San Juan Island to reach Pender Island. Noticing several openings leading west and two leading east, they decided to investigate the larger of the two eastern ones, today called Boundary Pass. On June 15, 1791, they weighed anchor and sailed east along the southern shore of Pender Island and Saturna Island before entering "a grand and extended canal" — the open water of the Strait of Georgia, which they named Canal de Nuestra Señora del Rosario (Canal of Our Lady of the Rosary). This was the first time Europeans had seen the Strait of Georgia. The Spaniards believed they had found the legendary inland sea of the North American continent, and that it probably connected, somehow, to Hudson Bay or the Mississippi River. They spent the night anchored at Patos Island. The next day they sailed east to the vicinity of Lummi Island and the northern end of Rosario Strait. Out of food and exhausted, they returned the way they had come. With crew having to row against the wind, the longboat arrived at Esquimalt on June 24, and Narváez in the Santa Saturnina the next day.

Eliza moved his base of operations to Puerto de Quadra (present-day Port Discovery) on the south side of the Strait of Juan de Fuca. Eliza and the San Carlos remained there, while the Santa Saturnina and the longboat, under Narváez with Carrasco as pilot, set out to explore Rosario Strait and the Strait of Georgia more fully.

Narváez set out on July 1, 1791. Passing through Rosario Strait, which he called Canal de Fidalgo, Narváez surveyed Guemes Island (Islas de Guemes), Cypress Island (San Vincente), and Lummi Island (Pacheco), explored Padilla Bay (Seno Padillo) and Bellingham Bay (Seno Gaston), and anchored in Chuckanut Bay (Puerto Socorro), before heading north into the Strait of Georgia. He anchored in Birch Bay (Puerto del Garzon) and Drayton Harbor (Punta de San José), and sailed west across Boundary Bay to round Point Roberts.

Narváez thought Point Roberts was an island (Isla de Zepeda) and that the inland sea extended far to the northeast. Carrasco later made a map showing a large inlet called Boca de Floridablanca (also Canal de Floridablanca), which included Boundary Bay and extended north to about Burrard Inlet. After rounding Point Roberts, Narváez sailed several miles from the shore through the discharge of the Fraser River. He noted the water was "more sweet than salt", but mistook the land between the mouths of the rivers as low-lying islands in the imagined Boca de Floridablanca. He anchored off Point Grey, which he also took to be an island (Isla de Langara).

While at anchor off Point Grey, the ship was visited by a number of Musqueam men in canoes who traded food, water, and firewood for pieces of copper and iron. The Spaniards noted their language was quite different from that of the Nuu-chah-nulth (Nootka), with which they were familiar. The Musqueam indicated the Strait of Georgia continued north for a great distance. One of Narváez's crew bought a young native boy. From him the Spaniards learned that many Indians regularly came to the Musqueam on horseback, from a "flat country" in the northeast, to trade iron, copper, and blue beads for fish. The Spaniards did not visit the Musqueam village, but anchored 2 miles offshore. There they collected water from a large river (probably the north arm of the Fraser River). Narváez sailed some distance into Burrard Inlet, today the harbour of Vancouver. Carrasco's map shows not only the Musqueam village at Point Grey but another settlement at Point Atkinson (Punta de la Bodega), and another on the entrance to Howe Sound (Bocas del Carmelo), near present-day Horseshoe Bay.

Narváez continued north along the Sunshine Coast, anchoring off Mission Point in Sechelt and off Thormanby Island along the way, then rounded Texada Island before crossing to the west side of Georgia Strait and sailing past Hornby Island and Denman Island. His party named Nanaimo Harbour Bocas de Winthuysen. Sailing along Galiano Island and Valdes Island, Narváez noted and named Porlier Pass (today's version is Anglicized.) Narváez returned to Port Discovery on July 22, 1791.

At the start of his voyage, Narváez had passed by Admiralty Inlet (Ensenada de Caamaño), the entrance to Puget Sound. He planned to explore it upon return, but was running out of food by then and so returned directly Eliza's San Carlos in Port Discovery. Once resupplied with food from the San Carlos, he could have explored Puget Sound, but Eliza was eager to return to Nootka. The Spanish missed the opportunity to preempt British exploration of Puget Sound, which took place the following year under George Vancouver.

Eliza was impressed by Narváez's report on the size and nature of the Strait of Georgia. Because numerous whales had been seen in the Strait of Georgia, but few in the Strait of Juan de Fuca, Eliza correctly speculated that the strait had a second connection to the ocean. Eliza also came to suspect, again correctly, that Nootka Sound was not on the mainland, but rather on an island. Narváez had been unable to explore all of the Strait of Georgia. Although Eliza knew further exploration was important, by the time Narváez returned to Port Discovery, Eliza and many of his sailors were sick. He abandoned more exploration to return to Nootka. Eliza transferred Narváez to the San Carlos and gave Juan Carrasco command of the Santa Saturnina for the return voyage.

Sailing west, the ships found Port Angeles on August 2, 1791. They reached Neah Bay on August 7. From there the San Carlos, with Narváez on board, returned to Nootka Sound, arriving on November 9. Carrasco, however, was unable or unwilling to beat upwind to Nootka and instead sailed the Santa Saturnina south to Monterey, California, arriving there on September 16, 1791. Alessandro Malaspina was in Monterey at the time, having arrived five days earlier. Malaspina, a powerful figure of the Spanish navy, was thus the first beyond Eliza's crew to learn about the discovery of the Strait of Georgia. Malaspina immediately recognized the strategic importance of further exploration. Shortly after meeting with Carrasco, Malaspina sailed to San Blas and Acapulco. There he arranged for two of his own officers, Dionisio Alcalá Galiano and Cayetano Valdés, to take command of two ships to fully explore the Strait of Georgia.

As commander of the expedition, Eliza eventually received credit for most of the discoveries made during the 1791 journeys. Narváez commanded the ship and made the actual voyages of discovery.

== Mexican War of Independence ==
In 1810 rebellion broke out in Mexico, spreading rapidly and becoming the Mexican War of Independence. By the end of 1810, rebel forces had captured Guadalajara, the capital of Jalisco, with little resistance. Soon the revolt spread west into Nayarit, the location of the Spanish naval port of San Blas. After capturing the capital city of Tepic, by late November 1810, a rebel army led by Father José María Mercado was heading for the poorly defended San Blas. Numerous royalists and other non-revolutionaries had sought refuge at the naval base, where there was a military garrison and the chance to escape by sea.

Narváez arrived at San Blas on November 1, 1810, in command of the frigate Activo. Within days he was ordered by Commander Lavayen to arm the ship for war and supplies in case a retreat was required. The total force assembled at San Blas numbered a few hundred, mostly Spanish merchants and other elite peninsulares or gachupines who had fled the rebellion. By contrast, most of the townspeople favoured the rebels. The three naval ships were the San Carlos, Activo, and Concepción, in addition to two merchant ships and a number of smaller vessels. Numbering in the thousands, rebel forces surrounded San Blas and issued terms for surrender. On November 30, the commander Lavayen and the nine other naval officers decided to surrender. Narváez thought the Spanish position was hopeless. The next morning Lavayen capitulated and San Blas fell into rebel hands.

Within a month of the fall of San Blas, the revolutionaries suffered severe defeat near Guadalajara. In the aftermath, the royalist army regained control of Tepic and San Blas, among other areas. In February 1811 Narváez, Lavayen, and nine other officers were brought before a military tribunal, on charges of having failed to defend San Blas. All the officers were found guilty of treason, but they were cleared of most of the charges and restored to duty. Continuing to serve the Spanish Navy, Narváez made repeated attempts to remove the stain on his reputation.

As a native of Spain, Narváez was classified as a member of the elite colonial class known as peninsulares (meaning from the Spanish peninsula) or gachupines. Having made Mexico his home, he became increasingly interested in the goals of the revolutionary movement. Insurgents repeatedly raised revolt and violence in various regions. Overall Narváez remained a royalist and continued to serve the navy. He was put in charge of a roundtrip voyage to the Philippines, then under Spanish rule, in 1813-1814.

In 1815 Narváez took part in a blockade of the rebel stronghold of Mescala Island in Lake Chapala, near Guadalajara. Royalist forces attempted and failed to take Mescala Island at least four times, taking significant losses in the process. The Spanish commander was Brigadier José de la Cruz, who had also led the military tribunal that found Narváez guilty of treason in 1811. Having failed to take Mescala Island, Cruz conducted a "scorched earth" campaign around the entire lake. Late in 1816 the rebels on Mescala Island finally surrendered.

During 1817 and early 1818 Narváez was mapping the province of Jalisco, including charting Lake Chapala. He also surveyed a new road to Guadalajara. On March 20, 1818, he was promoted to alférez de navio in recognition of his service during the Lake Chapala campaign.

By 1818 royalist forces had pacified nearly all of New Spain, and the revolutionary movement collapsed. In 1821, however, the young royalist captain Agustín de Iturbide formed a partnership with the rebel General Vicente Guerrero. They created a common army and within the year marched into Mexico City and proclaimed independence.

== Mexican Navy ==
With the end of Spanish rule, Narváez decided to remain in Guadalajara with his family. He accepted retirement from the Spanish Navy. In 1821 he was elected Guadalajara's Provincial Deputy to the new Mexican government under Iturbide. When the Mexican Navy was created in late 1821, Narváez was appointed teniente de fragata (frigate lieutenant, a rank higher than Narváez was likely to have achieved in the Spanish Navy).

In 1822 Narváez was given command of the San Carlos. He sailed from San Blas to Baja California and Alta California on a mission to install Mexican commissions and councils in both provinces. By the time he returned to San Blas in March 1823, Iturbide had been overthrown. A new government was set up under Antonio López de Santa Anna. Narváez was appointed Commandant of the Department of San Blas, a position he kept until 1827 when the post was suspended due to funding cuts.

In 1824 and 1825 Narváez was given command of the Mexicana to survey and map the coast between the ports of San Blas and Manzanillo. In April 1825 he was promoted to capitán de fragata. Later that year, he created maps of the border areas between Louisiana and Texas for the government. In 1826 he became a founding member of an Institute of Science, Literature, and the Arts in Mexico.

After 1827 Narváez's naval position was eliminated, but he continued to work for the Mexican Navy in various capacities, including making numerous maps. He retired in 1831 at the age of 63 and settled in Guadalajara, where he lived on a meager pension. In retirement he continued to make maps, including the first official map of the state of Jalisco.

== Death ==
Narváez died on August 4, 1840, in Guadalajara, Mexico. His date of birth varied in the historical record. Late-twentieth-century historian Jim McDowell musters supporting documentation for settling on 1768.

== Memorials ==
To mark 150 years after the embarkation of his 1791 expeditions to the Georgia Strait, the Lions Club of West Vancouver erected a stone cairn at Ambleside Beach with a plaque memorialising Narváez as "the first white man to visit the mainland of Western Canada".

In January 2009, the District Municipality of Sechelt (on British Columbia's Sunshine Coast) erected an historical marker to honour the explorations of Narváez in Georgia Strait in 1791. It is at the south end of the Davis Bay seawall, near the spot where he became the first European explorer to set foot on the mainland coast of present-day British Columbia.
