= La Princesa =

Spanish frigate

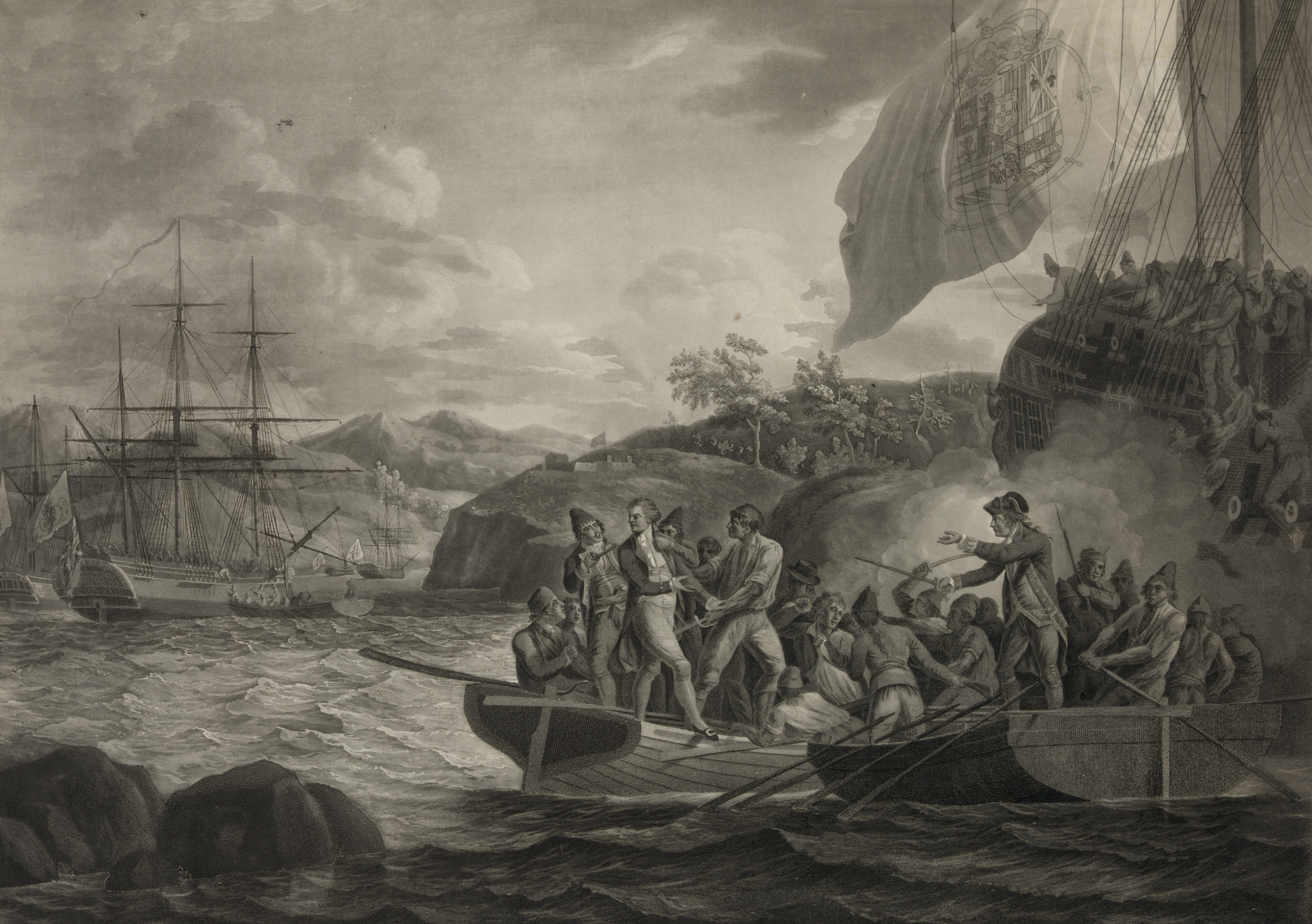
- Martínez takes Colnett prisoner in 1789, La Princesa, far right in the picture

History

Spain
- Name: La Princesa
- Builder: San Blas Shipyards
- Laid down: 1777
- Launched: 1778

General characteristics
- Class & type: Frigate or corvette
- Tons burthen: 189
- Propulsion: Sails
- Sail plan: Full-rigged ship
- Complement: 98
- Armament: 6 x 4 pounds (1.8 kg) cannons, 4 x 3 pounds (1.4 kg) cannons (1779); 26 cannons (1789)

La Princesa (also called Princesa, also known as Nuestra Señora del Rosario) was a warship of the Spanish Navy built at the Spanish naval base at San Blas and launched in 1778. She is sometimes called a frigate and sometimes a corvette. At the time a corvette was similar to a frigate in that both were three-masted, ship-rigged warships, but corvettes were slightly smaller and had a single deck instead of two. The exact specifications of La Princesa are not known. La Princesa was designed with storage enough to sail for a year without having to restock.

She was built for durability rather than speed. Like La Favorita, a similar corvette stationed at San Blas, La Princesa was heavily used, serving for over three decades, playing an important role in the exploration of the Pacific Northwest as well as the routine work of provisioning the missions of Alta California. During her 1779 voyage the Princesa carried six four-pounder cannons and four three-pounders, and had a crew complement of 98. The Princesa carried 26 cannons in 1789 when Esteban José Martínez took control of Nootka Sound.

== 1779 voyage to Alaska ==
In 1779 the Princesa took part in a voyage from San Blas, Mexico, to Alaska. The expedition was under the command of Ignacio de Arteaga on the Favorita. Juan Francisco de la Bodega y Quadra was given command of the Princesa. With Bodega y Quadra on the Princesa was second officer Francisco Antonio Mourelle, surgeon Mariano Nunez Esquivel, pilot Jose Canizares, and second pilot Juan Bautista Aguirre.

The expedition's objective was to evaluate the Russian penetration of Alaska, search for a Northwest Passage, and capture James Cook if they found him in Spanish waters. Spain had learned about Cook's 1778 explorations along the coast of the Pacific Northwest. In June 1779, during the expedition of Arteaga and Bodega y Quadra, Spain entered the American Revolutionary War as an ally of France, precipitating a parallel Anglo-Spanish War, which continued until the 1783 Treaty of Paris. Arteaga and Bodega y Quadra did not find Cook, who had been killed in Hawaii in February 1779.

During the voyage Arteaga and Bodega y Quadra carefully surveyed Bucareli Bay then headed north to Port Etches on Hinchinbrook Island, near the entrance to Prince William Sound. There Arteaga took a party ashore to perform a formal ceremony of possession. This was the northernmost point at which Spain performed such a formal ceremony and became the foundation of Spain's claims of sovereignty north to the latitude of 61° north.

Arteaga and Bodega y Quadra also explored Cook Inlet, and the Kenai Peninsula, where a possession ceremony was performed on August 2, 1779, in what today is called Port Chatham. Due to various sicknesses among the crew, Arteaga decided to return south. On September 8, the ships rejoined and began the return trip to San Blas. Although the Spanish were normally secretive about their exploring voyages and the discoveries made, the 1779 voyage of Arteaga and Bodega y Quadra became widely known. La Perouse obtained a copy of their map, which was published in 1798. Mourelle's journal was acquired and published in London in 1798 by Daines Barrington.

== Wartime activities ==
While Spain was at war with Britain during the early 1780 the San Blas Naval Base was devoted to the defense of the Philippines. In 1780 Francisco Antonio Mourelle sailed the Princesa to Manila for this purpose. He returned to San Blas in 1781. By the middle 1780s the supply of Alta California was given increased priority. Esteban José Martínez sailed the Princesa to Monterey several times in the early 1780s.

== 1788 voyage to Alaska ==
In March, 1788, two ships were sent north from San Blas to further investigate Russian activity. Esteban José Martínez, the expedition commander, sailed on La Princesa. The packet ship San Carlos, under Gonzalo López de Haro with pilot José María Narváez accompanied Martínez. The ships arrived at Prince William Sound in May. Following evidence of Russian fur trading activity the ships sailed west. In June Haro and Narváez made contact with the Russians at the post at Three Saints Bay on Kodiak Island. Afterwards Haro sailed east to rejoin Martínez at Sitkinak Island. Using the information acquired at Three Saints Bay, the two ships sailed to Unalaska Island, where there was a large Russian post, also called Unalaska, under the command of Potap Kuzmich Zaikov. La Princesa under Martínez arrived on July 29. Haro's San Carlos arrived on August 4. Zaikov gave Martínez three maps covering the Aleutian Islands. He also confirmed that the Russians planned to take possession of Nootka Sound, a key harbor on the west coast of Vancouver Island, the next year. The visit to Unalaska marks the westernmost point reached during the Spanish voyages of exploration in Alaska.

The two ships left Unalaska on August 18, 1788, and headed south for California and Mexico. Due to increasing conflict between Martínez and Haro contact was broken off within three days and the two ships sailed south separately. Martínez had allowed this but ordered Haro to rejoin him at Monterey, California. During the voyage south, however, Haro, with support from Narváez and the other pilots, declared his ship no longer under Martínez's command. They sailed the San Carlos back to San Blas on their own, arriving on October 22, 1788. Martínez and La Princesa spent a month in Monterey waiting for Haro. He arrived at San Blas in December, where he found himself faced with charges of irresponsible leadership. He soon regained favor and was placed in charge of a new expedition to occupy Nootka Sound before the Russians did.

== 1789 occupation of Nootka Sound ==
Martínez was given command of La Princesa with orders to take possession of Nootka Sound. Sailing from San Blas he arrived at Nootka on May 6, 1789. He quickly landed artillery and materials for the construction of Fort San Miguel. About a week later the San Carlos arrived, under Haro. The crews of the two ships were nearly identical to those aboard the previous year. In addition the ships carried 28 soldiers of the Free Company of Volunteers of Catalonia. British ships were already present when Martínez arrived, and more came during the summer. Conflict broke out between Martínez and the British, setting in motion a series of events known as the Nootka Crisis, which nearly led to war between Britain and Spain.

== 1792 occupation of Neah Bay ==
In 1792 Salvador Fidalgo was assigned to establish a Spanish post at Neah Bay (the Spanish name was Bahía de Núñez Gaona), on the southwestern coast of the Strait of Juan de Fuca in present-day U.S. state of Washington. He was given command of La Princesa and, sailing from San Blas, arrived at Neah Bay on May 28, 1792. Work on the post began and soon land had been cleared for a garden, a livestock enclosure with a number of cows, sheep, hogs, and goats, and a stockade with a small garrison. La Princesa remained at Neah Bay during the work in order to provide protection.

During the autumn of 1792 a conflict occurred between the Makah, natives of Neah Bay, and the Spanish. Fidalgo's second in command, Antonio Serantes, was killed and in retaliation Fidalgo had many Makah killed. For this action Fidalgo was severely reprimanded by his superior officers. The post at Neah Bay was abandoned and Fidalgo was recalled to Nootka Sound.

== Final voyages to the Pacific Northwest ==
The Princesa made several further voyages to Nootka Sound between 1792 and 1794, as the formalities of the Nootka Conventions were addressed. The last such voyage was in the summer of 1794, when Fidalgo carried José Manuel de Álava, the new Commandant of San Blas following the death of Bodega y Quadra, on the Princesa from San Blas to Nootka Sound. The formalities resolving the Nootka Crisis between Spain and Britain, initiated by Bodega y Quadra and George Vancouver, were finalized by Álava and Vancouver.

== See also ==
- List of historical ships in British Columbia
- Princess Royal

== Bibliography ==
- Winfield, Rif; Tredrea, John M.; García-Torralba Pérez, Enrique & Blasco Felip, Manuel (2023). Spanish Warships in the Age of Sail 1700—1860: Design, Construction, Careers and Fates. Seaforth Publishing. ISBN 978-1-5267-9078-1.
