= Zaykov =

Zaikov/Zaykov, feminine:Zaikova/Zaykova is a Russian surname. Notable people with the surname include:

- Lev Zaykov (1923–2002), Russian politician
- Potap Kuzmich Zaikov (died 1791), Russian navigator
- Tatyana Polnova née Zaykova (born 1979), Russian pole vaulter
- Sergey Zaikov (born 1987), Kazakhstani sprinter
