= Nootka Crisis =

1789 naval incident near Vancouver Island

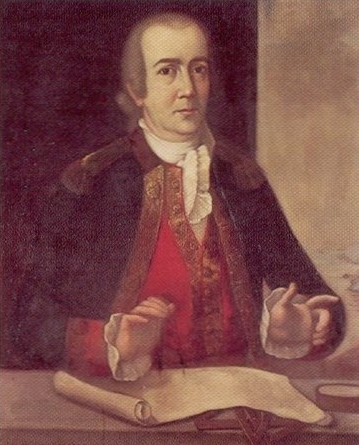
c. 1785 portrait of Martínez

The Nootka Crisis, also known as the Spanish Armament, was an international incident and political dispute between Spain and Great Britain triggered by a series of events revolving around sovereignty claims and rights of navigation and trade. It took place during the summer of 1789 at the Spanish outpost of Santa Cruz de Nuca on Vancouver Island. The commander of the outpost, Esteban José Martínez Fernández y Martínez de la Sierra, seized several British merchantmen intending on engaging in the maritime fur trade and building a permanent outpost at Nootka Sound.

A public outcry in Britain led to the mobilization of the Royal Navy, and the possibility of war. Both sides called upon allies. The Dutch joined the side of the British; the Spanish Navy was mobilized in response along with the navy of Spain's ally France, though the French soon announced they would not go to war. Without French help, Spain had little hope against the British and Dutch, resulting in the Spanish seeking a diplomatic solution and making concessions.

The crisis was thus resolved peacefully but with difficulty through a set of three agreements, known collectively as the Nootka Convention. British and Spanish subjects were allowed to trade up to ten leagues (30 miles; 48 km) from parts of the coast already occupied by Spain in northwestern North America by April 1789 and could form trade-related settlements in unoccupied areas. Spain renounced many of its exclusive trade rights and territorial claims in the area, ending a 200-year monopoly on Asian-Pacific trade. The immediate outcome was a success for British mercantile interests.

== Background ==
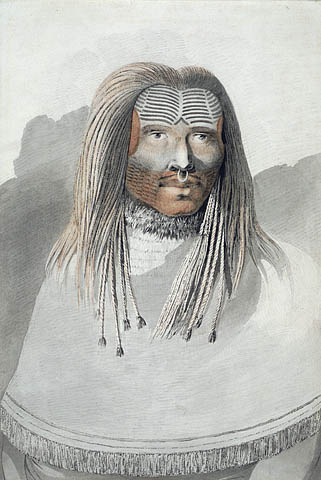
A Nuu-chah-nulth man drawn by John Webber, Captain Cook's official artist, c. 1778.

Northwestern North America (the Pacific Northwest) was little-explored by European ships before the mid-18th century. But by the end of the century, several nations were vying for control of the region, namely Britain, Spain, Russia, and the United States.

For centuries Spain had claimed the entire Pacific coast of North and South America. This claim was based on a number of events. In 1493 Pope Alexander VI had issued the Inter caetera papal bull, dividing the western hemisphere into Spanish and Portuguese zones, based on the discovery of the Americas in 1492, in theory granting nearly the entire New World to Spain. This was further defined in the 1494 Treaty of Tordesillas. More importantly, in 1513 Spanish explorer Balboa crossed the Isthmus of Panama and became the first European to sight the Pacific Ocean from the Americas, formally laying claim to all the shores washed by the Pacific Ocean. As the years went by new criteria for determining sovereignty evolved in European international law, including "prior discovery" and "effective occupation". Spain made claims of prior discovery for the northwest coast of North America through voyages of Cabrillo in 1542, Ferrer in 1543, and Vizcaino in 1602–03. Before the early 17th century, these voyages had not reached north of the 44th parallel, and Spain had no "effective settlement" north of Mexico. Thus when, in the mid-18th century, the Russians began to explore Alaska and establish fur trading posts, Spain responded by building a new naval base at San Blas, Mexico, and using it for sending a series of exploration and reconnaissance voyages to the far northwest. These voyages, intended to ascertain the Russian threat and to establish "prior discovery" claims, were supplemented by the "effective settlement" of Alta California. Starting in 1774, Spanish expeditions were sent to northern Canada and Alaska to reassert Spain's claims and navigation rights in the area. By 1775 Spanish exploration had reached Bucareli Bay including the mouth of the Columbia River between present-day Oregon and Washington, and Sitka Sound.

James Cook of Britain's Royal Navy explored the Pacific Northwest coast, including Nootka Sound, in 1778. His journals were published in 1784 and aroused great interest in the fur trading potential of the region. Even before 1784 unauthorized accounts had already familiarized British merchants with the possible profits to be made. The first British trader to arrive on the northwest coast after Cook was James Hanna, in 1785. News of the large profit Hanna made selling northwest furs in China inspired many other British ventures.

Cook's visit to Nootka Sound, a network of inlets on the west coast of Vancouver Island, would later be used by the British in their claim to the region, even though Cook made no effort to formally claim possession. Spain countered by citing Juan Pérez, who anchored in Nootka Sound in 1774.

By the late 1780s Nootka Sound was the most important anchorage on the northwestern coast. Russia, Britain, and Spain all made moves to occupy it for good.

John Meares was one of the movers behind the early British fur trading effort in the Pacific Northwest. After an ill-fated voyage to Alaska in 1786–87, Meares returned to the region in 1788. He arrived at Nootka Sound in command of the Felice Adventurero, along with the Iphigenia Nubiana under William Douglas. The ships were registered in Macau, a Portuguese colony in China, and used Portuguese flags in order to evade the British East India Company monopoly on trading in the Pacific. Non-British ships were not required to have licences from the East India Company.

Meares later reported that Maquinna, a chief of the Nuu-chah-nulth (Nootka) people, sold him some land on the shore of Friendly Cove in Nootka Sound, in exchange for some pistols and trade goods, and that on this land some kind of building was erected. These claims would become a key point in Britain's position during the Nootka Crisis. Spain strongly disputed both claims, and the facts of the matter have never been fully established. The land and building aside, there is no doubt that Meares's men, and a group of Chinese workers they brought, built the sloop North West America. It was launched in September 1788, the first non-indigenous vessel built in the Pacific Northwest. The North West America would also play a role in the Nootka Crisis, being one of the vessels seized by Spain.

At the end of the summer Meares and the three ships left.

During the winter of 1788–89 Meares was in Guangzhou (Canton), China, where he and others including John Henry Cox and Daniel Beale formed a partnership called the Associated Merchants Trading to the Northwest Coast of America. Plans were made for more ships to sail to the Pacific Northwest in 1789, including Princess Royal, under Thomas Hudson, and Argonaut under James Colnett. The consolidation of the fur trading companies of Meares and the Etches (King George's Sound Company) resulted in James Colnett being given the overall command. Colnett's orders in 1789 were to establish a permanent fur trading post at Nootka Sound based on the foothold accomplished by Meares.

While the British fur traders were getting organized, the Spanish were continuing their effort to secure the Pacific Northwest. At first the Spanish were responding mainly to Russian activity in Alaska. On a 1788 voyage to Alaska, Esteban José Martínez had learned that the Russians were intending to establish a fortified outpost at Nootka Sound. This, in addition to the increasing use of Nootka Sound by British fur traders, resulted in the Spanish decision to assert sovereignty on the northwest coast once and for all. Plans were laid for Nootka Sound to be colonized. Spain hoped to establish and maintain sovereignty on the entire coast as far north as the Russian posts in Prince William Sound.

The Viceroy of New Spain, Manuel Antonio Flórez, instructed Martínez to occupy Nootka Sound, build a settlement and fort, and to make it clear that Spain was setting up a formal establishment.

In early 1789 the Spanish expedition under Martínez arrived at Nootka Sound. The force consisted of the warship La Princesa, commanded by Martínez, and the supply ship San Carlos, under Gonzalo López de Haro. The expedition built British Columbia's first European settlement Santa Cruz de Nuca on Nootka Sound, including houses, a hospital, and Fort San Miguel.

== Crisis ==
=== Nootka Incident ===
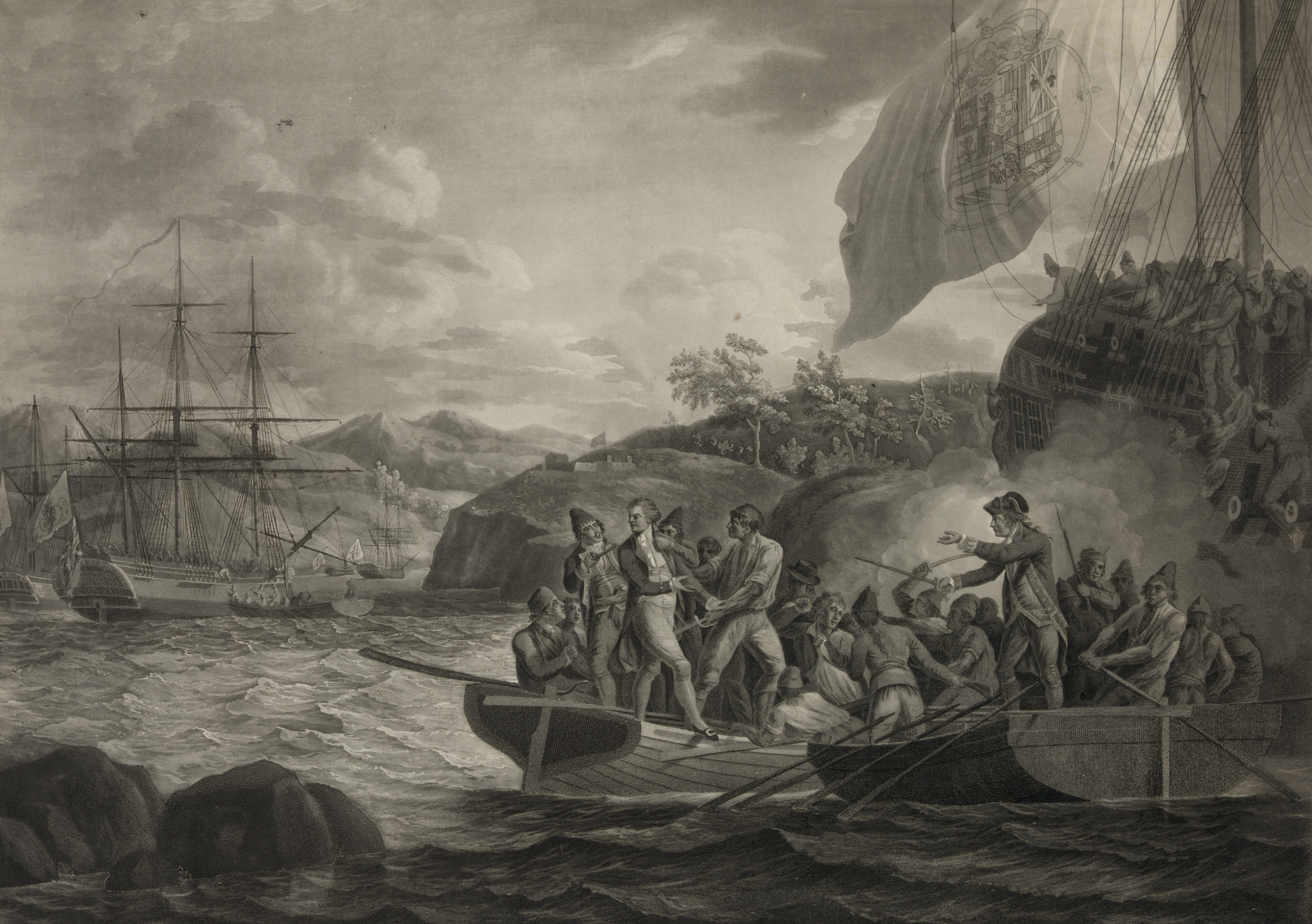
Seizure of Colnett

Martínez arrived at Nootka Sound on May 5, 1789. He found three ships already there. Two were American, Columbia Rediviva and Lady Washington, under John Kendrick and Robert Gray, which had wintered at Nootka Sound. The British ship was Iphigenia. It was seized and its captain, William Douglas, was arrested. After a few days Martínez released Douglas and his ship and ordered him to leave and not return. Douglas heeded the warning.

On June 8, the North West America, under Robert Funter, arrived at Nootka Sound and was seized by Martínez. The sloop was renamed Santa Gertrudis la Magna and used for exploring the region. José María Narváez was given command and sailed far into the Strait of Juan de Fuca. Martínez later claimed that Funter had abandoned the vessel. Martínez had given supplies to Iphigenia and claimed his seizure of the North West America was for the purpose of holding the vessel as a security for the money owed by Meares's company for the supplies.

On June 24, in front of the British and Americans present at Nootka Sound, Martínez performed a formal act of sovereignty, taking possession of the entire northwest coast for Spain.

On July 2, the British ships Princess Royal and Argonaut arrived. The Princess Royal was first, and Martínez ordered its captain, Thomas Hudson to abandon the area and return to China, based on Spain's territorial and navigation rights. Later in the day the Argonaut arrived and Martínez seized the ship and arrested Colnett, his crew, and the Chinese workers Colnett had brought. In addition to the Chinese workers, the Argonaut carried a considerable amount of equipment. Colnett said that he was intending to build a settlement at Nootka Sound, which was considered a violation of Spanish sovereignty. After a hot-tempered argument Martínez arrested Colnett.

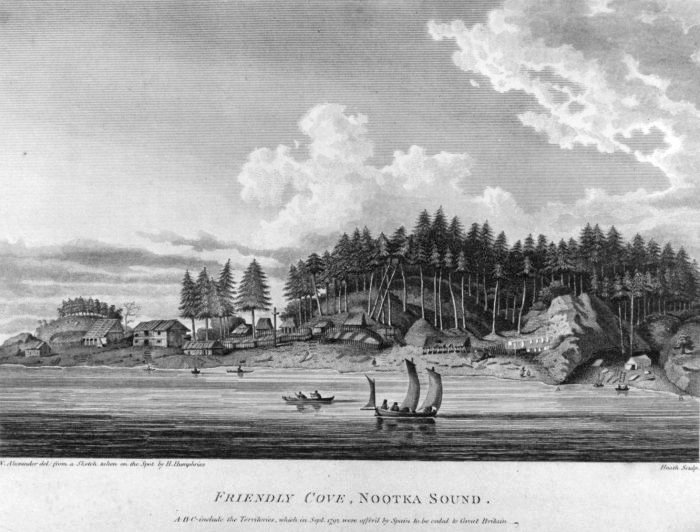
Friendly Cove (Yuquot)

Later, Martínez used the Chinese workforce to build Fort San Miguel and otherwise improve the Spanish post. The Argonaut also carried materials for the construction of a new ship. After Narváez returned in the Santa Gertrudis la Magna (the seized and renamed North West America), the materials from the Argonaut were used to improve the vessel. By the end of 1789 the Santa Gertrudis la Magna was in San Blas, where it was dismantled. The pieces were taken back to Nootka Sound in 1790 by Francisco de Eliza and used to build a schooner, christened Santa Saturnina. This vessel, the third incarnation of the North West America, was used by Narváez during his 1791 exploration of the Strait of Georgia.

On July 12, Hudson returned to Nootka Sound with the Princess Royal. He did not intend to enter, but was becalmed. This was seen as a provocation and he was seized by the Spanish.

The Nuu-chah-nulth tribes of the region spoke as many as thirteen distinct dialects. On July 13, one of the Nuu-chah-nulth leaders, Callicum, the brother of Maquinna, went to meet with Martínez, who was on board the newly captured Princess Royal. Callicum's attitude and angry calls alarmed the Spanish and somehow Callicum ended up shot dead. Sources differ over exactly how this happened. Some say that Martínez fired a warning shot and a nearby Spanish sailor, thinking Martínez meant to kill and missed, fired as well and killed Callicum. Another source says that Martínez aimed to hit Callicum but his musket misfired and another sailor fired his musket and killed Callicum. Sources also differ over what Callicum was angry about, whether it was the seizing of ships, or something else. In any case the event caused a rift between the Spanish and the Nuu-chah-nulth. Maquinna, in fear of his life, fled to Clayoquot Sound and moved with his people from Yuquot to Aoxsha.

On July 14 the Argonaut set sail for San Blas, with a Spanish crew and Colnett and his crew as prisoners. Two weeks later the Princess Royal followed, with the San Carlos as an escort.

The American ships Columbia Rediviva and Lady Washington, also fur trading, were in the area all summer, sometimes anchored in Friendly Cove (Yuquot). Martínez left them alone even though his instructions were to prevent ships of any nation from trading at Nootka Sound. The captured crew of the North West America was sent to the Columbia before the Americans set sail for China.

Despite the ongoing conflict and the warnings, two other American ships arrived at Nootka Sound late in the season. As a result, the first of these ships, the Fair American, under Thomas Humphrey Metcalfe, was captured by the forces of Martínez upon arrival. Its sister ship, the Eleanora, under Humphrey's father, Simon Metcalfe, was nearly captured but escaped.

On July 29, 1789 the Spanish supply ship Aranzazu arrived from San Blas with orders from Viceroy Flores to evacuate Nootka Sound by the end of the year. By the end of October the Spanish had completely abandoned Nootka Sound. They returned to San Blas with the Princess Royal and the Argonaut, with their captains and crews as prisoners, as well as the Fair American. The captured North West America, renamed Santa Gertrudis la Magna, returned to San Blas separately. The Fair American was released in early 1790 without much notice.

By late 1789 Viceroy Flores had already been replaced with a new viceroy, Juan Vicente de Güemes Padilla Horcasitas y Aguayo, 2nd Count of Revillagigedo, who was determined to continue defending the Spanish rights to the area, including settling Nootka Sound and the Pacific Northwest coast in general. Martínez, who had enjoyed the favor of Flores, became a scapegoat under the new regime. The senior commander of the Spanish naval base at San Blas, Juan Francisco de la Bodega y Quadra, replaced Martínez as the primary Spaniard in charge of Nootka Sound and the northwest coast. A new expedition was organized and in early 1790 Nootka Sound was reoccupied by the Spanish, under the command of Francisco de Eliza. The fleet sent to Nootka Sound in 1790 was the largest Spanish force yet sent to the northwest.

=== Diplomatic responses ===
News about the events at Nootka Sound reached London in January 1790. The main statesmen involved in the impending crisis were William Pitt the Younger, the British Prime Minister, and José Moñino y Redondo, conde de Floridablanca, the chief minister of Spain.

Pitt made the claim that the British had the right to trade in any Spanish territory desired, despite Spanish laws to the contrary. He knew this claim was indefensible and would likely lead to war, but felt driven to make it by "the public outcry" in Britain.

Despite previous hostilities, the governments of Britain and France met in private to discuss terms of an alliance against Spain in the event of war over the Nootka Sound territorial claims. Correspondence of these events has been lost or may have been purposefully destroyed. It is likely that this correspondence between Pitt, William Augustus Miles, and Hugh Elliot were commissioned and ordered to be destroyed by the British Cabinet in order to discuss such an alliance.

In April 1790 John Meares arrived in England, confirmed various rumors, claimed to have bought land and built a settlement at Nootka before Martínez, and generally fanned the flames of anti-Spanish feelings. In May the issue was taken up in the House of Commons as the Royal Navy began to make preparations for hostilities. An ultimatum was delivered to Spain. In May, the British Parliament passed an act authorising the establishment of a penal colony at Nootka Sound.

The crisis as a territorial dispute was the first international crisis for the United States of America under its first president George Washington, which had existed under 20 years before the onset of the crisis in 1790. Notable thinkers of the new country including Thomas Paine concluded that the crisis represented a dangerous entanglement of United States alliances, threatening to drag the nation into a decidedly European war. The Nootka Incident, however, did not spark a crisis in the relationship of the United States and Spain.

Meares published an account of his Voyages in 1790, which gained widespread attention, especially in light of the developing Nootka Crisis. Meares not only described his voyages to the northwest coast, but put forward a grand vision of a new economic network based in the Pacific, joining in trade widely separated regions such as the Pacific Northwest, China, Japan, Hawaii, and England. This idea tried to imitate Spain's centuries-old Pacific and Atlantic trade networks of the Manila Galleons and Atlantic treasure fleets which linked Asia and the Philippines with North America and Spain since the 16th century. Meares' vision required a loosening of the monopolistic power of the East India Company and the South Sea Company, which between them controlled all British trade in the Pacific. Meares argued strongly for loosening their power. His vision eventually came to pass, in its general form, but not before the long struggle of the Napoleonic Wars was over.

Both Britain and Spain sent powerful fleets of warships towards each other in a show of force. There was a chance of open warfare had the fleets encountered one another, but they did not.

In the meantime the Dutch Republic provided naval support to the British, a result of a shift of an alliance from France to Britain. This was the first test of the Triple Alliance of Britain, Prussia, and the Dutch Republic.

The role of France in the conflict was key. France and Spain were allies under the Family Compact between the ruling Bourbon houses. The combined French and Spanish fleets would be a serious threat to the Royal Navy. The French Revolution had broken out in July 1789 but had not reached truly serious levels by the summer of 1790. Louis XVI was still the monarch and the French military was relatively intact. In response to the Nootka Crisis France mobilized its navy, but by the end of August the French government had decided it could not become involved. The National Assembly, growing in power, declared that France would not go to war. Spain's position was threatened and negotiations to avoid war began.

=== Nootka Conventions ===
The first Nootka Convention, called the Nootka Sound Convention, resolved the crisis in general and it was signed on 28 October 1790. The convention held that the northwest coast would be open to traders of both Britain and Spain, that the captured British ships would be returned and an indemnity paid. It also held that the land owned by the British at Nootka Sound would be restored, which proved difficult to carry out. The Spanish claimed that the only such land was the small parcel where Meares had built the North West America. The British held that Meares had in fact purchased the whole of Nootka Sound from Maquinna, as well as some land to the south. Until the details were worked out, which took several years, Spain retained control of Nootka Sound and continued to garrison the fort at Friendly Cove. Complicating the issue was the changing role of the Nuu-chah-nulth in relation to Britain and Spain. The Nuu-chah-nulth had become highly suspicious and hostile toward Spain following the 1789 killing of Callicum. But the Spanish worked hard to improve the relationship, and by the time of Nootka Conventions were to be carried out the Nuu-chah-nulth were essentially allied with the Spanish. This development came about in a large degree due to the efforts by Alessandro Malaspina and his officers during his month-long stay at Nootka Sound in 1791. Malaspina was able to regain the trust of Maquinna and the promise that the Spanish had the rightful title of land ownership at Nootka Sound. Previous to this dispute, the Spanish had enjoyed exclusive access to the area and enjoyed positive, prosperous relations with the Nuu-chah-nulth peoples based on their sovereign claims to the entirety of the Northwest Coast, as ordained by papal order (Inter caetera) dating back to 1493.

Negotiations between Britain and Spain over the details of the Nootka Convention were to take place at Nootka Sound in the summer of 1792, for which purpose Juan Francisco de la Bodega y Quadra came. The British negotiator was George Vancouver, who arrived from Falmouth on August 28, 1792. Vancouver understood from the discussions he had had with ministers and officials in London before his departure that his task was to receive back from the Spanish commander at Nootka Sound land and property that had been confiscated from the English fur traders in July 1789 and of establishing a formal British presence there to support and promote the fur trade. Proposals to establish a British colony on the North West Coast had been discussed in commercial and official circles in the 1780s, encouraged by the success of the project to colonize Botany Bay and Norfolk Island. One of the ships to be used for the transport of convicts and marines to the penal colony established by the Parliament was to have been the Discovery, which Vancouver afterwards commanded during his expedition. He believed that once he had accepted restitution of Nootka Sound its and associated territory he was to make preparations for founding a British colony there under the name of New Georgia, that, at least initially, would have had a close connection with the New South Wales colony. He was also instructed to undertake a hydrographic survey of the region to be colonized and attempt to find a seaway leading from it to the North Atlantic: the long-sought North West Passage. A change to a more conciliatory British policy toward Spain after he left England in April 1791, a result of challenges arising from the French Revolution, which was not communicated to him, left him in an embarrassing situation in his negotiations with the Spanish commander at Nootka. Although Vancouver and Bodega y Quadra were friendly with one another, their negotiations did not go smoothly. Spain desired to set the Spanish-British boundary at the Strait of Juan de Fuca, but Vancouver insisted on British rights to the Columbia River. Vancouver also objected to the new Spanish post at Neah Bay. Bodega y Quadra insisted on Spain retaining Nootka Sound, which Vancouver could not accept. In the end the two agreed to refer the matter to their respective governments.

By 1793 Britain and Spain had become allies in the war against France. The issues of the Nootka Crisis had become less important, so the new British foreign minister Grenville dropped any territorial claim in order to avoid raising "useless jealousy" on the part of Spain. The Third Nootka Convention was signed on January 11, 1794, in Madrid, under which both nations agreed to abandon Nootka Sound, with a ceremonial transfer of the post at Friendly Cove to the British. The quiet abandonment of Britain's plans for colonization, owing to the emerging crisis in Europe after the French Revolution, and Vancouver's embarrassment at Nootka subsequently led to some misinterpretation of his achievement and of British imperial thinking at the time.

The terms of the last convention were fulfilled on March 28, 1795. José Manuel de Álava representing Spain and Lieutenant Thomas Pearce Britain. reached Nootka Sound on board of a Spanish ship. The British flag was ceremoniously raised and lowered on the small beach that Meares had bought from Maquinna. Afterwards, Pearce presented the flag to Maquinna and asked him to raise it whenever a ship appeared.

Under the Nootka Conventions, Britain and Spain agreed not to establish any permanent base at Nootka Sound, but ships from either nation could visit. The two nations also agreed to prevent any other nation from establishing sovereignty.

The Nootka Conventions are sometimes described as a commitment by Spain to withdraw from the northwest coast, but there was no such requirement.

== Aftermath ==
The Nootka Conventions undermined the notion that a country could claim exclusive sovereignty without establishing settlements. It was not enough to claim territory by a grant of the Pope, or by "right of first discovery". Claims had to be backed up with some kind of actual occupation. This departure from symbolic acts of sovereignty towards physical acts of occupation spelled the end of the era of territorial claims without actual control, meaning that nations had to be physically present in order to claim a territory.

For the British, the outcome was viewed as a success, because it was interpreted that Spain had no rights of occupation north of San Francisco, Britain felt it had gained some sort of revenge on Spain for its involvement in the American War of Independence, and the perceived victory also increased the prestige and popularity of Pitt. In addition the successful mobilisation by the Royal Navy showed a measure of recovery from the American war.

The British, however, did not meet the main goals they originally had sought. The Northwest Passage had proved to be impractical and the French Revolutionary Wars delayed any attempt to establish a substantial colony on the northwestern coast of the Pacific, as Vancouver had initially envisaged. British merchants were still restricted from trading directly with Spanish America, and the final version of the agreement did not establish any boundaries. Nevertheless, the region was opened up to British trade, and in the aftermath of the crisis she became the dominant power in the Pacific. British fur trade in the Pacific, specifically with the North West Company (NWC) increased to China and by the 1820s would become a qualified success. From 1797, the NWC had launched expeditions overland into the wilderness territories of the Rocky Mountains and Interior Plateau pushing through to the Strait of Georgia on the Pacific Coast expanding British North America Westward. In 1821, the North West Company was forced to merge into the Hudson's Bay Company, and it was through them that a settlement was established on Vancouver island in 1843, which would become a Crown Colony six years later.

For Spain the resolution of the crisis was a political humiliation and a severe blow to their government and empire. They felt they had been betrayed by France and were compelled to look for support elsewhere in Europe. The incident also signified a larger humiliation for France just as it had done two decades before in the Falklands Crisis of 1770. Once more Spain had looked upon their Bourbon ally in the face of British naval and commercial expansionism and once again France had failed to assert themselves. In addition this was the first incident to raise the question of whether the initiative in French foreign policy lay with the King or with the Constituent Assembly.

Spanish rights in the Pacific Northwest were later acquired by the United States via the Adams–Onís Treaty, signed in 1819. The United States argued that it acquired exclusive sovereignty from Spain, which became a key part of the American position during the Oregon boundary dispute. In countering the US claim of exclusive sovereignty the British cited the Nootka Conventions. This dispute was not resolved until the signing of the Oregon Treaty in 1846, dividing the disputed territory, and establishing what later became the current international boundary between Canada and the United States.

The only Spanish official expedition to Nootka Sound after the Third Convention and before the Mexican Independence took place in 1796, when the schooner Sutil from San Blas made a stopover at the inlet. There they found and rescued Scottish activist Thomas Muir, then an escapee from Botany Bay prison, and carried him to Monterey.

=== Legacy ===
In 1957, the Spanish government presented stained glass windows commemorating the conventions to the church of Friendly Cove as a gift to the Nuu-chah-nulth people.

== See also ==
- History of the west coast of North America
- HMS Discovery (1789)
- History of British Columbia
- Vancouver Expedition
- Pere d'Alberní i Teixidor
- Free Company of Volunteers of Catalonia
- Fort San Miguel
- Maritime Fur Trade
