= El Desembarcadero =

Historical Landmark in San Diego, California, United States

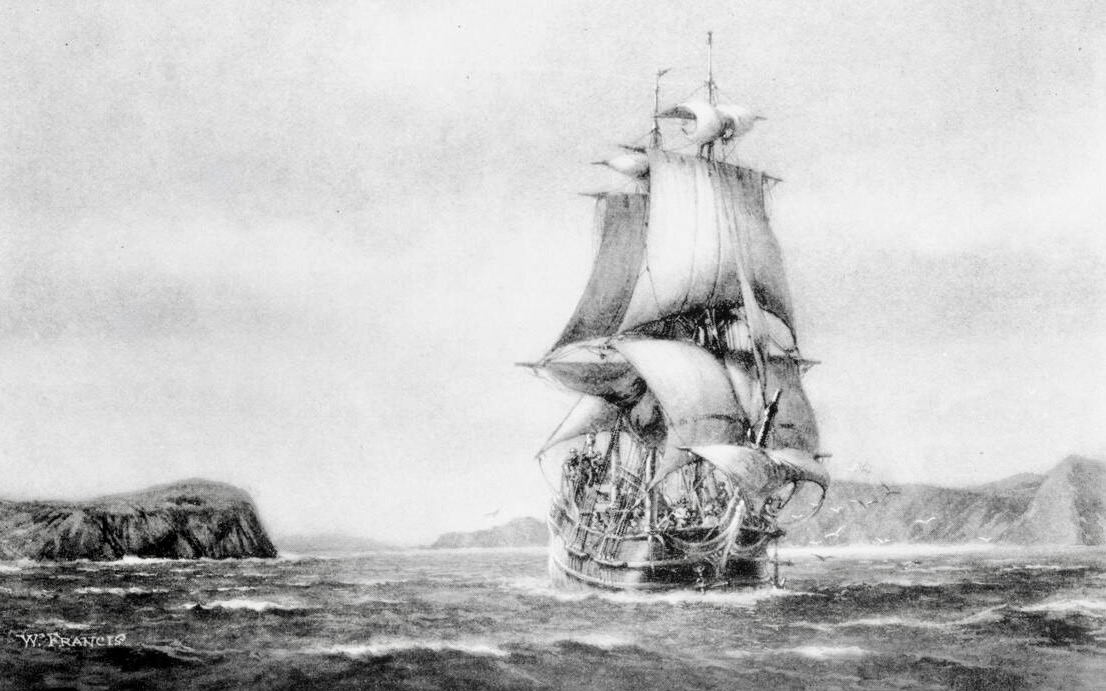
- Ship San Carlos landed (desembarcadero) in San Diego in April 29, 1769

- Location within California Location within the United States
- 32.7342°N 117.2199°W
- Location: Farragut Road,, San Diego, California

California Historical Landmark
- Designated: December 6, 1932
- Reference no.: 64

El Desembarcadero, or The Landing, is a historical site in San Diego, California, in San Diego Bay. The El Desembarcadero site is a California Historical Landmark No. 64 listed on December 6, 1932. It is the site of the landing by Spaniards coming to New Spain, Pueblo de San Diego, now Old Town, San Diego. Small ship's boats brought cargo and passengers to the San Diego Mission, Presidio of San Diego, and Pueblo San Diego. It is most likely that ships San Antonio and San Carlos landed at the site in 1769, looking fresh water on the San Diego River, on their San Diego expedition. San Antonio arrived in San Diego Bay on April 11, 1769, and the San Carlos on April 29. They landed on May 1, 1769, Some of the ship's crew died in San Diego, and Father Serra and Father Vila, remain in San Diego. T

The site is noted for the departing point of Josepha Carrillo and Henry Delano Fitch when they eloped and departed for Chile from the landing site on April 16, 1829. During World War II the old landing site was buried under dirt to build the San Diego Naval Training Station. Thus the landing site, El Desembarcadero, is about a half mile from the bay. A historical marker was placed on Farragut Road, between Rosecrans and Truxtun, at Point Loma in San Diego. The marker was placed there in 1996 by State Department of Parks and Recreation working with the United States Navy and Squibob Chapter, E Clampus Vitus.

== See also ==
- California Historical Landmarks in San Diego County
- Adobe Chapel of The Immaculate Conception
- Casa de Carrillo House
- Casa de Estudillo
- Casa de Cota
- Mission San Diego de Alcalá
- Presidio of San Diego
