= USS Bucareli Bay =

Two ships of the United States Navy have been named Bucareli Bay for the bay off the western coast of Prince of Wales Island in Alaska.

- USS Bucareli Bay (ACV-61) was a Casablanca-class escort carrier, renamed USS Manila Bay in April 1943.
- USS Bucareli Bay (CVE-98) was also a Casablanca-class escort carrier, renamed USS Kwajalein.
