= Ignacio de Arteaga y Bazán =

Spanish explorer

Ignacio de Arteaga y Bazán (17 February 1731 – 1783) was an officer of the Spanish Navy.

== Biography ==
He was born in Aracena, Andalusia. His paternal Basque family 'Arteaga' made it possible for Arteaga to join the naval academy at Cádiz. He was accepted as a guardiamarina (midshipman) in 1747 and upon graduation in 1754 was given the rank of alférez de fragata (ensign). After serving on various ships and in various places he was transferred to Havana in 1766 and given his first command, the sloop Vibora. In 1767 he was promoted to teniente de navío (lieutenant).

In 1771 Arteaga returned to Spain and tried to marry without certain required royal and ecclesiastical permissions. The priest who was to perform the marriage ceremony refused and Arteaga made an appeal to the ecclesiastical tribunal. During the proceedings grew abusive and insulting. As a consequence he was imprisoned for three years in the jail of the naval arsenal at La Carraca, Cádiz.

In 1774 he was released. Although allowed to continue his career in the navy he was exiled to the remote naval station at San Blas, on the west coast of New Spain. He arrived in San Blas in 1775. He was given command of an expedition to Alaska in 1779. Two frigates were assigned, the Favorita, commanded by Arteaga, and the Princesa, under Bodega y Quadra. With Bodega y Quadra on the Princesa was second officer Francisco Antonio Mourelle, surgeon Mariano Nunez Esquivel, pilot Jose Canizares, and second pilot Juan Bautista Aguirre. The expedition's objective was to evaluate the Russian penetration of Alaska, search for a Northwest Passage, and capture James Cook if they found him in Spanish waters. Arteaga and Bodega y Quadra did not find Cook, who had been killed in Hawaii in February 1779.

The two frigates sailed directly from San Blas to Bucareli Bay, Alaska. The voyage of 81 days, which was relatively fast, leaving time for further exploration. Arteaga and Bodega y Quadra carefully surveyed Bucareli Bay then headed north to present-day Port Etches on Hinchinbrook Island, near the entrance to Prince William Sound. While the ships were anchored, Arteaga took a party ashore to perform a formal possession ceremony. All the officers and chaplains went ashore in procession, raised a large cross while cannons and muskets fired salutes. The Te Deum was sung, followed by a litany and prayers. After a sermon was preached a formal deed of possession was drawn up and signed by the officers and chaplains. Arteaga named the site Puerto de Santiago, commemorating Saint James, the patron saint of Spain, whose feast day falls on July 25. The title to Puerto de Santiago was important for years afterward, as it formed the basis of Spain's claim to sovereignty in the North Pacific up to 61°17′N.

Arteaga and Bodega y Quadra also explored Cook Inlet, and the Kenai Peninsula, where a possession ceremony was performed on August 2, 1779, in what today is called Port Chatham. Due to various sicknesses among the crew Arteaga decided to return south. On September 8, the ships rejoined and began the return trip to San Blas. Although the Spanish were normally secretive about their exploring voyages and the discoveries made, the 1779 voyage of Arteaga and Bodega y Quadra became widely known. La Perouse obtained a copy of their map, which was published in 1798. Mourelle's journal was acquired and published in London in 1798 by Daines Barrington.

After returning to San Blas, Arteaga requested and received a royal pardon and reinstatement of his loss of pension. He did not go to sea again, due to "broken health". Arteaga served as commandant of the naval department of San Blas until his death in 1783. Shortly before he died he was promoted to capitán de fragata (commander)—his first promotion in 16 years.

== See also ==
- Spanish expeditions to the Pacific Northwest
