= Potap Kuzmich Zaikov =

Russian explorer (fl. 1770s–1790s)

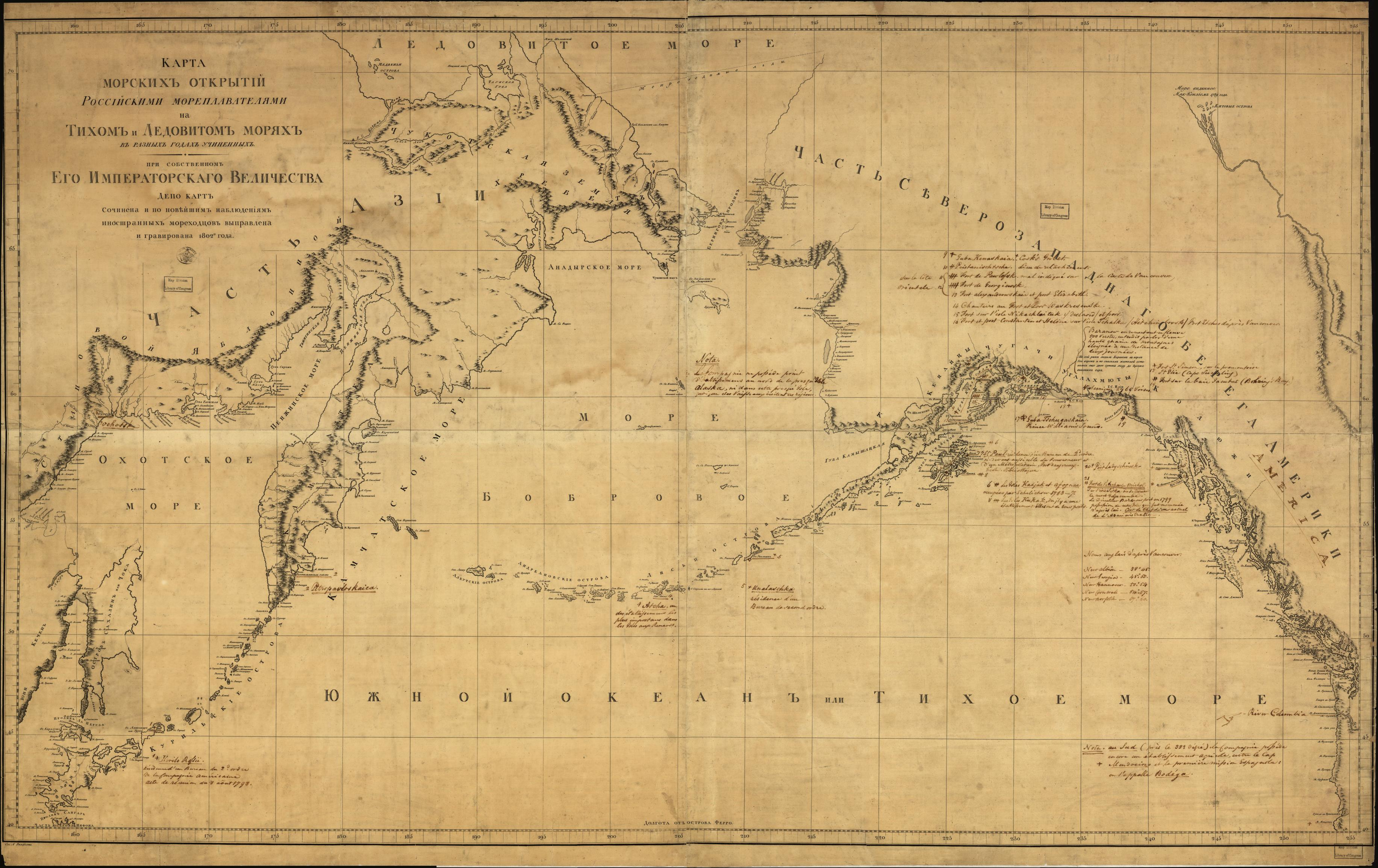
Map of maritime discoveries made by Russian navigators in the Pacific and Arctic seas over the years.

Potap Kuzmich Zaikov (17??-1791) was a Russian navigator who operated across the Bering Sea and the Gulf of Alaska during the developing Maritime Fur Trade from the 1770s to 1791. Working primarily in what became Russian America, Zaikov would over the course of his career be employed by several groups of Russian fur merchants.

== Vladimir ==
Zaikov at first worked for the Panov brothers, who also employed Evstratii Delarov. Zaikov departed from Okhotsk in 1772 aboard the Panov vessel Vladimir, staffed with 57 Russians and 10 Yakuts. The winter was spent at the mouth of the Vorovskaya river on the Kamchatka Peninsula, where Vladimir remained until July 1773. Next the vessel went to Medny Island, spending the following year collecting food for the upcoming voyage. On 30 July 1775, Vladimir anchored at Attu Island, spending the following year collecting fur pelts in addition to ferrying 10 men to Agattu Island where they formed an artel for further fur exploitation. Departing from the Near Islands in July 1776, Zaikov reached Unimak Island in August, where he formed his base of operations until May 1778. While on the island, he forced the collection of the Yasak from 89 Aleuts, being later valued at ₽10,684. On the return voyage to Siberia, Zaikov wintered at Umnak Island, and in the following year Agattu was visited to gather the artel men left there. After crossing the Bering Sea, Vladimir reached Okhotsk on 6 September 1779 with 12 men having died during the multi-year voyage. Profits amounted to ₽165,600 on the Okhotsk market, with the animal products primarily being over 3,800 Sea otter skins, almost 4,000 hides from various fox species, 1,725 Northern fur seal skins and 335 Walrus tusks..

== Later career ==
The next voyage Zaikov undertook was in the employ of a Tula businessman, commanding the Sv. Pavel with a crew of 70 Promyshlenniki. Departing Okhotsk in 1781, the crew wintered at Bering Island. The following year was spent among the Fox Islands, where active trade with the native Aleuts was commenced. In July 1783, Sv. Pavel was located in the Prince William Sound, where a skirmish arose with Chugach indigenous that left 8 of the crew dead. Throughout the remainder of the 1780s, Zaikov remained based on Unalaska Island. During his time there the Spanish Empire was actively exploring the region. He would meet several Spanish explorers in 1788, Esteban José Martínez commanding the La Princesa and Gonzalo López de Haro of the San Carlos. Zaikov died on Unalaska Island in 1791.
