= Salvador Fidalgo =

Spanish explorer

- Born: Salvador Fidalgo y Lopegarcía; August 6, 1756; La Seu d'Urgell, province of Lleida (Catalonia, Spain)
- Died: September 27, 1803 (aged 47); Tacubaya, New Spain
- Occupation: Explorer

Salvador Fidalgo y Lopegarcía (6 August 1756 – 27 September 1803) was a Spanish explorer. He commanded an exploring expedition for Spain to Alaska and the Pacific Northwest during the late 18th century.

== Early life, family and education ==
Fidalgo was born in La Seu d'Urgell in the province of Lleida, in the region of Catalonia, Spain, the heir of a noble Navarrese family. He joined the Spanish Navy as a guardiamarina (midshipman) at the Real Colegio de Guardiamarinas in Cádiz. He graduated in 1775 and was given the rank of Alférez de Fragata (Frigate Ensign).

== Career ==
He was chosen to be a member of Vicente Tofiño's team of cartographers working during the 1780s on the first atlas of Spain's ports and coastal waters. He served on various assignments in the Mediterranean and saw action against the British and Portuguese. In 1778 he was promoted to Teniente de Navío (Lieutenant) and assigned to the Spanish naval station at San Blas, Mexico.

=== Spain and the Pacific Northwest ===
The Spanish claim to Alaska and the Pacific Northwest had dated back to a 1493 papal bull (Inter caetera) and rights contained in the 1494 Treaty of Tordesillas; these two formal acts gave Spain the exclusive rights to colonize all of the Western Hemisphere (excluding Brazil), including the exclusive rights to colonize all of the west coast of North America. The first European expedition to actually reach the west coast of North America was led by the Spaniard Vasco Núñez de Balboa, which achieved the Pacific coast of Panama in 1513. Balboa claimed the Pacific Ocean for the Spanish Crown, as well as the lands touching it, including all of the west coast of North America. This action of Balboa further solidified the Spanish claim of exclusive control over the entire west coast of North America.

The claims unchallenged, the Spanish Empire did not explore or settle the northwest coast of North America in the 250 years after Balboa's claim. By the late 18th century, however, learning of Russian Empire and British arrivals along the Pacific coast, Spain finally grew sufficiently concerned about their claims to the Pacific Northwest and set out to learn the extent of the Russian and British encroachment.

=== Fidalgo expedition of 1790 ===
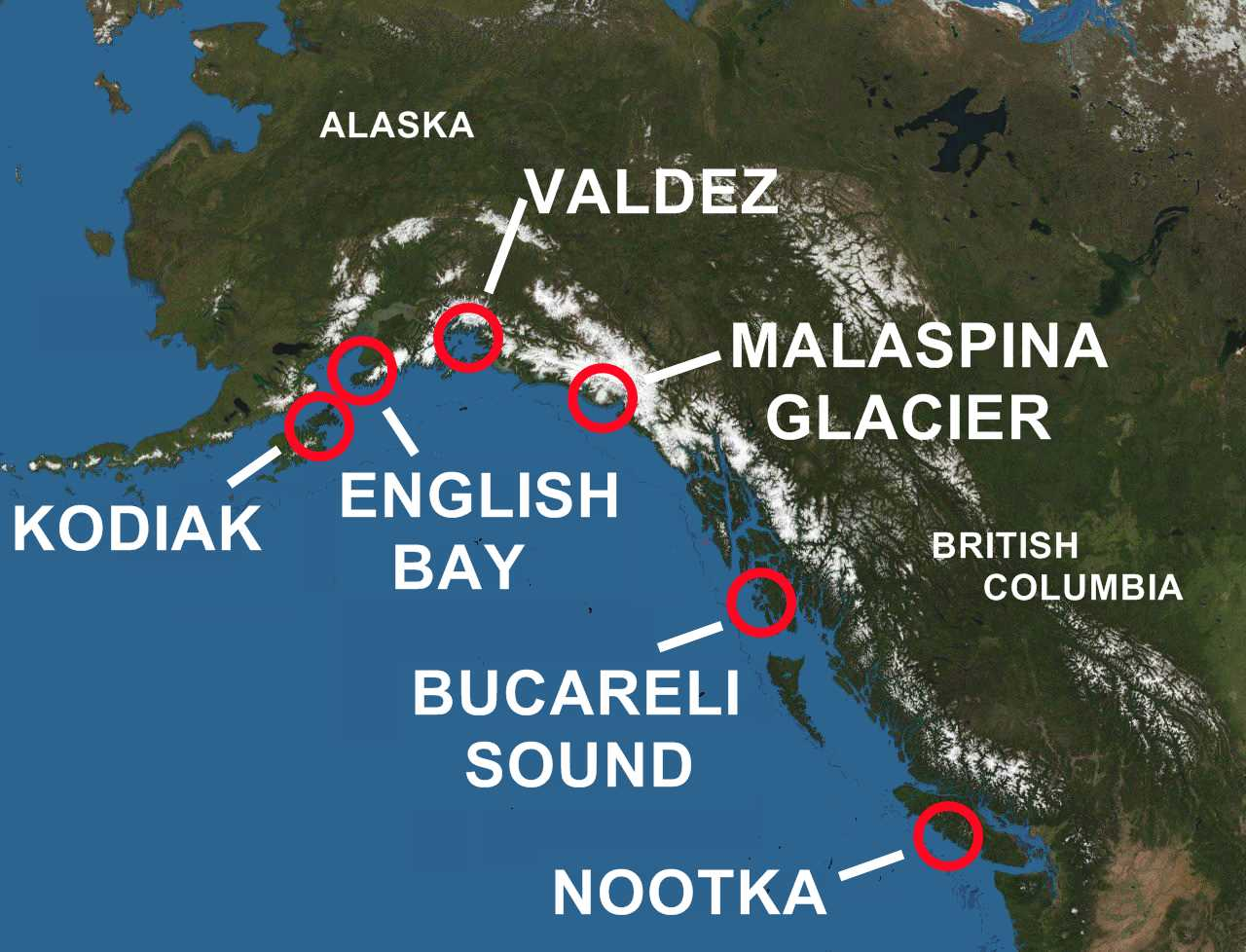
Locations of Spanish contact in Pacific Northwest

In 1790, at the direction of Juan Vicente de Güemes Padilla Horcasitas y Aguayo, 2nd Count of Revillagigedo, the Viceroy of New Spain, Fidalgo was sent to New Spain's northernmost settlement, San Lorenzo de Nootka, just off today's Vancouver Island. In May 1790, Fidalgo sailed out of Nootka and some weeks later, anchored off present-day Cordova, Alaska. The expedition found no signs of Russian presence, and traded with natives in the area. On June 3, 1790, they put ashore on today's Orca Inlet, and in a solemn ceremony, Fidalgo erected a large wooden cross, re-asserted Spanish sovereignty, and named the area Puerto Córdova. Fidalgo continued along the Alaskan coast, reaching today's Gravina Point, where the same ceremony re-asserting Spanish sovereignty was performed. On June 15, 1790, they discovered a port, which they named Puerto Valdez, after Antonio Valdés, then Minister of the Spanish Navy.

On July 4, 1790, the expedition made their first contact with the Russians, on the southwestern coast of the Kenai Peninsula, which Fidalgo named Puerto Revillagigedo. The expedition pressed on to the main Russian settlement of the time on Kodiak Island, in today's Three Saints Bay. Fidalgo entertained the Russians aboard his ship, and then on July 5, 1790, conducted another ceremony of sovereignty, near the Russian outpost of Alexandrovsk (today's English Bay or Nanwalek, Alaska), southwest of today's Anchorage on the Kenai Peninsula.

Fidalgo led the expedition back to San Blas, arriving on November 15, 1790.

=== Neah Bay ===
In 1792 Salvador Fidalgo was assigned to establish a Spanish post at Neah Bay (the Spanish name was Bahía de Núñez Gaona), on the southwestern coast of the Strait of Juan de Fuca in present-day U.S. state of Washington. He arrived from San Blas on the corvette Princesa on May 28, 1792. The post soon had cleared land for a garden, a livestock enclosure with a number of cows, sheep, hogs, and goats, and a stockade with a small garrison.

The post was established during the Nootka Convention negotiations between Spain and Britain in the wake of the Nootka Crisis. It was uncertain whether the Spanish post at Nootka Sound would be ceded to the British or not. Fidalgo's work at Neah Bay was in preparation for a possible relocation of Spain's Nootka Sound post.

Later during the autumn of 1792 a conflict occurred between the Makah, natives of Neah Bay, and the Spanish. Fidalgo's second in command, Pilot Antonio Serantes, was killed and in retaliation Fidalgo ordered an attack on the Makah, inflicting many casualties. For this action Fidalgo was later reprimanded by his superior officers. The post at Neah Bay was abandoned and Fidalgo was recalled to Nootka Sound.

=== Later career ===
In 1794, he was promoted to Capitán de Fragata (Frigate Captain or Commander). In 1795 he sailed to the Philippines to deliver diplomatic documents. In 1801 he suppressed a Native American rebellion at the Tiburón Island in the Gulf of California.

== Personal life and demise ==
He died on September 27, 1803, in Tacubaya, near Mexico City.

== Legacy ==
Fidalgo Island, near Puget Sound, was named in his honor, as is Port Fidalgo in Prince William Sound.
