= Juan de Ayala =

Spanish Navy officer

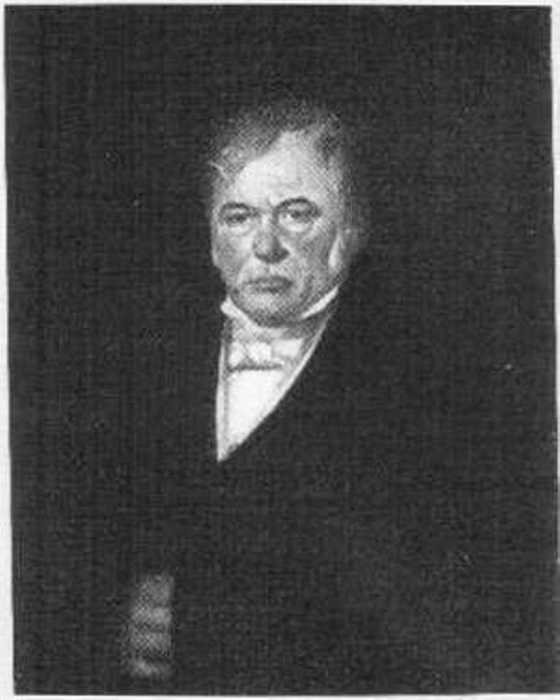
- Juan Manuel de Ayala
- Born: Juan Manuel de Ayala y Aranza; 28 December 1745; Osuna, Andalucía, Spain
- Died: 30 December 1797 (aged 52); New Spain now Mexico
- Occupation: naval officer

Juan Manuel de Ayala y Aranza (28 December 1745 – 30 December 1797) was a Spanish Navy officer who played a significant role in the European exploration of California, as he and the crew of his ship San Carlos were the first Europeans known to have entered the San Francisco Bay, having sailed there from the Port of San Blas, Nayarit, Mexico.

== Biography ==
Ayala was born in Osuna, Andalucía, Spain. He entered the Spanish navy on 19 September 1760, and rose to achieve the rank of captain by 1782. He retired (on full pay on account of his achievements in California) on March 14, 1785.

In the early 1770s, the Spanish royal authorities ordered an exploration of the north coast of California, "to Ascertain if there were any Russian Settlements on the Coast of California, and to Examine the Port of San Francisco". Don Fernando Rivera y Moncada had already marked the point for a mission in what is now San Francisco, and a land expedition to establish Spanish rule over the area, under Juan Bautista de Anza had been sent northwards. Ayala, then a Lieutenant was one of those assigned to the naval expedition. He arrived in Vera Cruz in August, 1774 and proceeded to Mexico City to receive orders from the Viceroy, Frey Don Antonio María de Bucareli y Ursua.

Bucareli sent him to San Blas where he took command of the schooner Sonora, part of a squadron under the general command of Don Bruno de Heceta, in the frigate Santiago. The squadron sailed from San Blas early in 1775. However, when they were lying outside San Blas about to set out, the commander of the packet ship San Carlos, Don Miguel Manrique, was taken ill - some sources say that he went mad. Ayala was ordered to take command of this larger vessel, sailed back to San Blas to land the unfortunate Manrique, and rejoined the squadron after a few days' sailing. Ayala was designated to pass through the strait and explore what lay within, while the Santiago and Sonora continued northwards.

The San Carlos took on supplies at Monterey, leaving there on 26 July and then proceeding northwards. Ayala passed through the Golden Gate on 5 August 1775, with some difficulty and great caution because of the tides. He tried a number of anchorages, finding that off Angel Island was most satisfactory, but failed to make contact, as he had hoped, with Anza's party. Ayala put up a wooden cross where he landed the first night. The San Carlos remained in the Bay until 18 September, returning to San Blas via Monterey. Ayala's subsequent report to the Viceroy gave a full account of the geography of the bay, and stressed its advantages as a harbour (chiefly the absence of "those troublesome fogs which we had daily in Monterey, because the fogs here hardly reach the entrance of the port, and once inside the harbor, the weather is very clear.") and the friendliness of the local Native American people.

On 12 August 1775, Ayala gave the name Isla de Alcatraces, "island of the pelicans", and what is now Yerba Buena Island, "on account of the abundance of those birds that were on it." The name was transferred in 1826 to Alcatraz Island. The word "Alcatraz" comes from Spanish, which in turn was a probably a loan word from Arabic, القطرس al-qaṭrās meaning "sea eagle." This was likely in reference to the brown pelican which has long nested on the island.
