= Evstratii Delarov =

Evstratii Ivanovich Delarov (also spelled Evstrat Delarov and Eustrate Delarof, c. 1740 – 1806, Greek: Ευστράτιος Ντελάρωφ) was a Greek mariner who served with several Russian maritime fur trade companies in Russian America. He was born in Ottoman Macedonia. He was the first documented Greek explorer and merchant to arrive in Alaska. He is considered to be the first de facto Governor of Alaska.

== Biography ==
Delarov was of Greek origin from Macedonia.

His career in Russian America dates to at least 1764, when he was in the Aleutian Islands on board the Petr i Pavel under Ivan Maksimovich Solov'ev. Delarov participated in Solov'ev's 1764 attacks on the Umnak-Unalaska Aleut alliance, which were carried out in revenge for the 1762 Fox Islands revolt—a coordinated Aleut attack on four Russian vessels and several shore parties, during which over 300 Russians were killed.

While serving Panov brothers company, Delarov used the harbor on Unga Island as a base of operations, which for many years the harbor was known as Delarov Harbor or Greko-Delarovskoe, because Delarov was Greek. In 1781-1786 Delarov and two other captains made exploratory forays from Unga Island into Prince William Sound.

Over time Delarov gained a reputation as an excellent skipper. He became part owner of various fur-trading vessels. Grigory Shelikhov met Delarov in Irkutsk and persuaded him to become the chief manager of his establishment at Three Saints Bay on Kodiak Island. Delarov sailed to Kodiak in 1787 aboard the Three Saints, commanded by Gerasim Grigor'ievich Izmailov. From 1787 to 1791 he was Alexander Baranov's predecessor as chief manager of the Shelikhov-Golikov Company. He later became a partner in the Shelikhov enterprises and a major shareholders. In 1796 he directed the company's affairs in Irkutsk.

In 1787 Delarov established an outpost at Karluk, on Kodiak Island facing the mainland across Shelikof Strait. Delarov also sent hunting parties into Resurrection Bay, where a post called Aleksandrovskaia was founded at modern-day Seldovia.

In 1788 the Spanish expedition of Gonzalo López de Haro and Esteban José Martínez sailed to Alaska to investigate Russian activity. A number of earlier Spanish voyages to Alaska had failed to find any Russians, but direct contact was made during the 1788 expedition. Haro found Shelikhov's settlement at Three Saints Bay and met with Delarov. Haro and Delarov conversed at length. Delarov informed Haro that there were seven Russian posts on the coast between Unalaska and Prince William Sound and that a Russian sloop traded south along the coast each year, as far as Nootka Sound. This latter piece of information was most likely a fabrication intended to intimidate the Spanish. That Delarov had exaggerated the strength of Russian America became clear to the Spaniards when they visited Unalaska. Delarov had told Haro that 120 Russians lived there, but the Spaniards discovered that Potap Zaikov was the only Russian there—the rest were Aleuts.

When the Russian-American Company was founded in 1799 Delarov moved to Saint Petersburg and served on the company's board of directors until his death in 1806.

== Legacy ==
A number of places are named after Delarov, including the Delarof Islands, Delarof Harbor, the U.S. Army transport ship Delarof, and the ghost town of Unga, Alaska was originally named Delarov. Evstratii is the grandfather of Pavel Viktorovich Delarov as attested in signed copy of the Historical Survey of the Formation of the Russian-American Company (1861-1863)

Government offices
Preceded by Konstantin Alekseevich Samoilov	Governor of Shelikhov-Golikov Company; 1787—1792	Succeeded by Alexander Baranov
