= Gonzalo López de Haro =

Spanish explorer (died 1823)

Gonzalo López de Haro (bef. 1788 in Puebla – 1823) was a Spanish naval officer and explorer, notable for his expeditions in the Pacific Northwest in the late 18th century.

== Background ==
In 1788 two ships were sent north to investigate Russian activity in Alaska. First Pilot Esteban José Martínez was the expedition commander and captained the sloop Princesa Real. Haro, also a pilot, was given command of the packet ship San Carlos (el Filipino). Second Pilot José María Narváez sailed with Haro. The ships arrived at Prince William Sound in May. Haro sailed San Carlos (el Filipino) west to Kodiak Island and on June 30 found the Russian post at Three Saints Bay. The Russian commander, Evstrat Delarov, provided a map of the Alaskan coast and indicated the locations of seven Russian posts containing nearly 500 men. Delarov also told Narváez that the Russians intended to occupy the port of Nootka Sound, on the west coast of Vancouver Island. Narváez returned to San Carlos (el Filipino) and Haro returned east, rejoining Martínez at Sitkinak Island. Haro and Martínez then sailed southwest to investigate Unalaska Island, where there was a large Russian post under the command of Potap Kuzmich Zaikov. Martínez arrived on July 29, Haro on August 4.

In 1790 and 1791 he was a primer piloto (first pilot) in the expedition commanded by Francisco de Eliza. Haro is reputedly the first European to discover the San Juan Islands.

In 1821, after the Mexican War of Independence, Haro was jailed in Puebla, Mexico. He died in Puebla in 1823.

Haro Strait and Lopez Island are both named after him.

== See also ==
- Juan Carrasco (explorer)
