= San Carlos (1767 ship) =

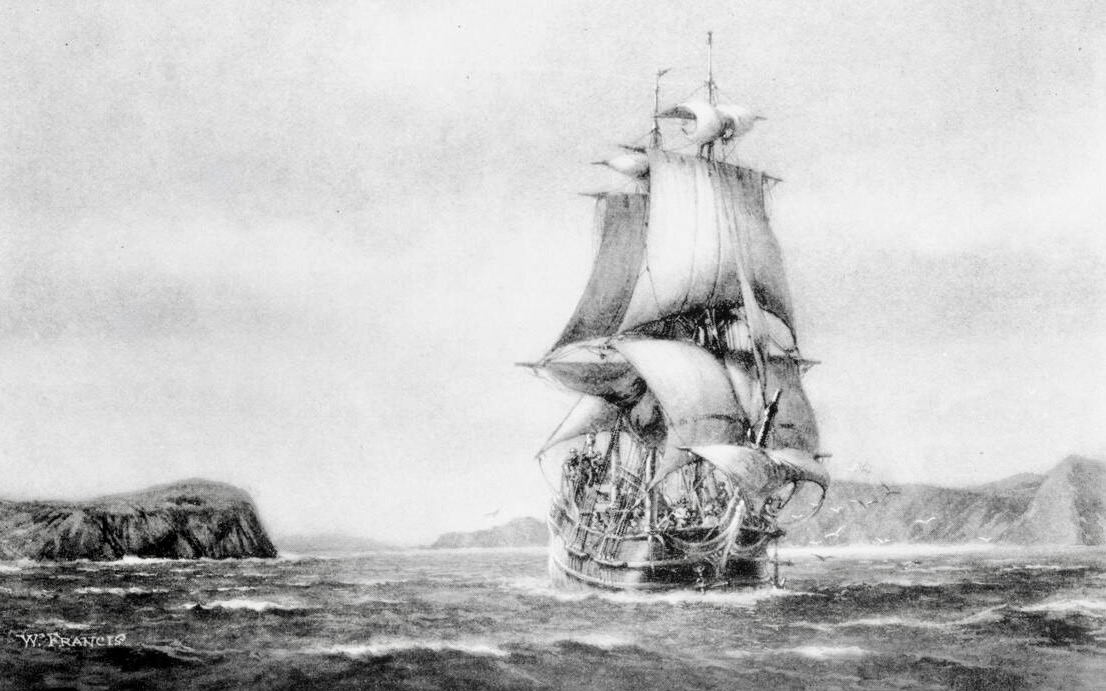
- San Carlos entering the bay of San Francisco on August 5, 1775

History

Spain
- Name: San Carlos
- Owner: Spanish Navy
- Launched: 1767
- Fate: Wrecked in the Philippines

General characteristics
- Class & type: Packet boat
- Length: 58 ft 0 in (17.68 m)
- Propulsion: Sail
- Sail plan: Brig

San Carlos was a Spanish packet boat built in 1767 at San Blas, Mexico. In 1775, under the command of Spanish naval officer and explorer Lieutenant Juan Manuel de Ayala, the San Carlos became the first ship to enter the San Francisco Bay.

== Construction and service ==
The San Carlos was built as a two-masted packet, and launched in 1767 at San Blas, Mexico.

=== San Diego expedition ===
During the Spanish rule of California, Spain's Inspector General José de Gálvez, organized the Portola Expedition for a joint land-sea journey up the Pacific coast. The expedition was led by Gaspar de Portolá, the governor of Las Californias. The first leg of the expedition consisted on five groups, all departing from Baja California and heading north to San Diego. Three groups traveled by sea, while two traveled by land in mule trains.

The three ships built in San Blas, Mexico, set sail for San Diego in early 1768. The flagship San Carlos, was captained by the lieutenant of the Spanish Navy Vicente Vila; the San Antonio, captained by Juan Pérez, a native of Palma de Majorca; and the San José. The ships crossed the Gulf of California from San Blas and reached the East Coast harbor of La Paz on the tip of Baja California in December of 1768. However, the San Carlos had to unload its cargo for repairs.

On January 9, 1769, the flagship San Carlos left the port of La Paz. Inspector General Gálvez, catholic priest Junípero Serra, and the town residents blessed and sent off the San Carlos, along with its chaplain, Franciscan friar Fernando Parrón.

Vicente Vila remained in command, followed by lieutenant Pedro Fages, who later became Lieutenant Governor of the Californias under Gaspar de Portolá. Miguel Costansó served as cartographer and engineer. Gálvez supervised the repairs and loading of the ship, which carried 25 Catalan soldiers under Fages' command. Pedro Prat, who was a member of the navy, served as crew doctor, and Hernando Patron was the ship's chaplain.

The San Antonio ship arrived in San Diego Bay landing on April 11, 1769, and the San Carlos on April 29. Many crew members on both ships were ill, mostly from scurvy. On the San Carlos most of the crew died, and only two men survived. Prat, the expedition's doctor, struggled to heal the sick men, as he too was weakened from scurvy. Friar Parrón had become weak with scurvy as well. Despite Prat's efforts, many of the sick men died in San Diego. Due to the deaths on the San Carlos, it was decided that the ship, along with Father Serra and Vila, would remain in San Diego.

=== San Francisco Bay expedition ===
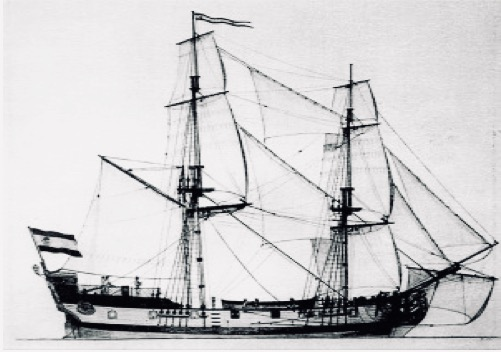
San Carlos, the first Spanish ship to enter San Francisco Bay.

Six years later, on July 26, 1775, the San Carlos took on supplies and departed Monterey, heading for San Francisco. Their mission was to locate the "Bay of San Francisco" and claim the area for Spain. The San Carlos, under the command of Spanish naval officer and explorer Lieutenant Juan Manuel de Ayala, became the first ship to enter the San Francisco Bay. It was sent by Viceroy Antonio María de Bucareli to survey the waters of the bay. On August 5, 1775, the San Carlos reached the entrance of the San Francisco Bay, known as the Golden Gate.

The ship dropped its anchor on an island that Ayala named the Isla de Los Ángeles (now known as Angel Island). The ship's pilots set out on longboats to chart the rivers of the bay. On August 12, 1775, Ayala named another island, La Isla de los Alcatraces, now called Yerba Buena Island. Before returning to San Blas, the San Carlos remained at bay until September 18, 1775. Ayala gave a detailed account of the geography of the San Francisco Bay.

The California Historical Landmark marker, No. 236, commemorates the San Carlos as the first ship to enter San Francisco Bay. The marker is located in the Aquatic Park Historic District near the corner of Beach and Larkin Streets. Below is a quote from this landmark.

First Ship Into San Francisco Bay

On August 5, 1775, the Spanish packet San Carlos, under the command of Lieutenant Juan Manuel de Ayala, became the first ship to enter San Francisco Bay. A month and a half was spent in surveying the bay from its southernmost reaches to the northern end of present-day Suisun Bay. The San Carlos departed September 18, 1775.

California Registered Historical Landmark No. 236.

Plaque placed by the State Department of Parks and Recreation in cooperation with the San Francisco Twin Bicentennial, Inc., August 5, 1975.

== Fate ==
In 1779, the San Carlos was stationed in Cavite, Philippines; being sent there, along with the San Antonio, to provide funds for defense of the Philippines during the Anglo-Spanish War. The San Carlos later wrecked in the Philippines.

== See also ==
- Spanish Navy
- California Historical Landmarks in San Francisco
- Jorge Juan y Santacilia
