= Bucareli Bay =

Bay in the Alexander Archipelago, southeastern Alaska

Coordinates: 55°22′12″N 133°24′14″W

Bucareli Bay is a bay in the Alexander Archipelago, in the southeastern part of the U.S. state of Alaska. It is located off the western coast of Prince of Wales Island, between Baker Island and Suemez Island. To the east it connects to various waterways, such as San Alberto Bay. To the west it opens directly upon the Pacific Ocean. Bucareli Bay is about 25 miles (40 km) long.

According to the United States Geological Survey, the name "Bucareli" was given in 1775 by Juan Francisco de la Bodega y Quadra, who called the bay "Puerto y Entrada de Bucareli," in honor of Antonio María de Bucareli y Ursúa, then viceroy of New Spain. In the 1790s, George Vancouver, who had access to a variety of Spanish maps, called the bay "Puerto del Baylio Bucareli." Francisco Antonio Mourelle was present with Quadra at Bucareli Bay and wrote about seeing the light of erupting volcanoes, although he was likely seeing something else, perhaps forest fires. The Spanish repeatedly visited Bucareli Bay in the late-18th century. Ignacio de Arteaga, along with Quadra and Mourelle, visited in 1779.

Two American naval ships built during World War II were each named the USS Bucareli Bay; however, they were both renamed shortly after.
