= Pedro de Alberní y Teixidor =

Spanish soldier

Pedro de Alberni

9th Governor of Alta California
- In office 1800–1800
- Preceded by: Diego de Borica
- Succeeded by: José Joaquín de Arrillaga

Personal details
- Born: January 30, 1747 Tortosa, Catalonia, Spain
- Died: March 11, 1802 (aged 55) Monterey, Las Californias, Viceroyalty of New Spain (now California, U.S.)
- Spouse: Juana Vélez
- Profession: Explorer, soldier

Pedro de Alberní y Teixidor (January 30, 1747 – March 11, 1802) was a Spanish soldier who served the Spanish Crown for almost all his life. He spent most of his military career in New Spain. He is notable for his role in the exploration of the Pacific Northwest in the 1790s, and his later term as ninth Spanish governor of Alta California in 1800.

== Biography ==
=== Early life ===
Pedro de Alberni was born on January 30, 1747, to a noble and wealthy family of Tortosa, Catalonia, Spain. His father, Jaume d'Alberní i Antolí, was notary public and Honourable Citizen of Barcelona who had married Maria Inés Teixidor on June 24, 1728. The couple had five sons and two daughters. In accordance to Catalan civil law, the oldest brother, Josep Antoni, was named heir to the Alberni estate, including the right to use the title of notary public. The remaining siblings received a small amount of money. For this reason, the rest of the brothers joined the military service. One brother, Gerònim, went to the Regiment of Córdoba; the other two, Joan Bautista and Jaume Pascual, joined the Foreign Volunteer Regiment. One of the sisters became a nun. Pedro joined Spain's Second Regiment of the Light Infantry on July 17, 1762, to fight as a cadet in the campaign of Portugal during the Seven Years' War when he was only fifteen years old. He remained with this regiment for five years, after which he joined the Free Company of Volunteers of Catalonia (Compañía Franca de Voluntarios de Cataluña), an independent military unit composed of Miquelets (Catalan irregular troops).

=== From Cádiz to New Spain ===
In 1767, the company was sent on a transatlantic journey to the colony of New Spain. The objective of the mission was to defend the Inner Northern Provinces of New Spain (Provincias Internas del Norte de Nueva España) from the natives' insurgences. These provinces ran from modern day Guanajuato to New Mexico and from Sonora to Texas.

On May 2, 1767, the Company sailed from Cádiz, Spain, to Cuba, and then to Veracruz, New Spain. Composed of 98 soldiers under the command of Captain Agustí Callis and three other officials: Pere Fages, Estevan de Vilaseca and the Alberni, they arrived at their destination on August of that same year. After Veracruz, the Company moved to Guaymas, Sonora, where they arrived in April 1768, after having crossed Mexico City, Tepic and San Blas. The trip took almost one year from Barcelona, where they had departed, to Guaymas.

=== In Sonora and California ===
Shortly after their arriving in Guaymas, the company, under the command of Colonel Domingo Elizondo were sent to fight against the rebel natives of Pima and Seri, and participate in a campaign in Cerro Prieto. After successfully finishing this campaign, Alberni and the rest of the company were sent to Mexico City and Guadalajara. After that, Alberni was commander in the province of Nayarit for seven years.

In 1772, the company was divided between the First Free Company of Volunteers of Catalonia, which remained under the command of Captain Callis, and the Second, which was under the command of Pedro Fages. Fages and a detachment of 25 traveled to Alta California in 1769 as part of the Portola expedition, under the command of Gaspar de Portola. The detachment remained in Alta California, stationed at the Presidio of Monterey, and Fages was appointed to succeed Portola as military governor in 1770. When Callis died in 1782, Alberni was named Captain of the First Company.

=== Way to the Pacific Northwest ===
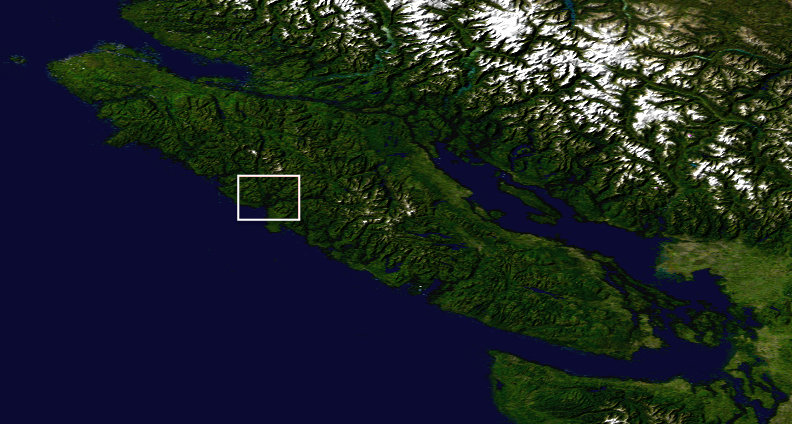
Nootka Sound marked in Vancouver Island.

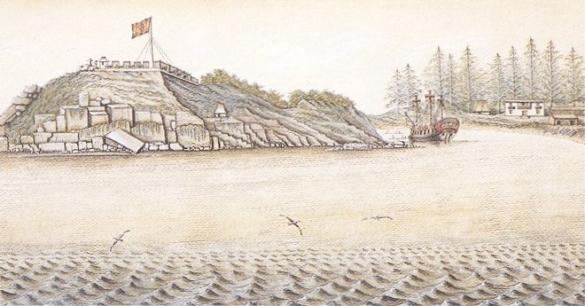
Reconstruction of Fort San Miguel.

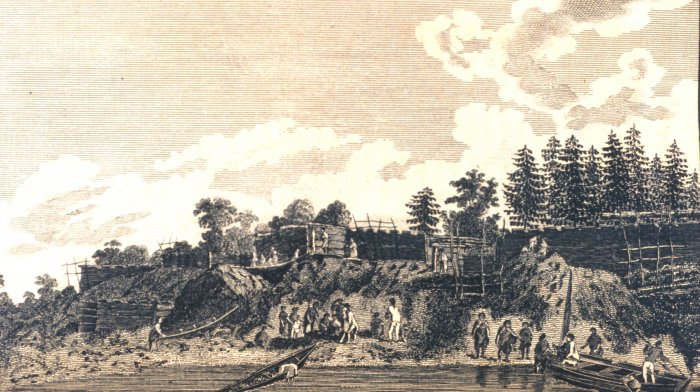
A view of the Habitations in Nootka Sound. In: "A Collection of Voyages round te World ... Captain Cook's First, Second, Third and Last Voyages ...." Volume V, London, 1790, page 1767.

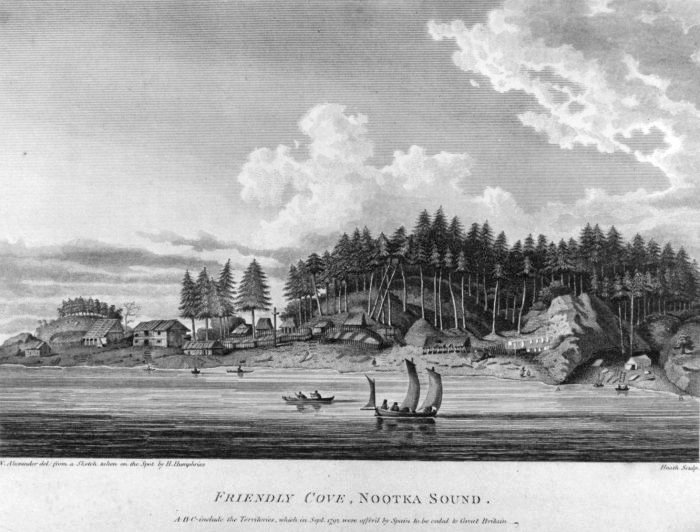
Friendly Cove, Nootka Sound. Volume I, plate VII from: "A Voyage of Discovery to the North Pacific Ocean and Round the World" by Captain George Vancouver.

In 1789, the Viceroy of New Spain Manuel Antonio Flórez, ordered the First Company of the First Free Company of Volunteers of Catalonia, under Alberni, to prepare to move to San Blas for onward transportation to Nootka Sound, on Vancouver Island, to reinforce the fortified post that had been established by Esteban José Martínez in May 1789. Martínez had sent a request for two hundred infantry, but before any reinforcements could be sent Martínez abandoned Nootka Sound, in October 1789, due to the crisis that arose after Martínez seized some British and American ships that were trading in the region and, some time later, killed Callicum, a close relative of the Nuu-chah-nulth chieftain Maquinna. Before the abandonment of Nootka was known, the King of Spain issued the Royal Order of April 14, 1789, requiring the establishment at Nootka to be maintained. In 1790, therefore, Nootka was reoccupied by an expedition under the command of Francisco de Eliza. Alberni's soldiers sailed with Eliza. At Nootka, they rebuilt and enlarged the artillery battery called Fort San Miguel.

The seizure of the English ships sparked the Nootka Controversy, which almost led to a war between Spain and England over the issue of sovereignty in the Pacific Northwest. Spain had sent a number of expeditions to the region, starting with the 1774 voyage of Juan Pérez, in order to reinforce the Spanish claim to the entire west coast of North America.

In October 1789 Juan Vicente de Güemes, 2nd Count of Revillagigedo replaced Flores as the Viceroy of New Spain and Juan Francisco de la Bodega y Quadra became commandant of the San Blas naval department, responsible for all naval operations north of Mexico. Together they organized the expedition to reoccupy Nootka Sound. On 7 December 1789 Revillagigedo ordered the First Company of the Catalan Volunteers to move to San Blas. The company consisted of about 80 soldiers when at full strength and was under the command of Captain Pedro de Alberni, who had just been appointed in Guadalajara. The soldiers began their march from Guadalajara on 1 January 1790. They sailed from San Blas with the Eliza expedition. The squadron was made up of three ships: the Concepción, under the command of Eliza, the San Carlos, under the command of Salvador Fidalgo, and Princesa Real, under the command of Manuel Quimper. They left San Blas on February 3, 1790, and arrived at Nootka Sound on April 5.

During the trip to Nootka Sound, Alberni was confined to his cabin on the Concepción for 70 days as a result of a dispute with a high ranking Spanish officer. In the course of this disagreement, he defended the rights of his men, demanding they be adequately clothed and armed, as well as to be paid all of the back-pay owed them. Probably for that reason, he would not be appointed as Governor of California later on.

When Alberni arrived at Nootka he had to rebuild the artillery battery fortification that had been dismantled after Martínez left. The reconstruction of the battery was difficult. It was built on top of a rocky island—tall but small. Embrasures had to be built to support the guns. It then took four days to emplace eight large cannons. Later, six smaller cannons were also emplaced. The battery did not have enough space for the remaining eight large cannon Eliza had brought, so they were stored ashore.

Alberni built barracks, a house for the commanding officers, a house for the captain, ovens, furnaces, an infirmary, and cultivated various fruits and vegetables to provide food supplies for the garrison. He was the first European to cultivate a vegetable garden in the modern-day British Columbia. He also made a registry of recorded temperatures, created a dictionary of 630 native words with their equivalents in Spanish, and brewed beer using conifer bark in an attempt to prevent scurvy. In short, he built, organized, and administrated the fort and land defenses of the Nootka settlement for the well-being of its inhabitants and the travelers that arrived at its port. Many of his men from the Catalan Company participated in exploration expeditions in Alaska and Juan de Fuca Strait, along with Spanish explorers from other companies.

All the data that Alberni compiled was later used by José Mariano Mociño, a New Spain-born naturalist, and the author of Noticias de Nootka (Spanish for "News from Nootka"), who was in the Bodega-Quadra expedition of 1792 and with Alessandro Malaspina in 1791 on his grand scientific voyage. According to Mociño, Alberni gained the esteem and respect of those around him, including the natives, whom he flattered with a poem, dedicated to their chief, Maquinna, with music of the Mambrú, a Spanish song, adapted from the French song Marlbrough s'en va-t-en guerre, originally from the War of the Spanish Succession. The lyrics of the song go:

Macuina, Macuina, Macuina,
He's a great prince, friend of us
Spain, Spain, Spain
Is friend of Macuina and Nootka

This song became so popular in the region, that José María Narváez heard it from the natives in the other side of Nootka Island and near Point Grey (Narváez arrived at what today is the city of Vancouver, one year before the English captain George Vancouver). Alberni's sojourn at Nootka coincided with a period of major activity of Spanish explorers and travelers from other nations in the region.

=== Return to Mexico ===
Once Alberni had accomplished his task, and after having been in the fort for two years, he received the order to return with his company to the Maritime Department of San Blas. He was given, by royal order through the Viceroy of New Spain Revillagigedo, the title of Governor and Commander of Arms of Fort San Miguel in Nootka Island.

In July 1792 he was named lieutenant-colonel, and after his assignment in Nootka, he was sent to the Castle of San Juan de Ulúa for eight months, in Veracruz, as commander of the fort and as Lieutenant-Colonel of the King for the Plaza de Veracruz. After that, Alberni was sent to Guadalajara for two years.

=== To California ===
In April 1796, by order of the Viceroy of New Spain Miguel de la Grúa Talamanca y Branciforte, marqués de Branciforte, he and his company of 72 men returned to California to take care of the four Spanish military garrisons of Monterey, Santa Barbara, San Diego and San Francisco. In 1800 he was appointed the Interim Governor of California and commander of the four military garrisons that Spain had in California, until a new governor was assigned. He remained in California until his death.

=== Death ===
Alberni died of dropsy at the age of 55 in Monterey, Alta California, on March 11, 1802. He was buried at the Royal Chapel of San Carlos in Monterey. Today, his remains probably lie under the highway that was built nearby, because his tomb was never found. Alberni's will, dated December 16, 1801, leaves everything to his wife, Juana Vélez, a native of Tepic, Mexico. The only daughter they had predeceased him. Sergeant Joaquín Tico from the Volunteers of Catalonia was executor of his will.

== Legacy ==
Alberni was a person with a strong, courageous, diplomatic character, who knew how to manage problems, even in difficult times. There are numerous places named after him in both Canada and Spain:

- Alberni Inlet, British Columbia, named by Francisco de Eliza.
- Port Alberni, British Columbia, named by Captain Richards from HMS Hecate in 1861. Port Alberni is at the head of Alberni Inlet.
- Alberni-Clayoquot Regional District, named after Port Alberni.
- Streets in the cities of Vancouver, Canada and Tortosa, Spain, among others.

== See also ==
- History of British Columbia
- List of pre-statehood governors of California
