= Santa Cruz de Nuca =

1789–1795 Spanish settlement on Vancouver Island

- Yuquot, British Columbia, Canada
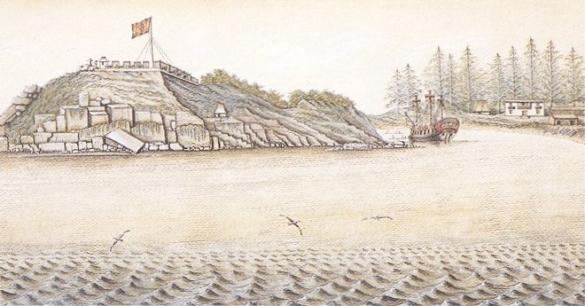
- Reconstruction of Fort San Miguel and Santa Cruz de Nuca

Site information
- Type: Colonial fortification
- Controlled by: Spanish Empire

Location
- Location within British Columbia
- Coordinates: 49°35′38″N 126°37′12″W

Site history
- Built: 1789
- In use: 1789–1795

Garrison information
- Past commanders: Pedro de Alberni

Santa Cruz de Nuca (or Nutca) was a Spanish colonial fort and settlement and the first European colony in what is now known as British Columbia. The settlement was founded on Vancouver Island in 1789 and abandoned in 1795, with its far northerly position making it the "high-water mark" of verified northerly Spanish settlement along the North American west coast. The colony was established with the Spanish aim of securing the entire west coast of the continent from Alaska southwards, for the Spanish crown.

Due to the presence and activities of several British maritime fur trading ships in the same region, and the Russian colonization of Alaska further north, this Spanish attempt at making such a substantial claim for possession and conquest along the North American west coast failed. The colony was briefly abandoned between October 1789 and April 1790. In 1795 the colony was permanently abandoned following the settlement and signing of the Nootka Convention. This final Spanish abandonment of the area left the Spanish missions in the San Francisco Bay area as the most northerly permanent Spanish settlements in western North America.

The Nootka Convention resolved the earlier armed international struggles which had surrounded the colony, including the Nootka Crisis, which had almost led to war between Britain and Spain. The colony had been protected by the adjacent Fort San Miguel. Santa Cruz de Nuca was the only verified Spanish settlement in what is now Canada. Some early Spanish maps had claimed the existence of additional Spanish settlements in the area. However, these other unverified local ghost-Spanish-settlements appear to have most probably been merely a "political fiction", created by Spanish cartographers with the aim of dissuading other nations from attempting to expand in the area.

== Early history (until 1778) ==
Yuquot (meaning "Wind comes from all directions") was the summer home of Chief Maquinna and the Mowachaht/Muchalaht (Nuu-chah-nulth) people for generations, housing approximately 1,500 natives in 20 traditional wooden longhouses. Captain James Cook's visit to Nootka Sound in 1778 was the second known European sighting of Yuquot after Juan José Pérez Hernández in 1774.

== Early European explorations and settlement (1778–1800s) ==
New Spain claimed the entire west coast of North America and therefore considered the Russian American fur trading activity in Alaska, which began in the middle to late 18th century, an encroachment and threat. Likewise, the exploration of the northwest coast by James Cook of the British Navy and the subsequent fur trading activities by British ships was considered an invasion of Spanish territory. To protect and strengthen its claim, New Spain sent a number of expeditions to the Pacific Northwest between 1774 and 1793.

In 1789 the Viceroy of New Spain, Manuel Antonio Flórez, instructed Esteban José Martínez to occupy Nootka Sound, on Vancouver Island in present-day British Columbia, build a settlement and fort, and to make it clear that Spain was setting up a formal establishment. The Russians were threatening to take the sound, and in May 1788 the British fur trader John Meares had used Nootka Sound as a base of operations and claimed purchase of land there from the indigenous Nuu-chah-nulth people. In 1788, John Meares, an English navigator and explorer sailing under falsified papers, sailed from China and explored Nootka Sound and the neighbouring coasts. He, among other claims subsequently discredited by George Vancouver in 1792, claimed to have bought some land from a local chief named Maquinna and built a trading post there.

=== First establishment of Santa Cruz de Nuca and Fort San Miguel ===
In 1789, the Spanish commander Esteban José Martínez led an expedition that arrived at Nootka Sound on May 5, 1789. This territory was already considered as part of New Spain by the Spanish due to the previous explorations of the region. On May 15, 1789, Martínez chose the location of his fortification and settlement at the entrance of Friendly Cove (Yuquot) on Hog Island. Work progressed so that on May 26 they were able to place their artillery followed by the construction of barracks and a powder storeroom. The new Santa Cruz de Nuca settlement included houses and a hospital.

During the summer of 1789, a number of fur trading vessels, British and American, arrived at Nootka. The American captains heeded warnings and left. On June 24, 1789 a salvo was fired from the new fort and the Spanish ships in what Martínez considered an official act of possession of Nootka Harbour. On July 4, the American vessels and their captains Robert Gray and John Kendrick (who had arrived in the harbour 7 months earlier than Martínez) fired salvos and fireworks in recognition of their recent independence from Britain accompanied by a further salvo from the Spanish fort.

On July 29, 1789, new orders arrived from Viceroy Flores directing Martínez to abandon Fort San Miguel and return to San Blas. The artillery from the fort was loaded back aboard Princesa Real and he left Friendly Cove on October 30, 1789. The fort was dismantled, but anticipating a reoccupation, Martínez buried crates of bricks and lime.

== Nootka Crisis ==
Martínez arrived at Nootka Sound on May 5, 1789. He found three ships already there. Two were American, the Columbia Rediviva and the Lady Washington, which had wintered at Nootka Sound. The British ship was the Iphigenia. It was seized and its captain, William Douglas, arrested. After a few days Martínez released Douglas and his ship and ordered him to leave and not return. Douglas heeded the warning.

On June 8, the North West America, under Robert Funter, arrived at Nootka Sound and was seized by Martínez. The sloop was renamed Santa Gertrudis la Magna and used for exploring the region. José María Narváez was given command and sailed far into the Strait of Juan de Fuca. Martínez later claimed that Funter had abandoned the vessel. Martínez had given supplies to the Iphigenia and claimed his seizure of the North West America was for the purpose of holding the vessel as a security for the money owed by Meares's company for the supplies.

On June 24, in front of the British and Americans present at Nootka Sound, Martínez performed a formal act of sovereignty, taking possession of the entire northwest coast for Spain.

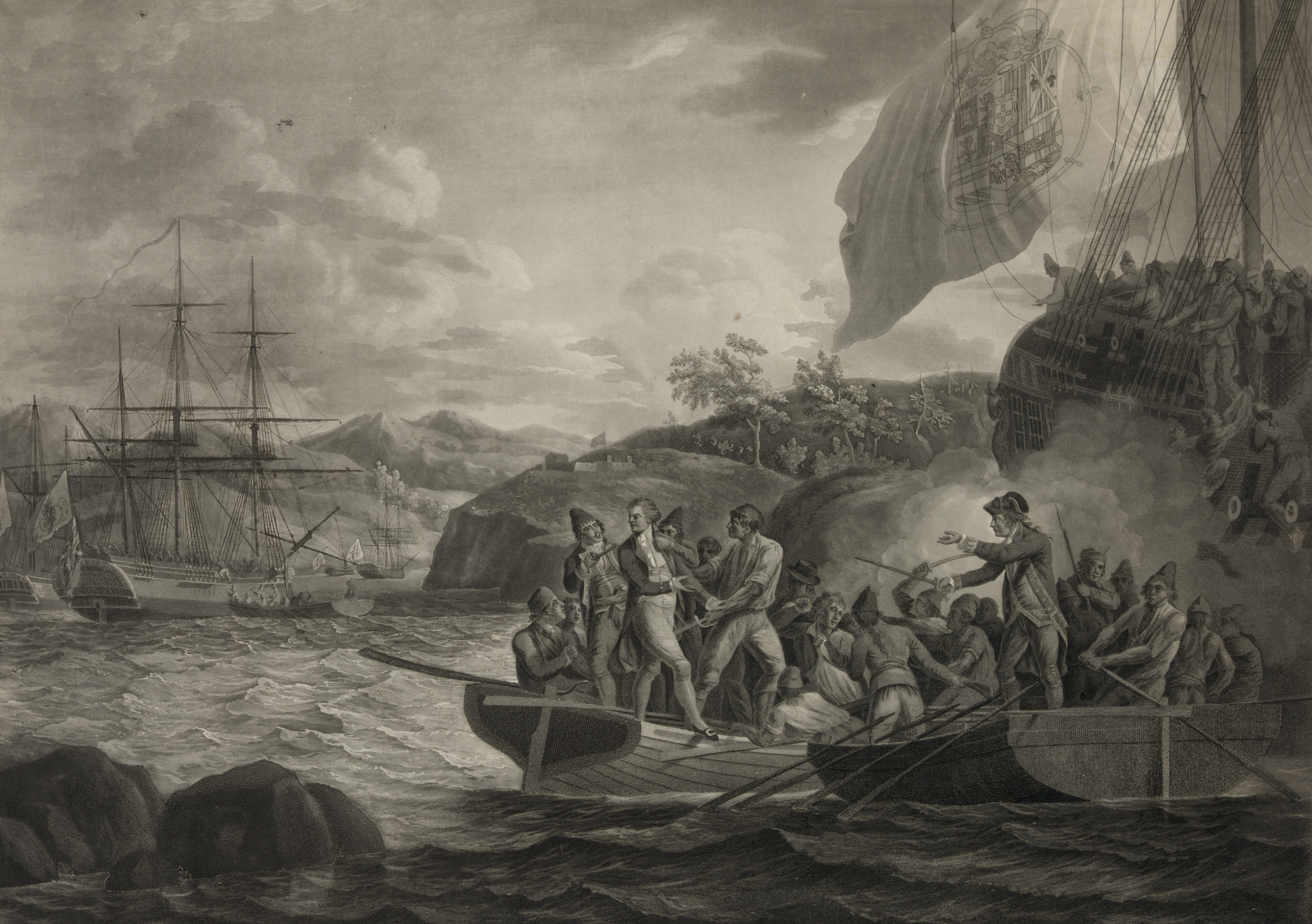
Seizure of Capt. Colnett

On July 2, the British ships Princess Royal and Argonaut arrived. The Princess Royal was first, and Martínez ordered its captain, Thomas Hudson, to abandon the area and return to China, based on Spain's territorial and navigation rights. Later in the day the Argonaut arrived, and Martínez seized the ship and arrested Colnett, his crew, and the Chinese workers Colnett had brought. In addition to the Chinese workers, the Argonaut carried a considerable amount of equipment. Colnett said that he was intending to build a settlement at Nootka Sound, which was considered a violation of Spanish sovereignty. After a hot-tempered argument Martínez arrested Colnett.

Later, Martínez used the Chinese workforce to build Fort San Miguel and otherwise improve the Spanish post. The Argonaut also carried materials for the construction of a new ship. After Narváez returned in the Santa Gertrudis la Magna (the seized and renamed North West America), the materials from the Argonaut were used to improve the vessel. By the end of 1789 the Santa Gertrudis la Magna was in San Blas, where it was dismantled. The pieces were taken back to Nootka Sound in 1790 by Francisco de Eliza and used to build a schooner, christened Santa Saturnina. This vessel, the third incarnation of the North West America, was used by Narváez during his 1791 exploration of the Strait of Georgia.

On July 12, Hudson returned to Nootka Sound with the Princess Royal. He did not intend to enter but was becalmed. This was seen as a provocation and he was seized by the Spanish.

The Nuu-chah-nulth, indigenous to Nootka Sound, observed but did not understand the disputes between the Spanish and British. On July 13, one of the Nuu-chah-nulth leaders, Callicum, the son of Maquinna, went to meet with Martínez, who was on board the newly captured Princess Royal. Callicum's attitude and angry calls alarmed the Spanish and somehow Callicum ended up shot dead. Sources differ over exactly how this happened. Some say that Martínez fired a warning shot and a nearby Spanish sailor, thinking Martínez meant to kill and missed, fired as well and killed Callicum. Another source says that Martínez aimed to hit Callicum but his musket misfired and another sailor fired his musket and killed Callicum. Sources also differ over what Callicum was angry about, whether it was the seizing of ships, or something else. In any case the event caused a rift between the Spanish and the Nuu-chah-nulth. Maquinna, in fear of his life, fled to Clayoquot Sound and moved with his people from Yuquot to Aoxsha.

On July 14 the Argonaut set sail for San Blas, with a Spanish crew and Colnett and his crew as prisoners. Two weeks later the Princess Royal followed, with the San Carlos (el Filipino) as an escort.

The American ships Columbia Rediviva and Lady Washington, also fur trading, were in the area all summer, sometimes anchored in Friendly Cove. Martínez left them alone even though his instructions were to prevent ships of any nation from trading at Nootka Sound. The captured crew of the North West America was sent to the Columbia before the Americans set sail for China.

Two other American ships arrived at Nootka Sound late in the season. The Fair American, under Thomas Humphrey Metcalfe, was captured by Martínez upon arrival. Its sister ship, the Eleanora, under Humphrey's father, Simon Metcalfe, was nearly captured but escaped.

On July 29, 1789 the Spanish supply ship Aranzazu arrived from San Blas with orders from Viceroy Flores to evacuate Nootka Sound by the end of the year. By the end of October the Spanish had completely abandoned Nootka Sound. They returned to San Blas with the Princess Royal and the Argonaut, with their captains and crews as prisoners, as well as the Fair American. The captured North West America, renamed Santa Gertrudis la Magna, returned to San Blas separately. The Fair American was released in early 1790 without much notice. The Nootka Incident did not spark a crisis in the relationship of the United States and Spain.

== Second establishment of Santa Cruz de Nuca and Fort San Miguel ==
By late 1789 Viceroy Flórez had already been replaced with a new viceroy, Juan Vicente de Güemes, 2nd Count of Revillagigedo, who was determined to continue defending the Spanish rights to the area, including settling Nootka Sound and the Pacific Northwest coast in general. Martínez, who had enjoyed the favor of Flórez, became a scapegoat under the new regime. Martínez lost favor due to his actions in the incident, and with the appointment of the new Viceroy, Juan Vicente de Güemes.

In 1790 a new Spanish expedition under Francisco de Eliza reoccupied Nootka Sound, followed by Alessandro Malaspina in 1791 and Juan Francisco de la Bodega y Quadra diplomatically implementing the Nootka Conventions in 1792. The senior commander of the Spanish naval base at San Blas, Juan Francisco de la Bodega y Quadra, replaced Martínez as the primary Spaniard in charge of Nootka Sound and the northwest coast. A new expedition was organized and in early 1790 Nootka Sound was reoccupied by the Spanish, under the command of Francisco de Eliza. The fleet sent to Nootka Sound in 1790 was the largest Spanish force yet sent to the northwest.

Some months later, Manuel Antonio Flores, Viceroy of New Spain, ordered Francisco de Eliza to rebuild enlarge the fort and settlement. The expedition, composed of three ships, the Concepción, under the command of de Eliza, the San Carlos, under the command of Salvador Fidalgo and Princesa Real, under the command of Manuel Quimper, sailed in early 1790 from San Blas in Nueva Galicia and arrived at Nootka Sound in April of that year. The expedition had 80 Catalan volunteers from the First Free Company of Volunteers of Catalonia, commanded by Pere d'Alberní, a native of Tortosa. The expedition rebuilt the fort, which had been dismantled after Martínez abandoned it. The rebuilt fort included several defensive constructions as well as a vegetable garden to ensure the settlement had food supplies. The colony was reasonably large, including several dwellings, a brewery (the first in British Columbia), a hospital, and a house for the governor.

Three lines of defence were established to defend Santa Cruz de Nuca and the harbour: the 300-ton frigate Concepción, the soldiers under Alberni on land and on the frigate, and the rebuilding of the battery on San Miguel Island. The construction of the battery was difficult. It was built on top of a rocky island—tall but small. Embrasures had to be built to support the guns. It then took four days to emplace eight large cannons. Later, six smaller cannons were also emplaced. The battery did not have enough space for the remaining eight large cannon Eliza had brought, so they were stored ashore.

Another outpost, intended to replace Santa Cruz de Nuca, was partially built at Neah Bay on the southern side of the Strait of Juan de Fuca in what is now the U.S. state of Washington. Neah Bay was known as Bahía de Núñez Gaona in New Spain, and the outpost there was referred to as "Fuca". It was abandoned, partially finished, in 1792. Its personnel, livestock, cannons, and ammunition were transferred to Nuca.

When the news reached London in January, 1790. Britain requested compensation and the Spanish government refused. Both sides prepared for war and sought assistance from allies. The crisis was resolved peacefully but with difficulty through a set of three agreements, known collectively as the Nootka Conventions. Spain agreed to share some rights to settle along the Pacific coast but kept its main Pacific claims. The outcome was considered a victory for mercantile interests of Britain and opened the way to certain British expansion in the Pacific. However, Spain continued to colonize and settle the Pacific coast, especially present-day California, until 1821.

In April 1790 John Meares arrived in England, confirmed various rumors, claimed to have bought land and built a settlement at Nootka before Martínez, and generally fanned the flames of anti-Spanish feelings. In May the issue was taken up in the House of Commons as the Royal Navy began to make preparations for hostilities. An ultimatum was delivered to Spain.

Meares published an account of his Voyages in 1790, which gained widespread attention, especially in light of the developing Nootka Crisis. Meares not only described his voyages to the northwest coast, but put forward a grand vision of a new economic network based in the Pacific, joining in trade widely separated regions such as the Pacific Northwest, China, Japan, Hawaii, and England. This idea tried to imitate Spain's centuries-old Pacific and Atlantic trade networks of the Manila galleons and Atlantic treasure fleets which linked Asia and the Philippines with North America and Spain since the 16th century. Meares' vision required a loosening of the monopolistic power of the East India Company and the South Sea Company, which between them controlled all British trade in the Pacific. Meares argued strongly for loosening their power. His vision eventually came to pass, in its general form, but not before the long struggle of the Napoleonic Wars was over.

Both Britain and Spain sent powerful fleets of warships towards each other in a show of force. There was a chance of open warfare had the fleets encountered one another, but they did not.

== Nootka Conventions ==
The first Nootka Convention, called the Nootka Sound Convention, resolved the crisis in general. The convention held that the northwest coast would be open to traders of both Britain and Spain, that the captured British ships would be returned and an indemnity paid. It also held that the land owned by the British at Nootka Sound would be restored, which proved difficult to carry out. The Spanish claimed that the only such land was the small parcel where Meares had built the North West America. The British held that Meares had in fact purchased the whole of Nootka Sound from Maquinna, as well as some land to the south. Until the details were worked out, which took several years, Spain retained control of Nootka Sound and continued to garrison the fort at Friendly Cove. Complicating the issue was the changing role of the Nuu-chah-nulth in relation to Britain and Spain. The Nuu-chah-nulth had become highly suspicious and hostile toward Spain following the 1789 killing of Callicum. But the Spanish worked hard to improve the relationship, and by the time of Nootka Conventions were to be carried out the Nuu-chah-nulth were essentially allied with the Spanish. This development came about in a large degree due to the efforts by Alessandro Malaspina and his officers during his month-long stay at Nootka Sound in 1791. Malaspina was able to regain the trust of Maquinna and the promise that the Spanish had the rightful title of land ownership at Nootka Sound.

Negotiations between Britain and Spain over the details of the Nootka Convention were to take place at Nootka Sound in the summer of 1792, for which purpose Juan Francisco de la Bodega y Quadra came. The British negotiator was George Vancouver, who arrived on August 28, 1792.

Although Vancouver and Bodega y Quadra were friendly with one another, their negotiations did not go smoothly. Spain desired to set the Spanish-British boundary at the Strait of Juan de Fuca, but Vancouver insisted on British rights to the Columbia River. Vancouver also objected to the new Spanish post at Neah Bay. Bodega y Quadra insisted on Spain retaining Nootka Sound, which Vancouver could not accept. In the end the two agreed to refer the matter to their respective governments.

By 1793 Britain and Spain had become allies in a war against France. The issues of the Nootka Crisis had become less important. An agreement was signed on January 11, 1794, under which both nations agreed to abandon Nootka Sound, with a ceremonial transfer of the post at Friendly Cove to the British.

The official transfer occurred on March 28, 1795. General Álava represented Spain and Lieutenant Thomas Pearce Britain. The British flag was ceremoniously raised and lowered. Afterwards, Pearce presented the flag to Maquinna and asked him to raise it whenever a ship appeared.

Under the Nootka Convention, Britain and Spain agreed not to establish any permanent base at Nootka Sound, but ships from either nation could visit. The two nations also agreed to prevent any other nation from establishing sovereignty.

The Nootka Conventions of the 1790s, carried out in part by George Vancouver and his Spanish counterpart Juan Francisco de la Bodega y Quadra, prevented the dispute from escalating to war. The first Convention was signed on October 28, 1790. and was purposefully vague. Its preamble contained the statement, "setting aside all retrospective discussions of the rights and pretensions of the two parties...". Its first article said that all "the buildings and tracts of land" at Nootka Sound which had been seized by Martínez would be restored to Britain. For this purpose Vancouver and Bodega y Quadra were sent to Nootka Sound in 1792. However, no buildings had been seized and Bodega said no land had been acquired by the British, as attested by the indigenous chief Maquinna as well as the American traders Robert Gray and Joseph Ingraham, who were present in 1789. Vancouver was unwilling to accept Bodega's various counter-offers and the whole matter was sent back to the British and Spanish governments.

=== First Nootka Convention ===
The first Nootka Convention plays a role in the Falkland Islands sovereignty dispute between the United Kingdom and Argentina. Article VI provided that neither party would form new establishments on any of the islands adjacent to the east and west coasts of South America then occupied by Spain. Both retained the right to land and erect temporary structures on the coasts and islands for fishery-related purposes. However, there was an additional secret article which stipulated that Article VI shall remain in force only so long as no establishment shall have been formed by the subjects of any other power on the coasts in question. This secret article had the same force as if it were inserted in the convention. The Nootka Convention's applicability to the Falklands dispute is controversial and complicated. The United Provinces of the River Plate was not a party to the convention. Therefore, it is defined in the convention as 'other power' and the occupation of the settlement (at Port Louis) by subjects of any other power negated Article VI and allowed Great Britain to re-assert prior sovereignty and form new settlements.

=== Second Nootka Convention ===
The second Nootka Convention, known as the Nootka Claims Convention, was signed in February 1793 and awarded compensation to John Meares for the Spanish seizure of his ships at Nootka in 1789.

=== Third Nootka Convention ===
The third Nootka Convention also known as the Convention for the Mutual Abandonment of Nootka, was signed on January 11, 1794. It called for the mutual abandonment of Nootka Sound. Britain and Spain were both free to use Nootka Sound as a port and erect temporary structures, but, "neither ... shall form any permanent establishment in the said port or claim any right of sovereignty or territorial dominion there to the exclusion of the other. And Their said Majesties will mutually aid each other to maintain for their subjects free access to the port of Nootka against any other nation which may attempt to establish there any sovereignty or dominion".

== Nootka Convention and the abandonment of Santa Cruz de Nuca ==
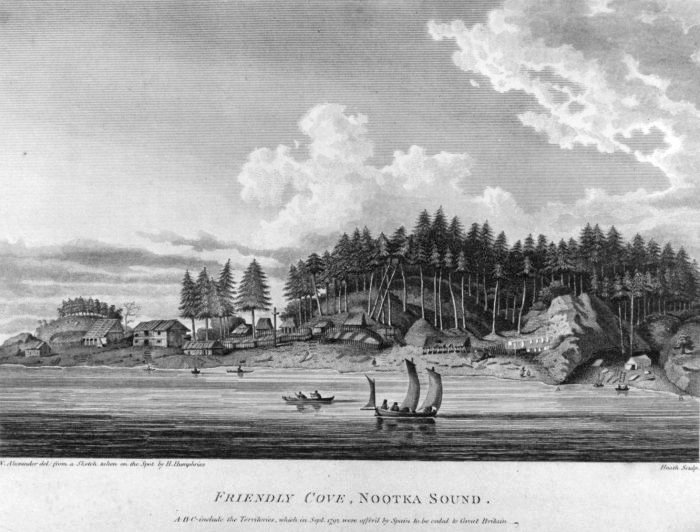
Friendly Cove, Nootka Sound. Volume I, plate VII from: A Voyage of Discovery to the North Pacific Ocean and Round the World by George Vancouver.

The Nootka Conventions are sometimes described as a commitment by Spain to withdraw from the northwest coast, but there was no such requirement.

In the larger scheme of things the Nootka Conventions weakened the notion that a country could claim exclusive sovereignty without establishing settlements. It was not enough to claim territory by a grant of the Pope, or by "right of first discovery". Claims had to be backed up with some kind of actual occupation.

The outcome of the crisis was a humiliation for Spain and a triumph for Britain, as Spain had practically renounced all sovereignty on the North Pacific coast. The British did not win all of the points they had sought. Their merchants were still restricted from trading directly with Spanish America and no northern boundary of Spanish America was set. Nevertheless, in the aftermath of the Nootka Crisis, Britain became the dominant power in the Pacific.

Spanish rights in the Pacific Northwest were later acquired by the United States via the Adams–Onís Treaty, signed in 1819. The United States argued that it acquired exclusive sovereignty from Spain, which became a key part of the American position during the Oregon boundary dispute. In countering the US claim of exclusive sovereignty the British cited the Nootka Conventions. This dispute was not resolved until the signing of the Oregon Treaty in 1846, dividing the disputed territory, and establishing what later became the current international boundary between Canada and the United States.

The first Nootka Convention averted the war but left many specific issues unresolved. Both sides sought to define a northern boundary for New Spain. At Nootka Sound, the diplomatic representative of New Spain, Juan Francisco de la Bodega y Quadra, proposed a boundary at the Strait of Juan de Fuca, but the British representative, George Vancouver refused to accept any boundary north of San Francisco. No agreement could be reached and the northern boundary of New Spain remained unspecified until the Adams–Onís Treaty with the United States (1819). That treaty also ceded Spanish Florida to the United States.

The Catalan volunteers left the fort in 1792 and Spanish influence in the region ended in 1795 after the third Nootka Convention came into force and Santa Cruz de Nuca was finally abandoned.

== Modern era ==
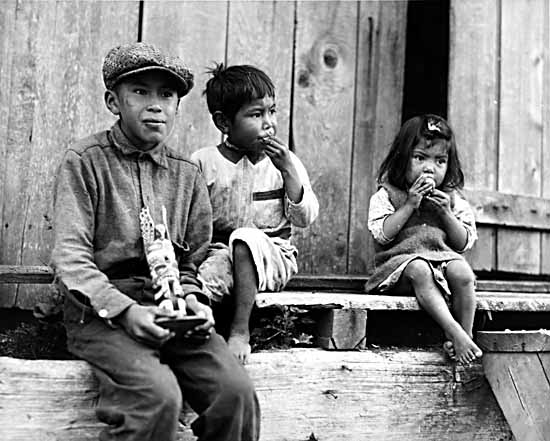
Three Nuu-chah-nulth children in Yuquot, 1930s

Before being occupied by Spain the site had been the Mowachaht summer village of Yuquot. It was reoccupied by the Mowachaht under Chief Maquinna. Remnants of the Spanish post, including its kitchen garden, were still visible when John R. Jewitt, an English captive of Maquinna, lived there in 1803-1805.

In 1957, the Spanish government presented stained glass windows commemorating the Nootka conventions to the church of Yuquot as a gift to the Nuu-chah-nulth people.,

Yuquot (or Friendly Cove) is a small settlement of less than 25. The Canadian government declared Yuquot a National Historic Site in 1923, with recognition of the significance of the First Nations history following in 1997. Efforts are underway to add Yuquot/Santa Cruz de Nuca as a British Columbia Provincial Historic Site.

== See also ==
- History of British Columbia
- History of the west coast of North America
- Spanish expeditions to the Pacific Northwest
- Fort San Miguel
