= Maquinna =

Politician

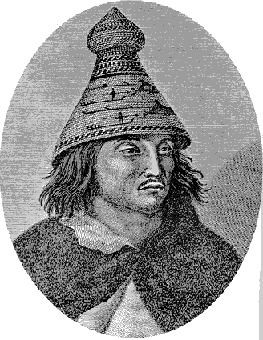
Chief Maquinna, Mowachaht Chief

Maquinna (also transliterated Muquinna, Macuina, Maquilla from m̓ukʷina in Nuu-chah-nulth) was the chief of the Nuu-chah-nulth people of Nootka Sound, during the heyday of the maritime fur trade in the 1780s and 1790s on the Pacific Northwest Coast. The name means "possessor of pebbles". His people are today known as the Mowachaht and reside today with their kin, the Muchalaht, at Gold River, British Columbia, Canada.

== History ==
Maquinna was a powerful chief whose summer coastal village, Yuquot, became the first important anchorage in the European jockeying for power and commerce as the era of the maritime fur trade began. Yuquot became known as Friendly Cove after the British explorer Captain James Cook visited in 1778. Cook did not record the name of the chief of Yuquot, who may not have been Maquinna in 1778, even though writers have often assumed it was. Imperial Spain had sent two voyages to the region before Cook's visit, including Juan Pérez, who in 1774 had anchored in or near the entrance of Nootka Sound. In response to Russian activity in Alaska and the increasing visits by British fur-traders, Spain, which claimed the coast from Mexico to Alaska, asserted its authority by launching further voyages to the Pacific Northwest, including scientific and surveying expeditions. In 1788, John Meares explored Nootka Sound and the neighboring coasts and claimed to have bought some land from Maquinna, where he built a trading post. In 1789, Esteban José Martínez of the Spanish Navy occupied and claimed Nootka Sound for Spain. He built Fort San Miguel and a settlement called Santa Cruz de Nuca. Ensuing events led to Martínez's seizure of the British subject James Colnett and several British ships, which provoked an international episode known as the Nootka Crisis.

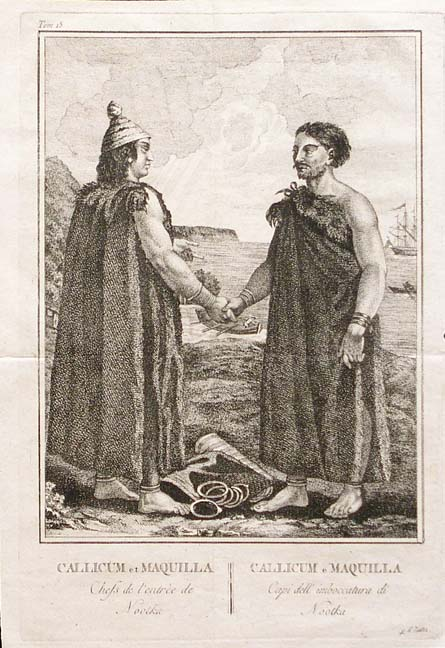
Callicum and Maquinna from the Italian translation of John Meares' Voyages (Naples 1796)

The Spanish settlement and fort were abandoned at the end of 1789 and rebuilt one year later, in 1790, by Francisco de Eliza and Pere d'Alberní i Teixidor. Both were abandoned in 1795 after the third Nootka Convention came into force. Maquinna and his people reoccupied their coastal village.

Maquinna played a key role in relations between the Spanish envoy, Juan Francisco de la Bodega y Quadra, and his British counterpart, Captain George Vancouver, who negotiated the settlement of the Nootka affair and enjoyed Maquinna's hospitality at length. The title by which he is described, "Hyas Tyee", which was to find its way into the vocabulary of the Chinook Jargon, is the same as that used for king (although it simply means important chief).

One story tells how he and his people performed a masquerade for Vancouver and Bodega y Quadra in which the noble brothers acted out a pantomime of European dress and manners, improvising mock-Spanish and mock-English dialogue, all set in the customary style of the great potlatch theatre-dance culture of the Northwest Coast. Maquinna also had an army of 300–400 men.

Relations were not always easy. Maquinna's brother Callicum (sometimes spelled Kelekem) expressed his anger at the Spanish seizure of British ships in 1789 and was shot dead by Esteban José Martínez or one of Martínez's sailors.

Maquinna worshipped at the Yuquot Whalers Shrine, performing ritual purification to gain spiritual strength to hunt whales and attract drift whales to his beaches.

== European slaves ==
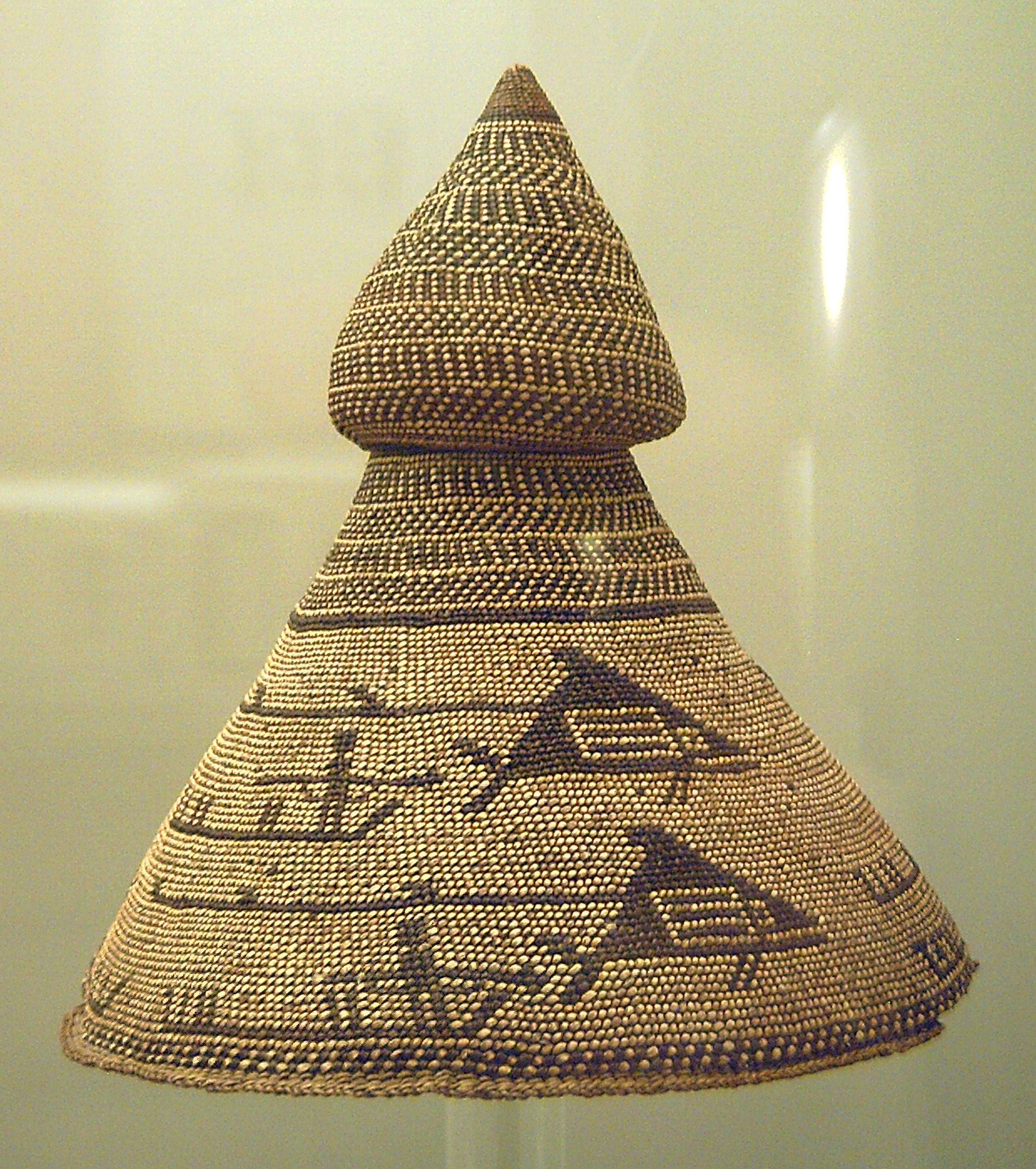
Maquinna's hat in the Museum of the Americas in Madrid

Maquinna is notable also for having kept European slaves on a number of occasions. The most detailed account is told in the writings of John R. Jewitt, one of two slaves kept for several years after the crew of the ship Boston was massacred by Maquinna and his men. A Narrative of the Adventures and Sufferings of John R. Jewitt, only survivor of the crew of the ship Boston, during a captivity of nearly three years among the savages of Nootka Sound: with an account of the manners, mode of living, and religious opinions of the natives is one of the first published glimpses into the social and cultural life of the Pacific Northwest peoples. Jewitt refers to Maquinna throughout as "king" and those beneath him as "chiefs". Maquinna required Jewitt to learn the Nuu-chah-nulth language, and told him that the ship Boston was taken in response to several depredations committed by earlier American and Spanish visitors. Jewitt was rescued in 1805 by Samuel Hill, captain of the brig Lydia.

The Narrative also describes an earlier, less fortunate, group of European slaves who were eventually sentenced to death by Maquinna after they attempted to escape to the lands of the Tla-o-qui-aht (Clayoquot) whose chief was Maquinna's rival, Wickaninnish. The one slave who had not tried to escape was eventually sold to Chief Wickaninnish and reportedly died shortly after hearing of the taking of the Boston.

== Legacy ==
Maquinna has been memorialized in various ways:

- Maquinna Marine Provincial Park, which contains Hot Springs Cove.
- Maquinna Elementary School in Port Alberni.
- Chief Maquinna Elementary School in Vancouver.
- Maquinna is an active submarine mud volcano located 16-18 kilometers west of Vancouver Island.
- A Northwest Indian Heritage Dollar featuring Maquinna was issued in 1977.
