= Bligh Island (Canada) =

Island in British Columbia, Canada

Coordinates: 49°39′46″N 126°31′03.8″W

Bligh Island is an island of the Nootka Sound area in British Columbia (Canada); it is adjacent to Nootka Island and Vancouver Island.

The island was named after William Bligh, of future HMS Bounty fame, who served as Master aboard ship during James Cook's third world voyage. The southern portion of the island is included within Bligh Island Marine Provincial Park.
