= Bligh Island =

Bligh Island may refer to several places named after British navigator William Bligh:

- Bligh Island (Alaska), Prince William Sound, Alaska
- Bligh Island (Canada), Nootka Sound, Canada
- Bligh Island, a.k.a. Ureparapara, Banks group, Vanuatu
