= Francisco de Eliza =

Spanish naval officer, navigator, and explorer

Francisco de Eliza y Reventa (1759 – February 19, 1825) was a Spanish naval officer, navigator, and explorer. He is remembered mainly for his work in the Pacific Northwest. He was the commandant of the Spanish post in Nootka Sound on Vancouver Island, and led or dispatched several exploration voyages in the region, including through the Strait of Juan de Fuca and the Strait of Georgia.

== Early life ==
Francisco de Eliza was born in El Puerto de Santa María, Spain, in 1759. He began his career with the Spanish Navy in 1773, graduating from the Real Compañía de Guardia Marinas (Royal Company of Maritime Guards) in Cádiz. In 1775 he served in the Spanish expedition against Algiers. He was sent to America in 1780 and later took part in the capture of Pensacola, Florida during the American Revolution.

== Pacific Northwest ==
=== Nootka Sound and the Nuu-chah-nulth ===
In 1789 Eliza and several other officers were chosen by Juan Francisco de la Bodega y Quadra to serve at San Blas, the naval station on the west coast of Mexico, then part of New Spain. Bodega y Quadra was the newly appointed commandant of San Blas. The San Blas naval department was responsible for supporting and exploring the coast north of Mexico, including Alta California and the Pacific Northwest to southern Alaska. The viceroy of New Spain, Juan Vicente de Güemes, Count of Revillagigedo, gave Eliza command of an expedition to reoccupy the Spanish establishment at Nootka Sound on Vancouver Island. The outpost, which the Spanish called Santa Cruz de Nuca, had been established by Esteban José Martínez in 1789 and then abandoned in October of the same year, after the "Nootka Incident", which triggered an international crisis between Spain and Great Britain known as the Nootka Crisis.

The King of Spain, Carlos IV, issued the Royal Order of April 14, 1789, requiring the establishment at Nootka Sound be maintained with "honour and firmness". Neither the king nor Viceroy Revillagigedo nor Bodega y Quadra was aware of the abandonment of the post at Nootka until December 1789, when Martínez arrived at San Blas. Eliza's expedition to relieve Martínez at Nootka became one to reoccupy the site and establish a permanent settlement.

Eliza sailed to Nootka Sound in command of the ships Concepción, San Carlos (el Filipino), and Princesa Real (formerly the British ship Princess Royal), arriving on April 3, 1790. There were no Europeans present when they arrived. For several years the Spanish pressed their territorial claims to the Pacific Northwest, with Nootka Sound, Francisco Eliza, and other Spanish commanders playing key roles. In addition to the sailing crews of the three ships, Eliza's expedition included 76 soldiers of the Free Company of Volunteers of Catalonia, under the command of Pere d'Alberni. This group of people constructed a small fort, and various buildings, planted a garden, and began to organize exploring parties. The outpost was built on a small sheltered cove inside Nootka Sound, called Friendly Cove by the English and Puerto de la Santa Cruz de Nuca by the Spanish (today it is Yuquot, British Columbia). Some Spanish maps show it as Cala de Los Amigos, a translation of the English name. The small fort built by the Spanish was called San Miguel, and was located on a small island at the entrance to the cove.

In May 1790 two exploring voyages were dispatched by Eliza. Salvador Fidalgo made a voyage north to visit the Russian outposts in Alaska, while Manuel Quimper examined the Strait of Juan de Fuca. Quimper's pilot was Gonzalo López de Haro. Some of the important sites found and charted during Quimper's expedition include Neah Bay, Esquimalt Harbour, Admiralty Inlet, Haro Strait, Rosario Strait, and Deception Pass.

The relationship between the Spanish and the Nootka natives (Nuu-chah-nulth) was tense. The year before Eliza arrived a Nootka chief, Callicum, had been killed by the Spanish. Several hostile encounters occurred while Eliza's party was building their settlement. On one occasion, five Nootkas were killed. Nonetheless, Eliza was able to improve the relationship somewhat. At least some of the Nootkas grew friendlier and provided assistance to the Spanish.

The winter of 1790-1791 was difficult for the Spanish under Eliza. A lack of fresh food resulted in outbreaks of scurvy. During the winter 9 men died and 32 more, too sick to remain, were sent to California to recover.

=== Straits of Georgia and Juan de Fuca ===
Further exploration voyages were undertaken in 1791. During the winter Spain had proposed to Great Britain that the Strait of Juan de Fuca could serve as the boundary between Spanish and British territory. If accepted, Spain would have to relocate its Nootka Sound post to a site south of the Strait. This, in addition to the need for a better understanding of the Strait's geography led the viceroy of New Spain to order another exploring expedition, this time led by Francisco Eliza himself.

In early May, Eliza set out in command of the San Carlos, with Juan Pantoja and José Antonio Verdía as first and second pilots. The San Carlos was accompanied by the small schooner, the Santa Saturnina, nicknamed La Orcasitas and under the command of José María Narváez, with Juan Carrasco as pilot.

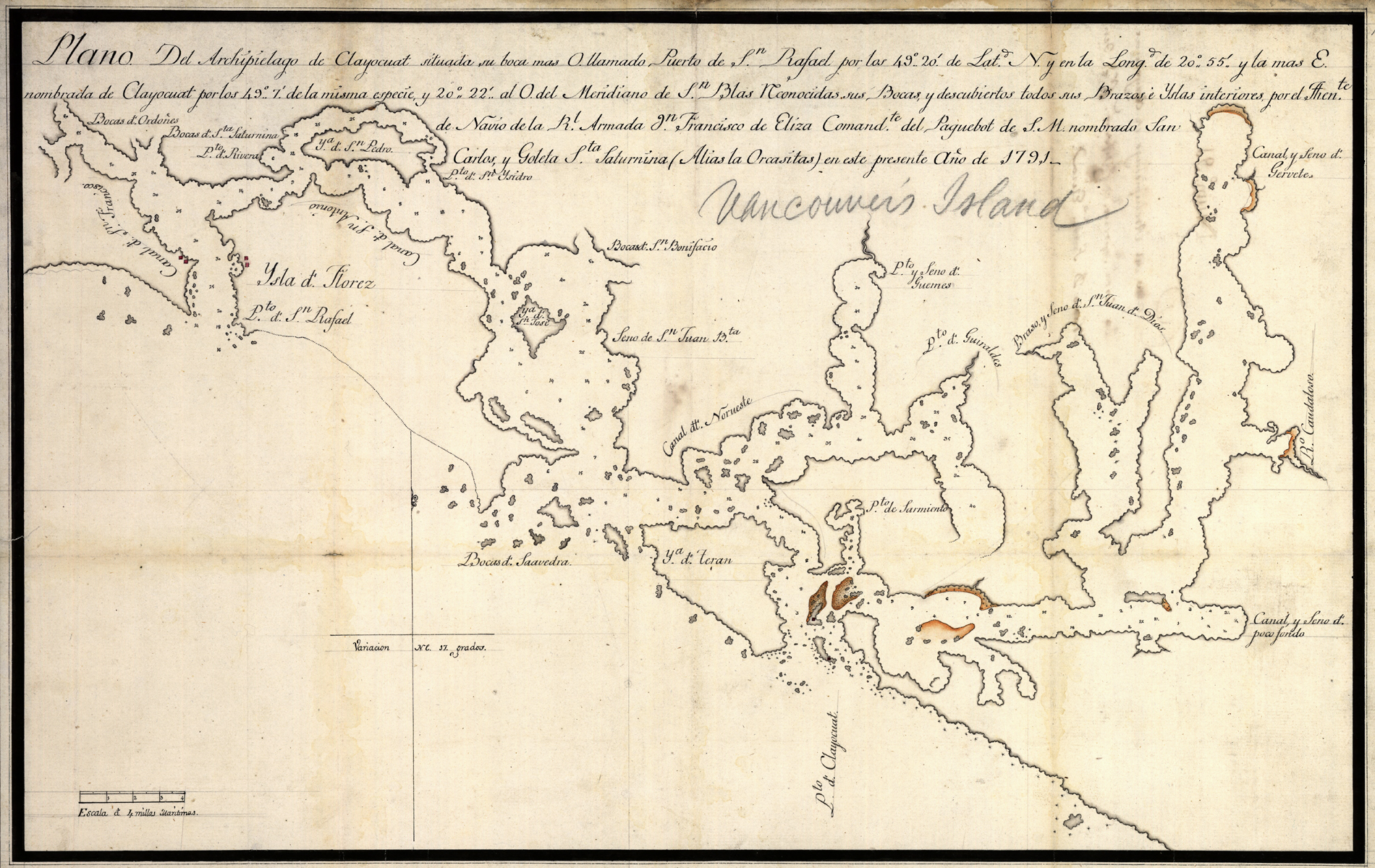
Plano del Archipielago de Clayocuat, prepared during Francisco Eliza's 1791 expedition

Narváez explored the inner waters of Clayoquot Sound and Barkley Sound while Eliza, investigating the outer edge of Clayoquot Sound, met and befriended Wickaninnish, chief of the Tla-o-qui-aht people. Narváez and Eliza entered the Strait of Juan de Fuca separately, rejoining at Esquimalt (called "Cordova" by the Spanish) on June 11, 1791. Eliza's pilots then took the Santa Saturnina and a longboat and spent ten days exploring Haro Strait and the found it opened up into a wide body of water to the north. This was the Strait of Georgia, which was previously unknown to Europeans. Eliza remained at Esquimalt during this time. After the pilots returned to Eliza and reported their findings, a longer exploration expedition was fitted out. Narváez led the voyage in the Santa Saturnina. Eliza considered taking the San Carlos along, but his pilots convinced him of that the larger ship would find the narrow channels hazardous. In addition, Eliza fell sick. The entire expedition moved its base of operations from Esquimalt to Port Discovery ("Puerto de Quadra" to the Spanish). Then on July 1, 1791, Narváez, with Carrasco, sailed north, passing through Rosario Strait, past Bellingham Bay, and into the Strait of Georgia.

For three weeks they followed the Strait northward, reaching as far as Texada Island, which they gave the name "Isla de Texada". They noted various inlets which, along with the presence of whales led Eliza to think, correctly, that there was another passage to the open ocean. Although the idea of a Northwest Passage to the Atlantic Ocean was by this time an extremely remote possibility, the inlets of the Strait of Georgia rekindled the hope, which led to the 1792 expedition of Dionisio Alcalá Galiano and Cayetano Valdes. A rough map of the Strait of Georgia produced from the voyage of Santa Saturnina showed a particularly large opening to the east. Eliza's report stated that if a Northwest Passage existed at all, it must lie beyond this opening. The Spanish named the inlet "Canal Floridablanca", the investigation of which was made a priority for the expedition of Galiano and Valdes. It turned out to be the mouth of the Fraser River. The Santa Saturnina had been too far offshore to see the low-lying land.

At the start of Narváez's voyage the Santa Saturnina passed Admiralty Inlet, the entrance to Puget Sound (called "Ensenada de Caamaño" by the Spanish). Narváez saw that it was a large channel leading to the south and planned to explore it after returning from the north. But the Strait of Georgia proved larger than expected and Narváez ran out of food, the Santa Saturnina being very small. Narváez had to return directly to Port Discovery, and then Eliza was eager to then return to Nootka Sound and send a report about the Strait of Georgia. The Spanish thus missed the opportunity of preempting the British exploration of Puget Sound, which took place a year later under George Vancouver.

While sailing back to Nootka Sound Eliza's expedition entered the deep harbor of present-day Port Angeles and gave it the name "Puerto de Nuestra Señora de Los Angeles". Eliza, with Narváez in the San Carlos, returned to Nootka Sound in August, 1791. The Santa Saturnina, under Carrasco during the return to Nootka, was unable to beat upwind to Nootka and instead sailed to Monterey, California.

Over time Eliza has received most of the credit for the discoveries made and places named during the 1791 expedition, but he actually did no exploring himself. Most of the credit should go to his pilots Narváez, Carrasco, Pantoja, and Verdía.

The winter of 1791-1792 was easier than the previous one. Shipments of food from Mexico and assistance from the Nootkas helped Eliza's small outpost survive.

On July 24, 1792, Francisco de Eliza left Nootka Sound for Mexico, having completed his mission of re-establishing the Spanish outpost there. The position of commandant at Nootka Sound passed to Juan Francisco de la Bodega y Quadra.

== Later life ==
In 1793 Eliza commanded an expedition that explored the coast of California. From 1795 to 1801 he was the commander of the naval base at San Blas. In 1803 he was transferred to Cádiz, Spain.

Eliza continued to serve in the Spanish navy. When Spain was occupied by Napoleon from 1808 to 1814, Eliza held a number of political posts at Cádiz.

== Legacy ==
Eliza Island was named in his honor.
