= Bligh Island Marine Provincial Park =

Provincial park in British Columbia, Canada

- IUCN category II (national park)
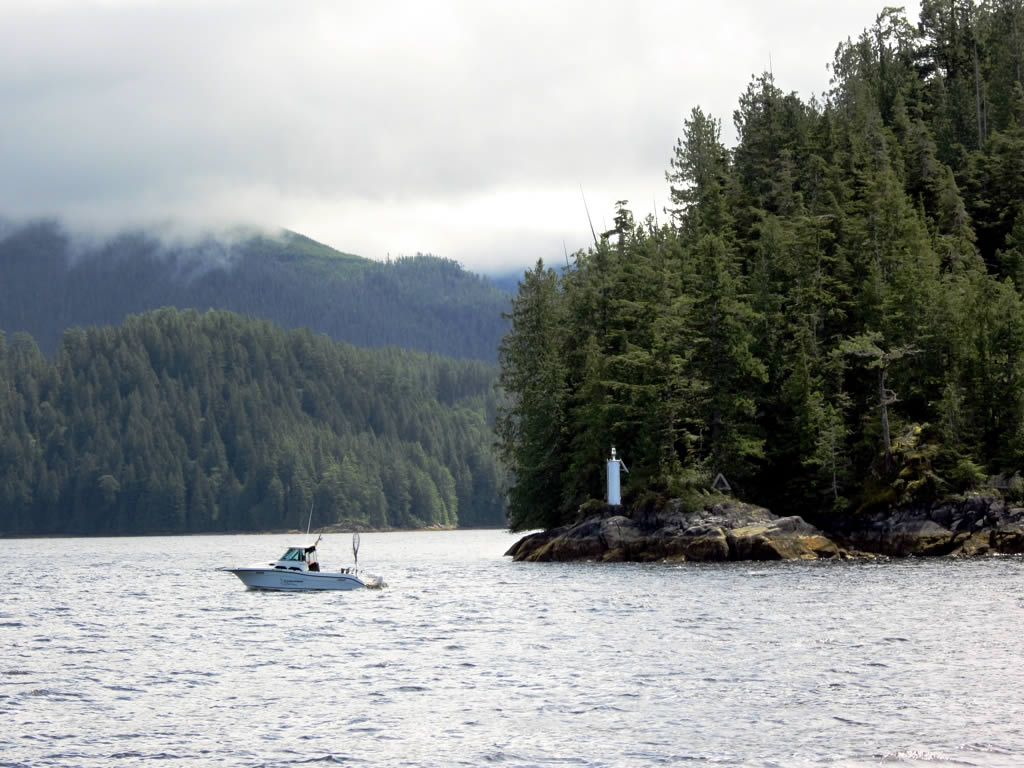
- Bligh Island on Muchalat Inlet, British Columbia

- Location within Vancouver Island Location within British Columbia
- Interactive map of Bligh Island Marine Provincial Park
- Location: Nootka Land District, British Columbia, Canada
- Nearest city: Yuquot, BC
- Coordinates: 49°37′59″N 126°32′35″W
- Area: 4,456 ha (11,010 acres)
- Established: July 13, 1995
- Governing body: BC Parks

Bligh Island Marine Provincial Park is a provincial park in British Columbia, Canada.

The park encompasses several islands in Nootka Sound, including Bligh Island, the Villaverde Islands, and the Pantoja Islands.

== See also ==
- William Bligh
