= Juan Perez Sound =

Sound in British Columbia, Canada

Coordinates: 52°30′00″N 131°25′00″W

Juan Perez Sound is a sound off the east coast of Moresby Island in the Queen Charlotte Islands of British Columbia, Canada. It is named for Juan José Pérez Hernández, usually known as Juan Pérez, who was among the first European explorers in the region.
