= Yuquot =

Friendly Cove
- Yuquot
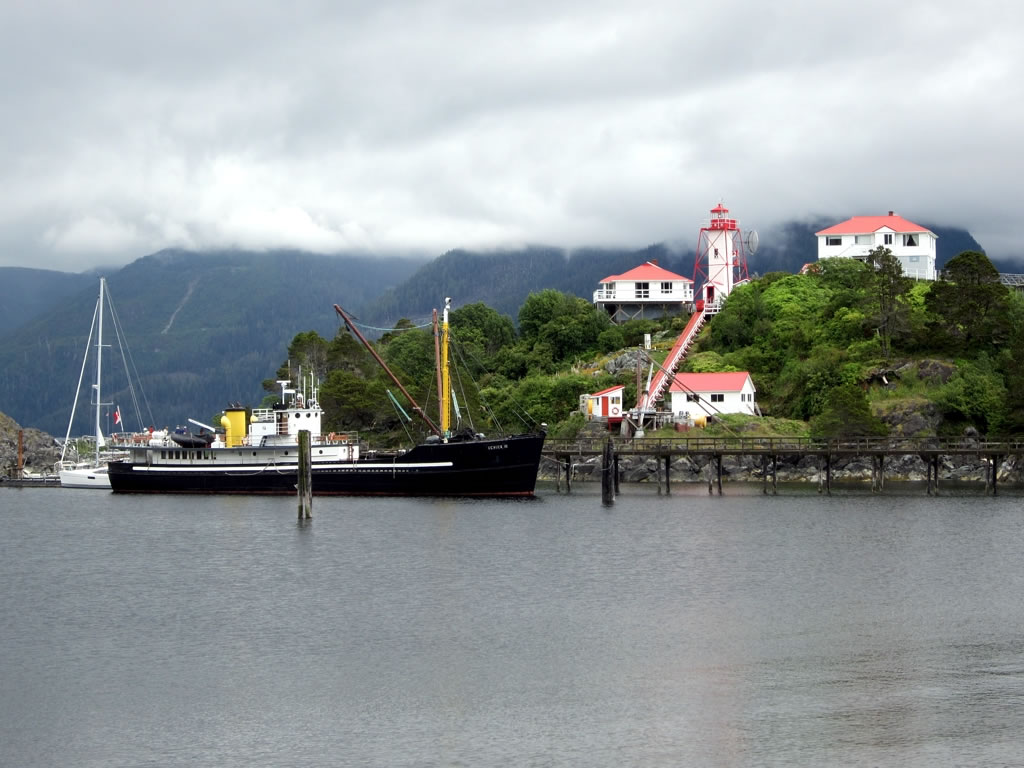
- Nootka Lighthouse overlooking Yuquot

- Location within Vancouver Island Location within British Columbia
- 49°36′N 126°37′W
- Location: Nootka Island, British Columbia, Canada

Site notes
- Governing body: Mowachaht/Muchalaht First Nations
- Website: www.yuquot.ca/

National Historic Site of Canada
- Official name: Yuquot National Historic Site of Canada
- Designated: May 25, 1923
- Reference no.: 54

Friendly Cove, also known as Yuquot (/ˈjuːkwɔːt/), is a small settlement of around six people—the Williams family of the Mowachaht band—plus two full-time lighthouse keepers, located on Nootka Island in Nootka Sound, just west of Vancouver Island, British Columbia, Canada. It was the summer home of Chief Maquinna and the Mowachaht/Muchalaht (Nuu-chah-nulth) people for generations, housing approximately 1,500 people in 20 traditional wooden longhouses. The name means "Wind comes from all directions" in Nuu-chah-nulth.

The community is located within the Strathcona Regional District but like all Indian Reserve communities is not governed by nor represented in the regional district. The Mowchaht/Muchalaht First Nations are rather part of the Nuu-chah-nulth Tribal Council, which unites the governments of the indigenous communities of the Island's West Coast.

The Canadian government declared Friendly Cove a National Historic Site in 1923, with recognition of the significance of the Spanish colonial settlement that was once there and First Nations history following in 1997.

== History ==
The meaning of the name Yuquot is “where the winds blow from many directions”. It has been dubbed "the birthplace of British Columbia".

=== Early exploration and settlement ===
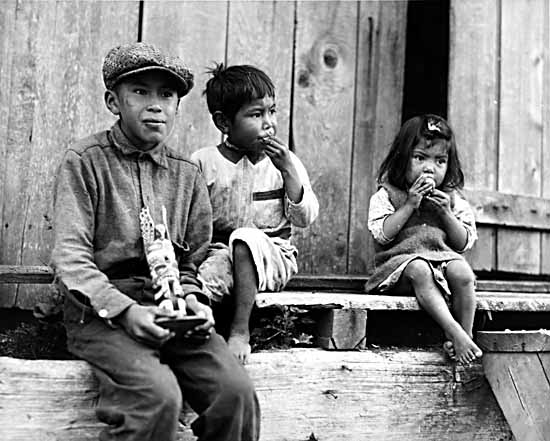
Three Nuu-chah-nulth children in Yuquot, 1930s

Yuquot had been occupied for over 4,300 years by First Nations peoples of the Nootka Sound region. In the late 18th century, Nootka Sound became an important site of early contact between First Nations of the Pacific Northwest and European explorers, and developed into a centre of maritime fur trade.

In 1774, Spanish explorer Juan José Pérez Hernández became the first European to spot Yuquot. The region was formally claimed as part of the Spanish Empire in a subsequent voyage by Spanish-Basque explorer Bruno de Heceta in 1775.

In 1778, the English Captain James Cook arrived at the bay on HMS Resolution, on his expedition in search of the North-West Passage. This marked the first recorded landing by Europeans, and a period of sustained contact between the Mowachaht people and these foreigners ensued for a while.

On May 5, 1789, Spanish navigator and explorer Esteban José Martínez established the settlement of Santa Cruz de Nuca. It was the first European colony in what is now British Columbia, the only Spanish settlement in what is now Canada, and the northernmost verified Spanish settlement in the Americas. The colony was protected by the cannon of Fort San Miguel and was maintained until the resolution of the Nootka Crisis in 1795.

=== Nootka Crisis ===
Yuquot was the scene of the Nootka Crisis, which nearly led to war between Spain and Britain. Negotiations in Europe calmed the situation and led to the first Nootka Convention. Each nation sent a commissioner to Nootka Sound in order to carry out the terms of the Nootka Convention and related diplomatic issues. Arriving in 1792, George Vancouver was commissioner for Britain and Juan Francisco de la Bodega y Quadra for Spain. Quadra also served as the commandant of the Spanish settlement at Yuquot, hosting Vancouver and his crew. Quadra and Vancouver had to engage in diplomatic negotiations due to the Nootka Convention's vagueness and lack of detail over how it was to be implemented. In addition both commissioners had been given incomplete, differing, and confused instructions by their governments. They negotiated for months but in the end failed to reach an agreement. The matter was sent back to the British and Spanish governments.

The primary problem was a differing interpretation of the Nootka Convention. Vancouver's position, as instructed, was that the entire Spanish settlement was to be turned over to him. Quadra's position was that there was nothing left to turn over in accord with the Nootka Convention, but he made various offers, such as turning over a small cove in Nootka Sound, where John Meares had built the North West America in 1788, or turning over the entire settlement in exchange if Britain agreed to set the boundary between Spanish and British territory at the Strait of Juan de Fuca. Chief Maquinna played a role in the negotiations, identifying the cove where Meares had built his vessel, swearing that no land had ever been sold to the British and that the Spanish were the rightful occupants at Yuquot—and that only on the condition that the site be restored to his people as soon as possible. Unable to reach an agreement, Vancouver and Quadra left in late 1792 and the settlement at Yuquot remained under Spanish control until 1795, when the terms of the third Nootka Convention, calling for the "mutual abandonment" of Nootka, were carried out, after which the site was reoccupied by the Maquinna and the Mowachaht people.

=== 19th century ===
John R. Jewitt, an English blacksmith, was held there for three years 1803-1805 as Maquinna's slave, following the capture of the trading ship Boston and the murder of the captain and all but one other crew members. Jewitt's memoirs form an important record of Yuquot at that period.

The whole of Vancouver Island was declared part of the Colony of Vancouver Island in 1849. This was amalgamated into the Colony of British Columbia in 1858 and later into Canada in 1871.

=== 20th century ===
In 1911, the government of Canada erected the Nootka Lighthouse atop San Rafael Island, a small rocky island that overlooks Yuquot and forms part of its natural harbour. The original lighthouse was later replaced with the current lighthouse in 1958. It serves as a navigational aid to vessels transiting Nootka Sound.

=== 21st century ===
Recently, the lighthouse has been home to a seasonal Canadian Coast Guard Inshore Rescue Boat station with a crew of three (two deckhands and a coxswain) and an 8-metre (26 ft) fast rescue craft at their disposal.

== See also ==
- History of the west coast of North America
- The Indian Church (painting)
