= Nootka Convention =

1790–94 Spanish–British treaties on North American claims

Nootka Sound Conventions
- Date: Nootka Sound Convention: October 28, 1790; Nootka Claims Convention: February 12, 1793; Convention for the Mutual Abandonment of Nootka: January 11, 1794
- Location: Madrid, Spain
- Also known as: Nootka Sound Convention; Nootka Claims Convention; Convention for the Mutual Abandonment of Nootka
- Participants: Spain; Great Britain
- Outcome: Britain and Spain were guaranteed freedom of the seas

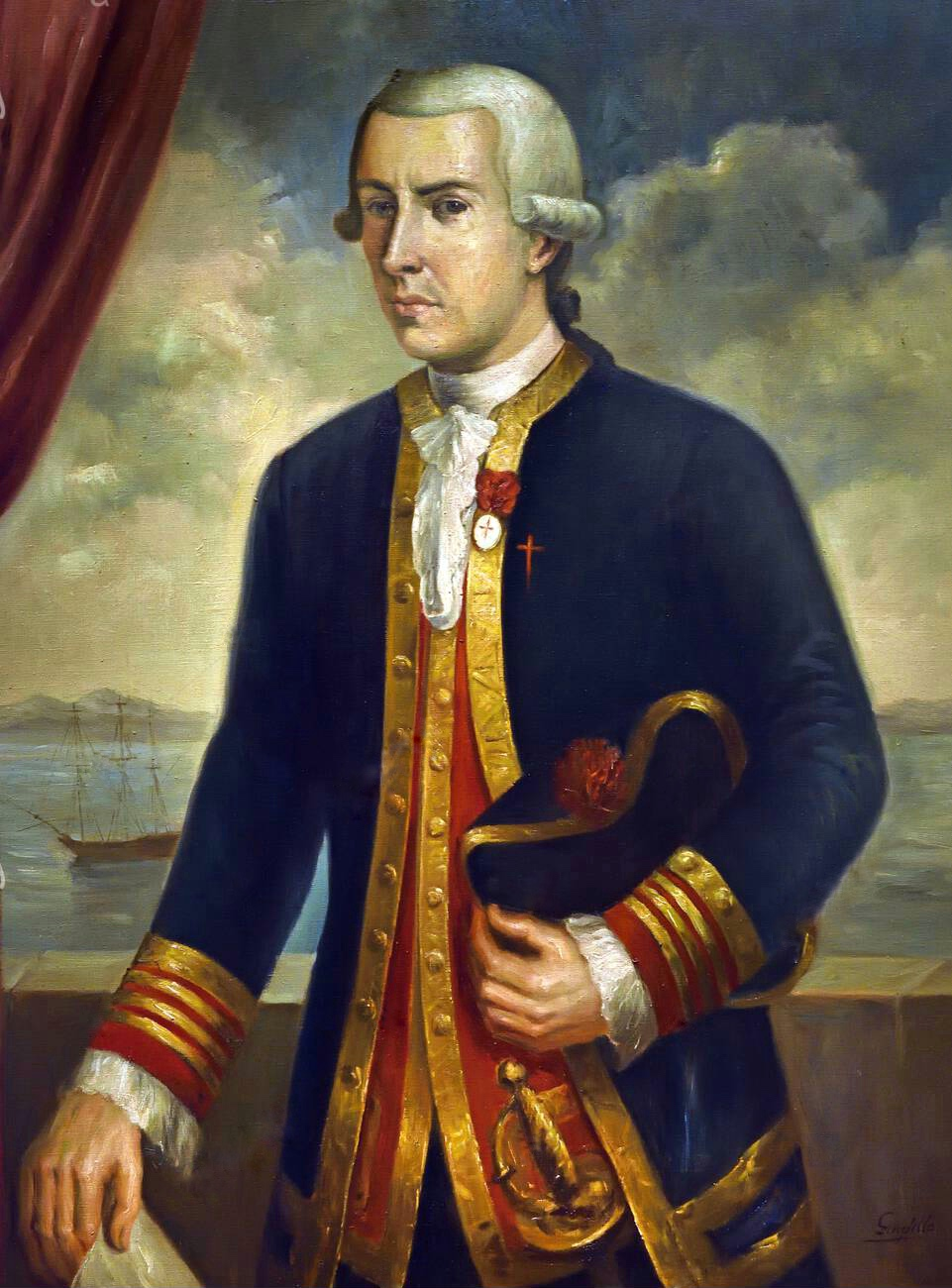
Bodega y Quadra was the Spanish representative in the 1792 commission that met to implement the Nootka Bay Agreement, along with British officer and explorer George Vancouver

The Nootka Sound Conventions were a series of three agreements between the Kingdom of Spain and the Kingdom of Great Britain, signed in the 1790s, which averted a war between the two countries over overlapping claims to portions of the Pacific Northwest coast of North America.

== Claims of Spain ==
The claims of Spain dated back nearly 300 years to the papal bull of 1493 that, along with the following Treaty of Tordesillas, defined and delineated a zone of Spanish rights exclusive of Portugal. In relation to other states the agreement was legally ineffective (res inter alios acta). Spain interpreted it in the widest possible sense, deducing that it gave them full sovereignty. Other European powers did not recognize the Inter caetera, and even Spain and Portugal only adhered to it when it was useful and convenient. Britain's claims to the region were dated back to the voyage of Sir Francis Drake in 1579, and also by right of prior discovery by Captain James Cook in 1778, although the Spanish had explored and claimed the region in 1774, under Juan Pérez, and in 1775, under Bruno de Heceta and Bodega y Quadra.

== Disputed sovereignty ==
The Nootka Sound dispute began in 1789 when Spain sent José Martínez to occupy Nootka Sound and establish exclusive Spanish sovereignty. During the summer of 1789 a number of fur trading vessels, British and American, arrived at Nootka. A conflict over sovereignty arose between the captain of the British Argonaut, James Colnett, and Martínez. By the end of the summer Martínez had arrested Colnett, seized several British ships, and arrested their crews. Colnett had come to Nootka Sound intending to build a permanent trading post and colony on land previously acquired by his business associate John Meares. At the end of the summer Martínez abandoned Nootka and took the captured ships and prisoners to San Blas, New Spain. The news about these events triggered a confrontation between Spain and Britain known as the Nootka Crisis, which nearly led to war.

== Nootka Conventions ==
The Nootka Conventions of the 1790s, carried out in part by George Vancouver and his Spanish counterpart Juan Francisco de la Bodega y Quadra, prevented the dispute from escalating to war. The first Convention was signed on October 28, 1790. and was purposefully vague. Its preamble contained the statement, "setting aside all retrospective discussions of the rights and pretensions of the two parties". Its first article said that all "the buildings and tracts of land" at Nootka Sound that had been seized by Martínez would be restored to Britain. For this purpose Vancouver and Bodega y Quadra were sent to Nootka Sound in 1792. However, no buildings had been seized and Bodega y Quadra said no land had been acquired by the British, as attested by the indigenous chief Maquinna as well as the American traders Robert Gray and Joseph Ingraham, who were present in 1789. Vancouver was unwilling to accept Bodega y Quadra's various counter-offers and the whole matter was sent back to the British and Spanish governments.

=== First Nootka Convention ===
The first Nootka Convention plays a role in the disputed sovereignty of the Falkland Islands between the United Kingdom and Argentina.

=== Second Nootka Convention ===
The second Nootka Convention, known as the Nootka Claims Convention, was signed in February 1793 and awarded compensation to John Meares for the Spanish seizure of his ships at Nootka in 1789.

=== Third Nootka Convention ===
The third Nootka Convention, also known as the Convention for the Mutual Abandonment of Nootka, was signed on January 11, 1794. It called for the mutual abandonment of Nootka Sound. Britain and Spain were both free to use Nootka Sound as a port and erect temporary structures, but, "neither ... shall form any permanent establishment in the said port or claim any right of sovereignty or territorial dominion there to the exclusion of the other. And Their said Majesties will mutually aid each other to maintain for their subjects free access to the port of Nootka against any other nation which may attempt to establish there any sovereignty or dominion".

== Unresolved borders ==
Although the Nootka Crisis originally revolved around the issue of sovereignty and the northern limits of New Spain, the basic issues were left unresolved. Both sides took up positions regarding the border, with Britain desiring it set just north of San Francisco and Spain at the Strait of Juan de Fuca. After Vancouver rejected Bodega's proposal of the Strait of Juan de Fuca the border question was not again addressed and instead left unspecified. The third convention addressed the issue of sovereignty only for the port of Nootka Sound itself.

== U.S. claims ==
The fledgling United States had no claim in this area at the time of the first Nootka Convention. US claims in the region began with Robert Gray's Columbia River expedition. They were strengthened and enlarged by the Lewis and Clark Expedition and the establishment of Fort Astoria by the Pacific Fur Company. The Spanish claims to the Pacific Northwest were acquired by the United States by the Adams-Onís Treaty, signed in 1819. The United States government argued that it had acquired a right of exclusive sovereignty from Spain. This position led to a dispute with Britain known as the Oregon boundary dispute. This dispute was not resolved until the signing of the Oregon Treaty in 1846, which divided the disputed territory and established what later became the international boundary between Canada and the United States.

Although the Nootka Conventions theoretically opened the Pacific Northwest coast from northern California to Alaska to British settlement, the advent of the Napoleonic Wars distracted any efforts towards this (as recommended by Vancouver at the time) and the proposed colony in the region was to be abandoned, The Hudson's Bay Company, the remaining British presence in the region, was averse to settlement and any economic activity other than its own, such that settlement and resource development did not take place to any degree until the Fraser Canyon Gold Rush of 1858, which formalized British claims on the mainland still residual from the Nootka Conventions into the Colony of British Columbia.

== See also ==
- Fort San Miguel
- Santa Cruz de Nuca
