= Juan Francisco de la Bodega y Quadra =

Spanish Navy officer (1743–1794)

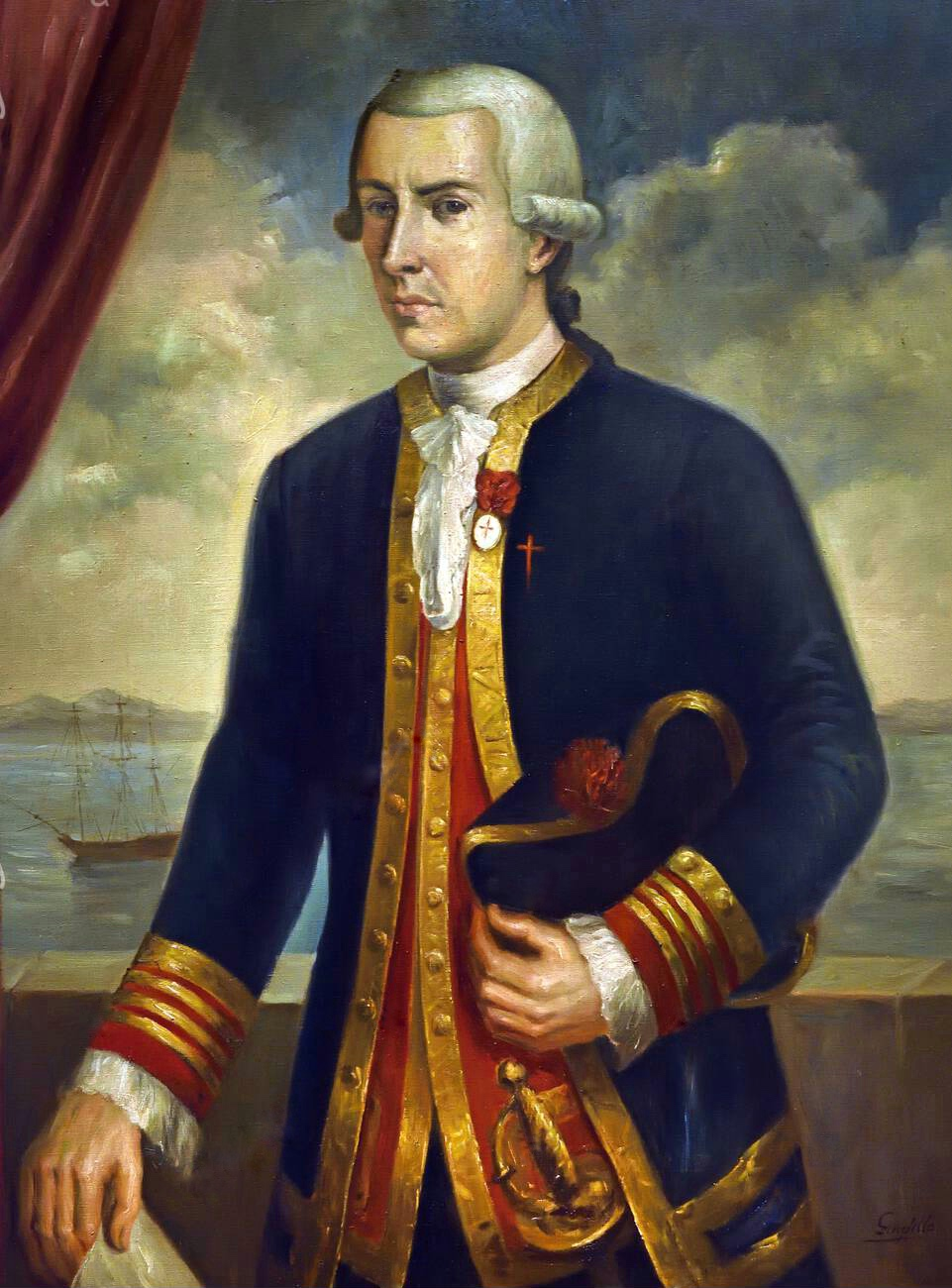
- Portrait, c. 1785
- Born: 22 May 1743; Lima, Viceroyalty of Peru
- Died: 26 March 1794 (aged 50) Mexico City, New Spain
- Allegiance: Spain
- Branch: Spanish Navy
- Service years: 1763–1793
- Rank: Frigate captain

Frigate Captain Juan Francisco de la Bodega y Quadra (22 May 1743 – 26 March 1794) was a Spanish Navy officer. Assigned to the Pacific coast Spanish Naval Department base at San Blas, in Viceroyalty of New Spain (present-day Mexico), he explored the Northwest Coast of North America as far north as present day Alaska. Bodega Bay in California is named for him. Bodega joined the Spanish Naval Academy in Cádiz at 19, and four years later, in 1767 was commissioned as an officer of the rank of frigate ensign (alférez de fragata). In 1773 he was promoted to ship-of-the-line ensign (alférez de navío), and in 1774 to ship-of-the-line lieutenant (teniente de navío).

== Parentage ==
Bodega y Quadra was born in Lima, Peru, to Tomás de la Bodega y de las Llanas of Biscay, Spain and Francisca de Mollinedo y Losada of Lima, Peru (her parents were from Bilbao in Spain). His family was of Basque origin. He studied at the National University of San Marcos in Lima.

== Pacific expeditions ==
=== 1775 expedition ===
In 1775 under the command of Lieutenant Bruno de Heceta, the Spanish explored the Pacific Northwest. This followed the first Spanish expedition by Juan Pérez in 1774, who had failed to reach and claim the upper northwest coast for Spain. The expedition consisted of two ships: the Santiago (alias Nueva Galicia), commanded by Hezeta himself, and the schooner Sonora (alias Felicidad, also known as Nuestra Señora de Guadalupe), commanded by his second in command, Lieutenant Juan Francisco de la Bodega y Quadra. Bodega y Quadra was given the lesser position of second officer on the Sonora despite the fact that he outranked the others. Bodega y Quadra had all the training and qualifications necessary to be considered for a senior officer position, but as a non-Spaniard he was subject to the class prejudice common to Spain and the colonial Americas during that time. So he was passed over for promotions.

The Spaniards were given orders to explore the coast and to go ashore so that the newly discovered territories would be recognized as Spanish lands. Most important for the expedition was the identification of colonial Russian settlements. The ships left San Blas, New Spain, on 16 March 1775. Illnesses (scurvy), storms, poor sailing capacities of the Sonora, and other incidents slowed their progress.

On 13 July 1775, they reached the vicinity of Point Grenville and Destruction Island in the present day U.S. state of Washington. While searching for a safe place for the ships to anchor, which was one of the duties of the Sonora, Bodega y Quadra sailed over what is now called Sonora Reef. He immediately realized his mistake and signaled the Santiago to not follow. The wind direction and changing tide trapped the Sonora between Sonora Reef and Point Grenville. The Santiago anchored a few miles to the south, in Grenville Bay. The Sonora attracted the attention of a nearby Quinault village. Many Quinault visited the schooner, trading with the crew and giving gifts of food. Early the next day an armed party from the Santiago went ashore and quickly conducted a possession ceremony, which was observed by some Quinaults. Later that morning, Bodega y Quadra decided to send six sailors ashore to collect water and wood. A large number of Quinaults appeared, attacked, and killed the shore party. Bodega y Quadra was unable to help as the party had taken the schooner's only boat. At noon he weighed anchor, hoping to escape the shoals at high tide. Progress was slow as the wind was low and the crew significantly reduced. Nine large canoes carrying about 30 Quinaults carrying bows and shields followed and came alongside the Sonora. They made signs of friendship which Bodega y Quadra rejected. The Quinaults in one of the canoes approached in an attempt to board the Sonora, but once the canoe was in range of the schooner's two swivel guns and three muskets it was fired upon, killing "the greater number of them", according to Bodega's journal.

Bodega wanted to avenge his lost sailors, but, was overruled by Heceta, who pointed out the expedition had orders to use force only in self-defense. Quinault ethnologists have come up with theories about the sudden attack, one being that the land-claiming ceremony was understood for what it was. Of particular note was the placement of a large cross on the beach. The Quinault would have understood that the erecting of a tall pole with a crossbar during an obviously religious ritual was a symbolically powerful act.

Shaken by this disaster, and with most of his crew suffering from scurvy, Hezeta decided to return to New Spain, but Bodega y Quadra refused to follow him without having completed the essential mission, which was to locate the Russians. He continued northward on the Sonora and got as far as what is now close to Sitka, Alaska, reaching 59° north latitude on August 15, 1775. Failing to find any Russians, he returned southward. When returning he made sure that he landed once to claim the coast for Spain. This expedition made it clear to the Spanish that the Russian colonization did not have a large presence in the Pacific Northwest. Bodega y Quadra was able to draw for the first time a reasonably accurate map of the west coast of North America.

=== 1779 expedition ===
On February 11, 1779, the corvettes Princesa and Favorita, under the command of Lieutenant Ignacio de Arteaga and his second in command, Lieutenant Bodega, left San Blas again. Their mission was to explore the northwest coast, and not to intervene with the assumed British navigators there. They charted every bay and inlet in search of the Northwest Passage, going north to 58°30′ before turning back from Alaska due to bad weather. They completed the complex process begun earlier of claiming the Pacific Northwest for Spain.

The expedition anchored in Port Etches, near Prince William Sound. The harbor was given the name "Puerto de Santiago" on July 23, 1779. The name commemorated Saint James, the patron saint of Spain, whose feast day falls on July 25. While the Spaniards were anchored in Port Etches they performed a formal possession ceremony. All the officers and chaplains went ashore in procession, raised a large cross while cannons and muskets fired salutes. The Te Deum was sung, followed by a litany and prayers. After a sermon was preached a formal deed of possession was drawn up and signed by the officers and chaplains. The title to Puerto de Santiago was important for years afterward, as it formed the basis of Spain's claim to sovereignty in the North Pacific up to 61°17′N. In 1780, Bodega was promoted to frigate captain in recognition of his achievements during the 1779 voyage.

== Peru ==
In 1780 Bodega was ordered to sail to the Viceroyalty of Peru in order to acquire quicksilver (mercury), which was required by the Mexican silver mining industry. The supply of quicksilver had fallen sharply because the ships that would normally have delivered it had been diverted elsewhere due to the war with Britain. After many delays, Bodega sailed the old frigate Santiago from San Blas on 5 June 1781. The voyage was plagued by difficulties, such as continually contrary winds and bad weather. The Santiago took on so much water it needed to be careened, but there was no opportunity to do so until in Peru. Bodega finally reached Callao, Peru, on 18 July 1782, thirteen months after sailing from San Blas. He soon discovered that there was no surplus quicksilver to be had. The Viceroy of Peru, Agustín de Jáuregui, had heard of Bodega's mission before Bodega arrived and decided to expedite matters by sending all the quicksilver he could spare to Acapulco on the merchant ship San Pablo. Wishing not to return without any cargo, Bodega arranged to carry military supplies. The Santiago was careened and many rotten planks were replaced. Bodega sailed from Callao at the end of March 1783, carrying the cargo of military supplies and a number of passengers. The voyage north went smoothly, and Bodega anchored the Santiago at San Blas on 20 June 1783.

== Spain ==
Shortly after Bodega's return to San Blas he received orders to go to Havana, Cuba. There, in 1784, he requested and received permission to travel to Spain, which he did in 1785. He spent four mostly discouraging and frustrating years in Spain. However, there were at least two positive events. First, the king approved Bodega's promotion to capitán de navío (Ship Captain) on 15 November 1786, the highest naval rank below flag officer ranks. Second, he was knighted by the King of Spain as a full-fledged knight of the Order of Santiago—the most prestigious of Spain's four orders of chivalry. It was very difficult to earn a commission in the Order of Santiago. Bodega had begun the process in 1775. He was finally knighted by the king on 8 April 1788.

== Commandant of San Blas ==
At the end of his stay in Spain, Bodega was appointed commandant of the Naval Department of San Blas. Instructed to select six junior officers to serve under him at San Blas, Bodega y Quadra chose Manuel Quimper, Ramón Saavedra Guiráldez y Ordóñez, Francisco de Eliza, Salvador Fidalgo, Jacinto Caamaño, and Salvador Menéndez Valdés. Bodega and these six officers sailed to America on the same ship that was carrying the new Viceroy of New Spain, Conde de Revillagigedo. The viceroy and Bodega arrived to find themselves in the immediate aftermath of the Nootka Crisis. They had two pressing issues to deal with right away. First they had to arrange for the release of the British ships, officers, and sailors taken prisoner by Martínez in 1789. Second, they had to respond to the Royal Order of April 14, 1789, which required that the Spanish establishment at Nootka Sound be maintained. At first neither Revillagigedo nor Bodega knew that Martínez had abandoned Nootka Sound. The Royal Order thus meant that a new expedition be immediately organized for the purpose of reoccupying, permanently, Nootka Sound. The reoccupation expedition was organized very quickly.

The three ships, Concepción, San Carlos, and Princesa Real sailed from San Blas and arrived at Nootka Sound in early April 1790. Francisco de Eliza was appointed commandant. Quimper, Fidalgo, and other officers were part of the expedition. The First Company of the Free Company of Volunteers of Catalonia, under Pedro de Alberni, sailed with Eliza to garrison the Nootka establishment. The expedition had to be well supplied, not only with cannons and munitions but also with warm clothes, new equipment for the soldiers under Alberni, materials for constructing buildings and Fort San Miguel, thousands of sheets of copper for trading or giving to the indigenous peoples, and numerous other goods. That Bodega y Quadra was able to organize the complicated logistical issues, especially given San Blas's chronically undersupplied and underfunded status, such that the ships sailed within months of Bodega's arrival, was a remarkable achievement.

=== Nootka Sound Commandant ===
Quadra was called as an expert witness in the aftermath of the Nootka Crisis at Nootka Sound. In 1789, as the Commandant based at San Blas, he sent out several new expeditions of exploration. In 1791 he was appointed Spanish commissioner to negotiate and administer the implementation of the Nootka Conventions at Nootka Sound.

As commandant of the Spanish establishment at Nootka, Bodega made a point of hosting and entertaining every visitor, indigenous and European. He held feasts for the officers of every ship that arrived at Nootka Sound, including the French fur-trading ship La Flavie, the "Portuguese" ship Feliz Aventureira (actually a British ship masquerading as Portuguese), the American ships Columbia, under Robert Gray, and Hope, under Joseph Ingraham, Vancouver's ships HMS Discovery and Chatham, and a number of others. The journals of many people who visited Nootka Sound during the summer of 1792 record amazement at the grandeur of Bodega's dinners, especially at such a remote part of the world, at which over fifty people would be served many courses on Bodega's personal collection of about 300 pieces of silver dinner ware. Bodega also provided ship repair services to any vessel needing them. A number of ships, including the Chatham, were careened and repaired by Spanish workers.

=== Island of Quadra and Vancouver ===
In August 1792, Bodega welcomed British Captain George Vancouver. The two commanders swiftly established friendly relations, including joint explorations and the sharing of supplies and information. Vancouver provided the services of his surgeon, Archibald Menzies, to help Quadra with increasingly serious headaches. During their meetings Bodega y Quadra asked Vancouver to name "some port or Island after us both" (however, Bodega wrote in his journal that it was Vancouver who made the suggestion). Since Vancouver had determined that the land upon which Nootka stood was a great island, he proposed that they name it Quadra's and Vancouver's Island: "would name some port or island after us both in commemoration of our meeting and friendly intercourse that on that occasion had taken place (Vancouver had previously feted Quadra on his ship);....and conceiving no place more eligible than the place of our meeting, I have therefore named this land...The Island of Quadra and Vancouver." It was thus entered upon the explorer's charts, but this name was later shortened to Vancouver Island.

However, the two commanders were unable to reconcile the conflicts in the instructions from their respective governments. At issue was whether the Spanish were to hand over only the small plot of land actually built upon by the adventurer John Meares, or the entire West Coast, or something in between. It is scarcely contested that Meares had exaggerated the extent of his discoveries. However, Bodega y Quadra was handicapped by uncertainties as to how far his superiors' wished to maintain Spanish sovereignty in a part of the world that had limited strategic value. He improvised and by chance pressed for exactly the condition that both the king and viceroy later communicated to him. Vancouver was likewise handicapped by a lack of instructions. He stuck by a strictly literal interpretation of Article I of the Nootka Convention. Having reached an impasse, the two agreed to refer the points at issue back to their respective governments in Madrid and London; Quadra arranged passage for Vancouver's envoy, William Robert Broughton, through Mexico. Viceroy Revillagigedo chastised Bodega for allowing Broughton passage through New Spain. Eventually, Spain and Great Britain signed an agreement on January 11, 1794, in which they agreed to abandon the region (the third Nootka Convention).

== Death ==
After suffering from chronic headaches for several years, in April 1793 Bodega y Quadra requested a leave from his duties to restore his health. It was granted and he left San Blas for Guadalajara and Mexico City. He suffered a strong fluxo de sangre (blood loss or haemorrhage) in Guadalajara. He had a seizure in Mexico City and died there on March 26, 1794, at the age of 50. The internist Dr. John Naish has conjectured that Bodega y Quadra's death was the result of either a brain tumor or the severest form of hypertension. Given the lack of details and the imprecision contemporary diagnosis and description, Viceroy Revillagigedo's official statement that Bodega died "of natural causes" is indisputable. His body was interred at the Convent of San Fernando, of the order of San Francisco in Mexico City.

When George Vancouver, at Nootka Sound again in September 1794, learned of Bodega's death, he wrote in his journal (grammar and misspellings from the original):

"The death of our highly valuable and much esteemed friend Senr Quadra, who in the month of March had died at St. Blas, universally lamaneted. Having endeavoured, on a former occasion, to point out the degree of admiration and respect with which the conduct of Sen'r Quadra toward our little community had impressed us during his life, I cannot refrain, now that he is no more, from rendering that justice to his memory to which it is so amply intitled, by stating, that the unexpected melancholey event of his decease operated on the minds of us all, in a way more easily to be imagined than described: and whilst it excited our most grateful acknowledgements, it produced the deepest regret for the loss of a character so amiable, and so truly ornamental to civil society."

== Legacy ==
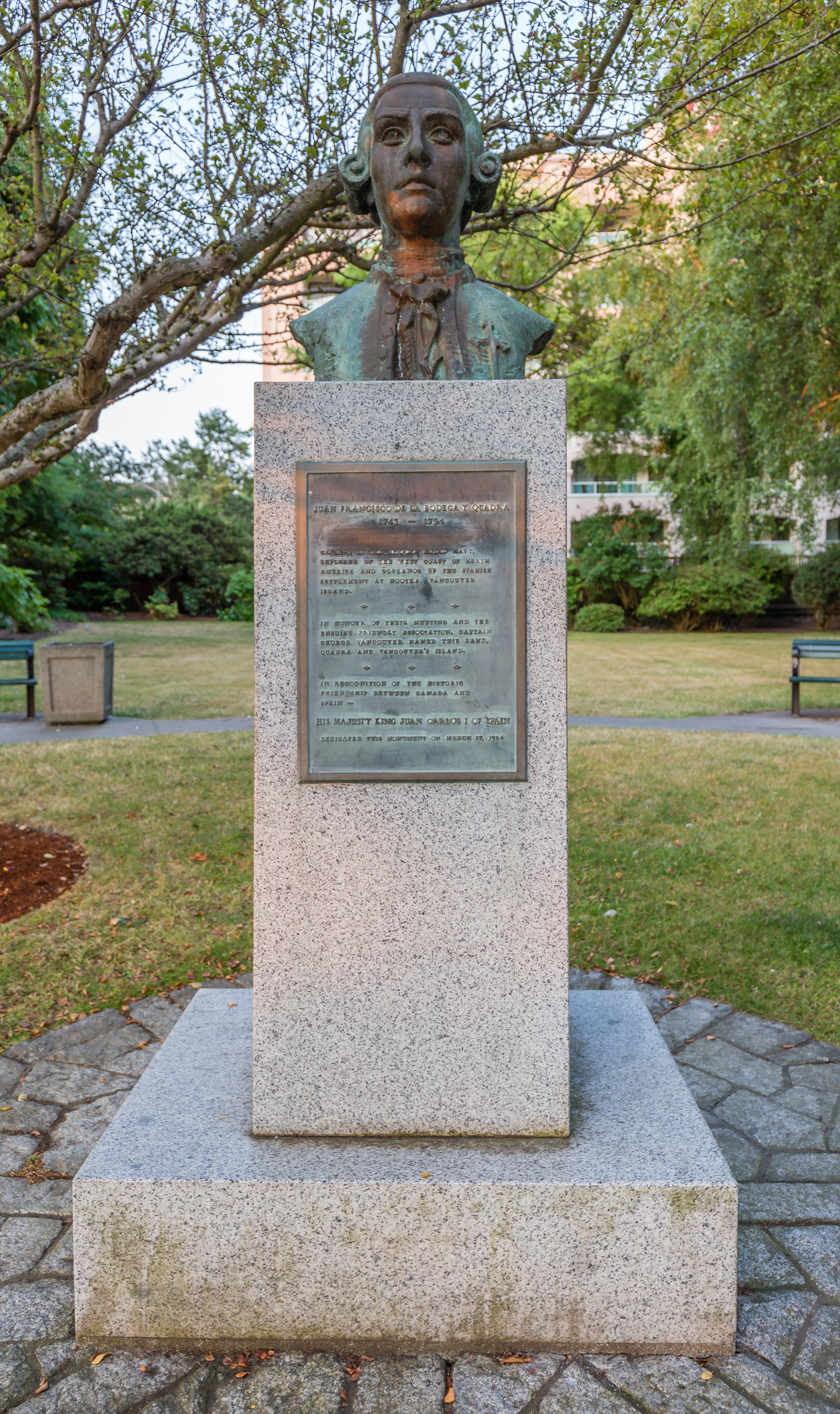
Bust of Juan Francisco de la Bodega y Quadra in Quadra Park, Victoria, British Columbia, Canada

Places named after him:

- Bodega Bay in northern California.
- Vancouver Island was frequently referred to as "Vancouver's and Quadra's Island" on many 19th century maps.
- Quadra Island, an island in British Columbia, Canada. Quadra Island was named after him in 1903
- Quadra Street, an arterial road in Victoria, British Columbia, and neighbouring Saanich.
- Boca de Bodega (Bodega Inlet) is the entrance around Wadleigh Island. It was named by Francisco Antonio Mourelle on May 24, 1779.
- HMCS Quadra, a Royal Canadian Sea Cadet Summer Training Centre in Comox, BC
- The federal electoral district of Vancouver Quadra on the West Side of the city of Vancouver, BC

Places he named:

- He named the Point that we know as Point Grenville, "Punta de los Martires" (Point of the Martyrs).
- Canoa Point (Canoe Point) was named by Bodega/Mourelle in 1775/79. It is a point of land on the northeastern shore of Prince of Wales Island jutting into Trocadero Bay at 133°1′25″ W.
- Discovered and named Bucareli Sound in Alaska. Named hundreds of places in the Bucareli Sound area.
- Unlucky Island (La Desgraciada), a name given by Bodega/Mourelle to an island located at 133°3′15″ W. *Unlucky Island (Trocadero Bay, Alaska): 55.400124167953486 N, -133.05525799594722 W
- Ladrones Islands were named Islas de Ladrones (Thieves) by Bodega/Mourelle in 1779. These five islands are located in Bucareli Bay, Alaska, at 55°23′ N and 133°5′ W.
- Cañas Island (Reeds) is an island in Trocadero Bay. Bodega/Mourelle named it Ysla de Cañas.
- Trinidad, California was named by him along with Bruno de Heceta on Trinity Sunday, June 11, 1775.

Other:

- The Quadra rose, developed by Agriculture and Agri-Food Canada, was named in his honour.

Spanish name variations used in the literature:

- Juan Francisco Bodega y Quadra
- Juan Francisco de Bodega y Quadra
- Juan Francisco de la Bodega y Quadra
- Juan Fran[cis]co de la Bodega y Quadra
- Juan Francisco de la Quadra
- Juan de la Bodega y Quadra

== See also ==
- Spanish expeditions to the Pacific Northwest

== Notes and references ==
=== General references ===
- Cook, Warren L. (1979). "Bodega y Quadra, Juan Francisco de la". In Halpenny, Francess G. (ed.). Dictionary of Canadian Biography. Vol. IV (1771–1800) (online ed.). University of Toronto Press.
- History of Southern Oregon: Pacific Coast -- by A. G. Walling 1884
- Vancouver Island History
- Canadian Military Heritage
- Spanish Exploration: Hezeta (Heceta) and Bodega y Quadra Expedition of 1775 to Formally Claim the Pacific Northwest for Spain
- BC Bookworld on Bodega y Quadra, with a bibliography.
- Tovell, Freeman M. (2008). At the Far Reaches of Empire: The Life of Juan Francisco De La Bodega Y Quadra. University of British Columbia Press. ISBN 978-0-7748-1367-9.

=== Further reading ===
- Derek Hayes (1999). Historical Atlas of the Pacific Northwest: Maps of Exploration and Discovery: British Columbia, Washington, Oregon, Alaska, Yukon. Sasquatch Books. ISBN 1-57061-215-3
- Michael E. Thurman (1967). The Naval Department of San Blas: New Spain's Bastion for Alta California and Nootka, 1769–1798. The Arthur H. Clark Company.
