= Nootka Island =

Island in Canada

Coordinates: 49°44′35″N 126°46′10″W

French map showing Nootka Island (Île Nootka) and Nootka Sound (Baie Nootka)

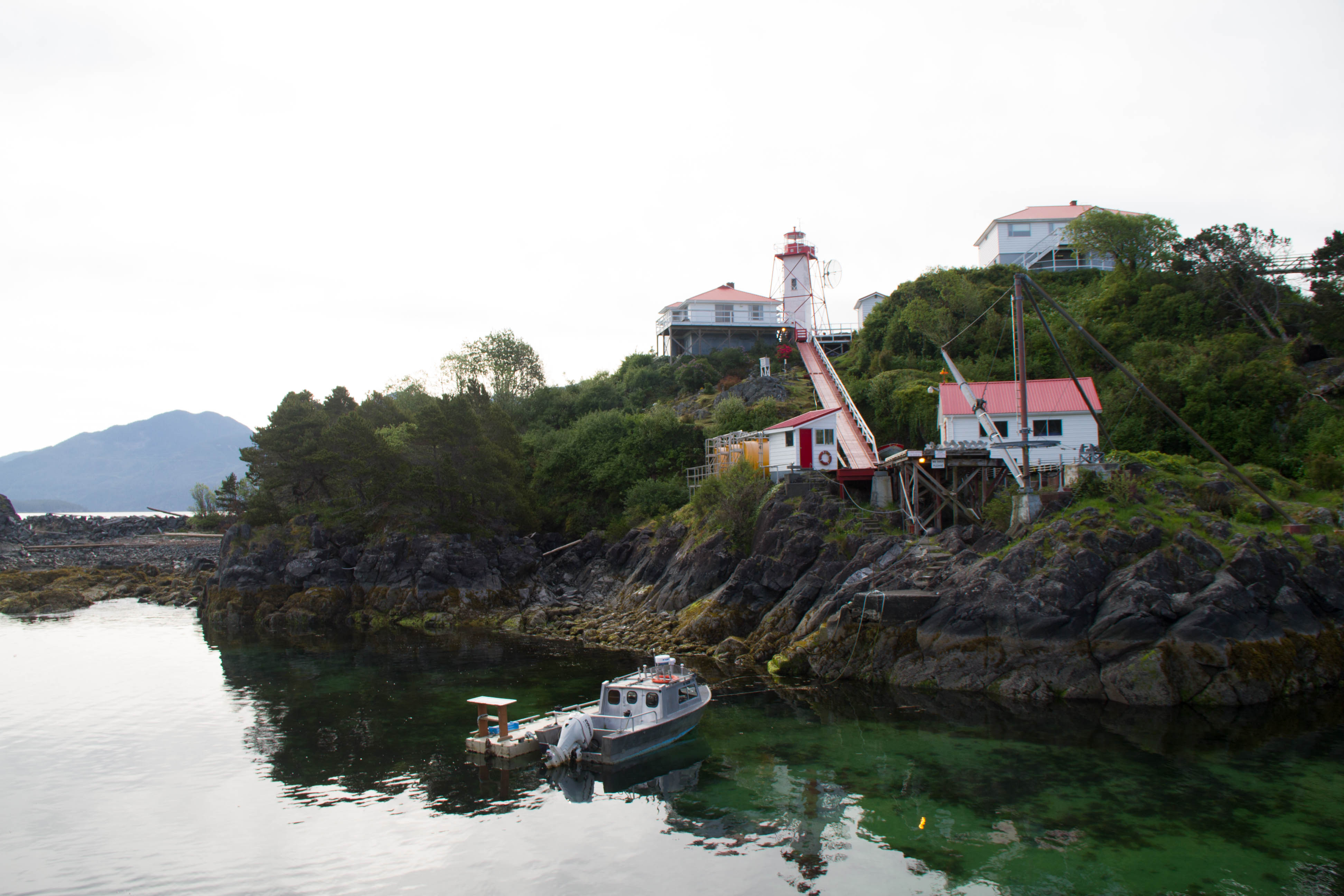
CCG IRB Station Nootka Lightstation on Nootka Island

Nootka Island (Spanish: isla de Nutca; French: île Nootka) is the largest island off the west coast of Vancouver Island in British Columbia, Canada. It is 510 square kilometres (200 mi^{2}) in area. It is separated from Vancouver Island by Nootka Sound and its side-inlets, and is located within Electoral Area A of the Strathcona Regional District.

Europeans named the island after a Nuu-chah-nulth language word meaning "go around, go around". They likely thought the natives were referring to the island itself. The Spanish and later English applied the word to the island and the sound, thinking they were naming both after the people.

In the 1980s, the First Nations peoples in the region created the collective autonym of Nuu-chah-nulth, a term that means "along the outside (of Vancouver Island)". An older term for this group of peoples was "Aht", which means "people" in their language and is a component in all the names of their subgroups, and of some locations (e.g. Yuquot, Mowachaht, Kyuquot, Opitsaht etc.).

== Climate ==
Climate data for Nootka (1981-2010)
Month	Jan	Feb	Mar	Apr	May	Jun	Jul	Aug	Sep	Oct	Nov	Dec	Year
Record high °C (°F)	18.5 (65.3)	16.5 (61.7)	18.5 (65.3)	23.0 (73.4)	27.5 (81.5)	30.0 (86.0)	34.0 (93.2)	34.0 (93.2)	26.5 (79.7)	22.5 (72.5)	22.5 (72.5)	18.0 (64.4)	34.0 (93.2)
Mean daily maximum °C (°F)	7.4 (45.3)	8.2 (46.8)	9.8 (49.6)	11.9 (53.4)	14.7 (58.5)	16.9 (62.4)	19.1 (66.4)	19.5 (67.1)	17.7 (63.9)	13.2 (55.8)	9.0 (48.2)	7.2 (45.0)	12.9 (55.2)
Daily mean °C (°F)	5.6 (42.1)	5.9 (42.6)	7.1 (44.8)	8.8 (47.8)	11.5 (52.7)	13.7 (56.7)	15.8 (60.4)	16.3 (61.3)	14.7 (58.5)	10.8 (51.4)	7.1 (44.8)	5.4 (41.7)	10.2 (50.4)
Mean daily minimum °C (°F)	3.7 (38.7)	3.5 (38.3)	4.3 (39.7)	5.7 (42.3)	8.3 (46.9)	10.6 (51.1)	12.4 (54.3)	13.0 (55.4)	11.6 (52.9)	8.4 (47.1)	5.1 (41.2)	3.5 (38.3)	7.5 (45.5)
Record low °C (°F)	−6.5 (20.3)	−10.0 (14.0)	−3.0 (26.6)	0.0 (32.0)	1.0 (33.8)	5.0 (41.0)	6.0 (42.8)	9.0 (48.2)	5.0 (41.0)	−1.0 (30.2)	−7.0 (19.4)	−5.5 (22.1)	−10.0 (14.0)
Average precipitation mm (inches)	471.6 (18.57)	325.4 (12.81)	314.2 (12.37)	264.6 (10.42)	169.0 (6.65)	147.3 (5.80)	79.4 (3.13)	99.4 (3.91)	145.4 (5.72)	355.5 (14.00)	480.2 (18.91)	427.7 (16.84)	3,279.7 (129.12)
Source: Environment Canada

== See also ==
- Nootka Crisis
- Nootka Convention
- Nootka Fault, a local geologic fault.
- Fort San Miguel
