= Fort San Miguel =

1789–1795 Spanish fort in Vancouver Island, Canada

- Yuquot, Nootka Island, near Vancouver Island, British Columbia, Canada
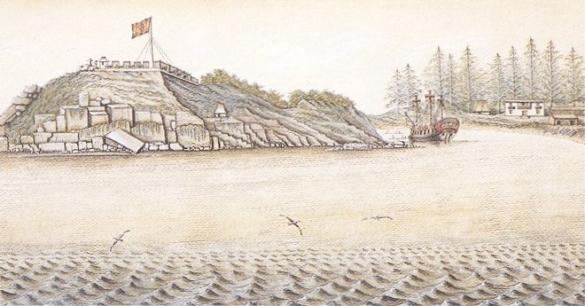
- Depiction of Fort San Miguel, 1793

Site information
- Type: fortification, colony
- Controlled by: Spanish

Location
- Coordinates: 49.59163°N 126.615458°W

Site history
- Built: 1789
- In use: 1789–1795

Garrison information
- Past commanders: Pedro de Alberní y Teixidor
- Garrison: Free Company of Volunteers of Catalonia, First Company

Fort San Miguel was a presidio, a Spanish fortification, at Yuquot (formerly Friendly Cove) on Nootka Island just west of north-central Vancouver Island. It protected the Spanish settlement called Santa Cruz de Nuca, the first colony in British Columbia.

== History ==
It was first built by Esteban José Martínez Fernández y Martínez de la Sierra in 1789 but dismantled in October of that year. It was then rebuilt and enlarged in 1790 then Nootka Sound was reoccupied by Francisco de Eliza. The fort was essentially a battery for coastal artillery for the defence of the harbour and buildings. The Spanish settlement, called Santa Cruz de Nuca, was the first colony in British Columbia.

The fort lay near the home of Maquinna, chief of a group of Nuu-chah-nulth whose descendants, the Muwachʼatḥ, are now in the joint Mowachaht/Muchalaht First Nations band government. The Muwachʼatḥ are now located at Gold River on Vancouver Island.

On May 15, 1789, Martínez chose the location of his fortification at the entrance of Friendly Cove on Hog Island. Work progressed so that on May 26 they were able to place their artillery followed by the construction of barracks and a powder storeroom. On June 24, 1789, a salvo was fired from the new fort and the Spanish ships in what Martínez considered an official act of possession of Nootka Harbour. On July 4, the American vessels and their captains Gray and Kendrick (who had arrived in the harbour 7 months earlier than Martínez) fired salvos and fireworks in recognition of their recent independence from Britain accompanied by a further salvo from the Spanish fort.

On July 29, 1789, new orders arrived from Manuel Antonio Flórez, viceroy of New Spain, directing Martínez to abandon the station and return to San Blas. The artillery from the fort was loaded back aboard the La Princesa and he left Friendly Cove on October 30, 1789. The fort was dismantled, but anticipating a reoccupation, Martínez buried crates of bricks and lime.

The fort was rebuilt one year later, in 1790, by Pedro de Alberní y Teixidor, a senior captain of the Spanish Army, who served the Spanish Crown in the Free Company of Volunteers of Catalonia along with 80 other men. They sailed to Nootka with the Francisco de Eliza expedition. After arriving at Nootka, Eliza established three lines of defence: the 300-ton frigate Concepción, the soldiers under Alberni on land and on the frigate, and the rebuilding of the battery on San Miguel Island. The construction of the battery was difficult. It was built on top of a rocky island: tall but small. Embrasures had to be built to support the guns. It then took four days to emplace eight large cannons. Later, six smaller cannons were also emplaced. The battery did not have enough space for the remaining eight large cannon Eliza had brought, so they were stored ashore.

The Spanish soldiers left the fort in 1792. In 1795 it was finally abandoned under the terms of the third Nootka Convention. Before being occupied by Spain the site had been the Mowachaht summer village of Yuquot. It was reoccupied by the ancestors of the Muwachʼatḥ under Maquinna. Remnants of the Spanish post, including its kitchen garden, were still visible when John R. Jewitt, an English captive of Maquinna, lived there in 1803–1805.

== See also ==
- History of British Columbia
- History of the west coast of North America
