= Nootka Sound =

Sound on the west coast of Vancouver Island in British Columbia, Canada

- French: Baie de Nootka
- Mowichat (Nuu-chah-nulth)
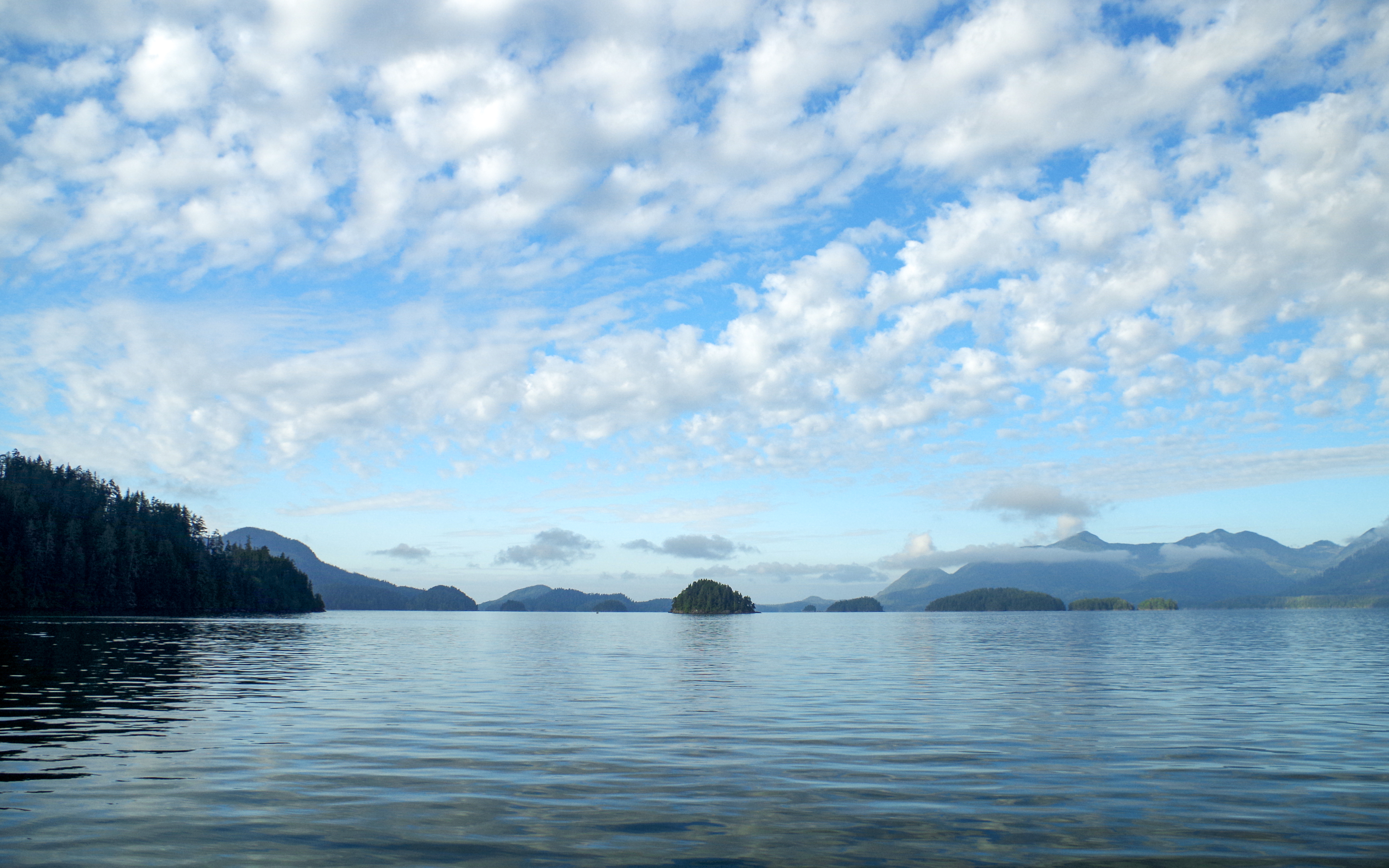
- Clouds over Nootka Sound

- Location in British Columbia Nootka Sound (Canada)

- Map of Nootka Sound
- Location: Vancouver Island, British Columbia
- Coordinates: 49°41′N 126°33′W
- Type: Sound
- Ocean/sea sources: Pacific Ocean
- Settlements: Gold River, Tahsis, Yuquot, Zeballos

Nootka Sound (French: Baie de Nootka) is a sound of the Pacific Ocean on the rugged west coast of Vancouver Island, in the Pacific Northwest, historically known as King George's Sound. It separates Vancouver Island and Nootka Island, part of the Canadian province of British Columbia. It played a historically important role in the maritime fur trade.

== History ==
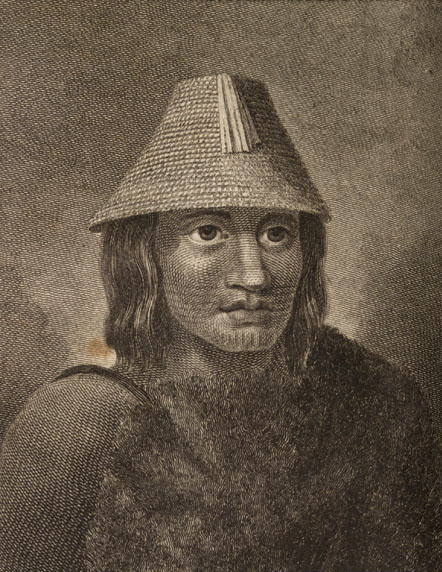
John Webber's A Native of King George's Sound, drawing published in a 1783 book about Captain James Cook

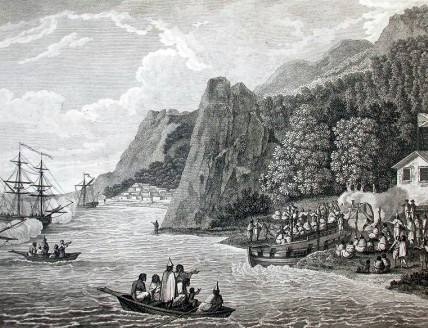
John Webber's The Launching of the North West America Ships of Meares at Nootka Sound in 1788

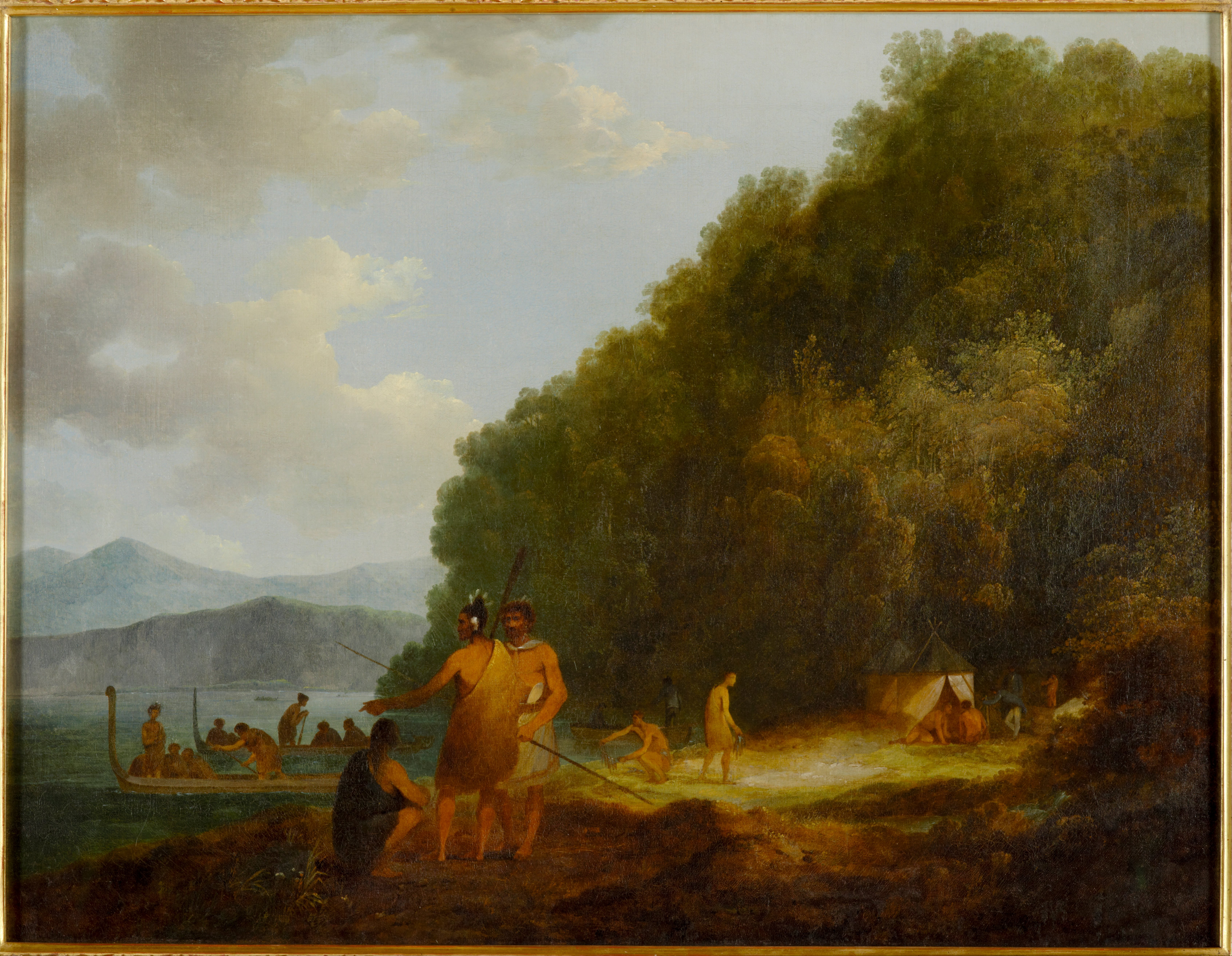
John Webber's Ship Cove, Queen Charlotte Sound, c. 1788

John R. Jewitt is an Englishman who describes the area in some detail in a memoir about his years as a captive of chief Maquinna from 1802 to 1805. The inlet had been inhabited by Nuu-chah-nulth people. They called it Mowichat.

=== European exploration and trade ===
On August 8, 1774, the Spanish Navy ship Santiago, under Juan Pérez, entered and anchored in the inlet. Although the Spanish did not land, natives paddled to the ship to trade furs for abalone shells from California. Pérez named the entrance to Nootka Sound Surgidero de San Lorenzo. The word surgidero means "source". When Esteban José Martinez arrived in 1789 he gave Nootka Sound the name Puerto de San Lorenzo de Nuca. To the Spanish establishment at Friendly Cove he gave the name Santa Cruz de Nuca.

In March 1778, Captain James Cook of the Royal Navy landed on Bligh Island and named the inlet "King George's Sound". He recorded that the native name was Nutka or Nootka, apparently misunderstanding his conversations at Friendly Cove/Yuquot; his informant may have been explaining that he was on an island (itchme nutka, a place you can "go around"). There may also have been confusion with Nuu-chah-nulth, the natives' autonym (name for themselves). It may also have simply been based on Cook’s mis-pronunciation of Yuquot, the native name of the place. The earlier Spanish and British names for the Sound swiftly went out of use.

At the time, the Spanish monopolized the trade between Asia and North America, and had granted limited licenses to the Portuguese. The Russians had established a growing fur trading system in Alaska. The Spanish began to challenge the Russians, with Pérez's voyage being the first of many to the Pacific Northwest. The British also became increasingly active in the region.

The next European to visit Nootka Sound after James Cook was the British trader James Hanna in August 1785. Hanna traded iron bars for furs. He sold the furs in China for a handsome profit, beginning an era of the Maritime Fur Trade.

In 1786 another maritime fur trader, James Strange, visited Nootka Sound. One of his crew, John Mackay, volunteered to remain at Nootka and work to establish relationships until Strange returned the next year. But Strange never returned. When the trader Charles Barkley arrived at Nootka in the summer of 1787, he was surprised to find John Mackay who, over the year, had learned the Nuu-chah-nulth's language and customs, adapted himself to their ways, and married a young native girl. At first Mackay was welcomed and befriended by Maquinna, but after unknowingly breaking a taboo he was exiled from Maquinna's house and forced to survive on his own. Barkley took Mackay on board his ship, Imperial Eagle.

=== Nootka Crisis ===
Starting in 1774 Spain sent several expeditions to Alaska to assert its long-held claim over the Pacific Northwest which dated back to the 16th century. During the decade 1785–1795 British merchants, encouraged by Sir Joseph Banks and supported by their government, made a sustained attempt to develop British fur trade in the area, despite Spain's claims and navigation rights. The endeavours of these merchants did not last long in the face of Spain's opposition. The challenge was also opposed by Japan holding obdurately to national seclusion. In 1789 Spain sent Sub-Lieutenant Esteban José Martinez, commanding Princesa and San Carlos, to enforce Spanish sovereignty and defend its claims. He arrived in February 1789 and established a settlement and built Fort San Miguel. The ship Iphigenia Nubiana, under Captain William Douglas and owned by John Meares, was impounded and the Spanish navy seized two other British ships, including Princess Royal. Two American ships in the area were allowed to sail as the United States was Spain's ally (Spain had helped the US in its War of Independence). However, the American ship Fair American, under Thomas Humphrey Metcalfe, was seized and taken to San Blas, before being released. The capture of the British ships led to the Nootka Crisis and near war between Britain and Spain. The British challenged Spanish claims to allegedly "un-colonized" land on the Pacific coasts of North and South America. The first Nootka Convention (1790) gave both countries the right to settle along the Pacific coasts, interrupting the Spanish monopoly for the first time in over two centuries. The British quickly sponsored the Vancouver Expedition of exploration. Difficulties in implementing the terms led to a second, and then a third Nootka Convention (1794).

The Nootka Sound controversy also played a part in the French Revolution. The Spanish Bourbon monarchy asked for French support in the dispute in the event that it led to war between Spain and Great Britain. The French Bourbon king Louis XVI wanted to back Spain against Great Britain, but his right to enter France into an alliance on his own prerogative was disputed by the National Assembly. The Assembly maintained that the King's right to determine foreign policy and declare war was subject to the sovereignty of the people. Eventually the Assembly ruled that a proposal for a declaration of war could be initiated by the king, but had to be ratified by the Assembly; this was a major blow to the monarchy.

=== Thomas Muir ===
The Scottish political reformer Thomas Muir had been banished to Port Jackson in Botany Bay in Australia for 14 years for the crime of sedition in 1793. He managed to escape having only spent 13 months there, on board the American merchant ship Otter. After a highly adventurous voyage across the as yet largely uncharted Pacific Ocean to Vancouver Island, Otter finally dropped anchor in Nootka Sound on 22 June 1796.

In conversation with José Tovar, the piloto (master) of Sutil, a Spanish vessel at anchor in the Nootka Sound, Muir learned to his dismay of the presence in neighbouring waters of HMS Providence, the British sloop-of-war under William Robert Broughton. This vessel had visited Port Jackson in Australia shortly before Muir’s escape and, since Muir had almost certainly become acquainted with the captain or members of the crew, his life was now in real danger.

To be captured while under sentence of transportation meant immediate execution. Once again Muir’s extraordinary luck held out. While a student at Glasgow, he had acquired a fluent command of Spanish and he was now able to persuade Tovar to break his regulations regarding the admission of foreigners into Spanish territory. Changing vessels he sailed with Tovar down the Pacific West Coast to the port of Monterey in Spanish Las Californias.

The chronicles of Pierre François Péron describe Muir's escape from Australia and the voyage across the Pacific to Nootka Sound, and then as far as Monterey, California.

Nootka Sound has not been the scene of any major international disagreements in modern history.

== Climate ==
The climate of the land around the bay is oceanic (Cfb), but with a wet fall, winter, and spring season and a strong dry-summer trend. Winters are chilly and summers are short and mild.

Climate data for Nootka Lightstation
Month	Jan	Feb	Mar	Apr	May	Jun	Jul	Aug	Sep	Oct	Nov	Dec	Year
Record high °C (°F)	18.5 (65.3)	16.5 (61.7)	18.5 (65.3)	23 (73)	27.5 (81.5)	30 (86)	32 (90)	30.5 (86.9)	26.5 (79.7)	22.5 (72.5)	22.5 (72.5)	18 (64)	32 (90)
Mean daily maximum °C (°F)	7 (45)	8 (46)	10 (50)	12 (54)	14.7 (58.5)	16.7 (62.1)	19.1 (66.4)	19.5 (67.1)	17.8 (64.0)	13.3 (55.9)	9.1 (48.4)	7 (45)	12.9 (55.2)
Mean daily minimum °C (°F)	3.3 (37.9)	3.5 (38.3)	4.2 (39.6)	5.6 (42.1)	8.2 (46.8)	10.4 (50.7)	12.3 (54.1)	12.9 (55.2)	11.6 (52.9)	8.4 (47.1)	5.1 (41.2)	3.3 (37.9)	7.4 (45.3)
Record low °C (°F)	−6.5 (20.3)	−10 (14)	−2.5 (27.5)	0 (32)	1 (34)	5 (41)	6 (43)	9 (48)	5 (41)	−1 (30)	−7 (19)	−5.5 (22.1)	−10 (14)
Average precipitation mm (inches)	438.1 (17.25)	363 (14.3)	299 (11.8)	264.1 (10.40)	164.6 (6.48)	159.2 (6.27)	78 (3.1)	91.7 (3.61)	152 (6.0)	348.4 (13.72)	459.3 (18.08)	456.3 (17.96)	3,273.6 (128.88)
Source: Environment Canada

== Luna the orca ==
In 2001, a two-year-old male orca, later named Luna, was seen alone in Nootka Sound as far inland as the marina at Gold River, British Columbia. Presumed to be an orphan separated from his pod, Luna became a local and international celebrity as a result of his playful and curious behaviour towards tug boats and recreational watercraft on Nootka Sound, and with people, including young children, on the Gold River dock. The popularity of Luna made Nootka Sound and Gold River an international attraction from early 2002 through March 2006 when Luna was killed in an accidental collision with the propeller of the Vancouver-based tugboat, General Jackson, on Mooyah Bay in Nootka Sound.

== In popular culture ==
It is mentioned in the former unofficial national anthem of English-speaking Canada, "The Maple Leaf Forever", to represent the western extent of Canada's "fair dominion".

Nootka Sound is referred to in the 2017 FX/BBC One drama Taboo and is a central part of the storyline. The Nootka trading post becomes an issue of contention between the United States, the British Crown, the East India Company and the protagonist James Keziah Delaney, who has inherited the trading post from his father.

== See also ==
- Bligh Island Marine Provincial Park
- History of the west coast of North America
- Nootka Convention
- Spanish expeditions to the Pacific Northwest
- Vancouver Expedition

== General and cited references ==
- Harboard, Heather (1996). Nootka Sound and the Surrounding Waters of Maquinna. Surrey, UK: Heritage House Publishing Company Limited. ISBN 1-895811-03-1.
- Jewitt, John Rodgers (1896). The adventures of John Jewitt: only survivor of the crew of the ship, Boston, during a captivity of nearly three years among the Indians of Nootka Sound in Vancouver Island. Clement Wilson. Available online through the Washington State Library's Classics in Washington History collection.
- Jones, Laurie. Nootka Sound Explored. Campbell River: Ptarmigan Press, 1991. ISBN 0-919537-24-3.
- King, Robert J. (1997). "'A regular and reciprocal System of Commerce' — Botany Bay, Nootka Sound, and the isles of Japan", The Great Circle (Journal of the Australian Association for Maritime History) vol. 19, no. 1. pp. 1–29.
- King, Robert J. (2008). "William Bolts and the Austrian Origins of the Lapérouse Expedition", Terrae Incognitae, vol. 40, pp. 1–28; presented at the Canadian Nautical Research Society Conference, Churchill, Manitoba, 2–7 August 2007.
- Manning, William Ray (1966) [1905]. The Nootka Sound Controversy. Part XVI of the Annual Report of the American Historical Association for the Year 1904, Washington: Government Printing Office. Reprint: Ann Arbor: University Microfilms Inc. pp. 279–478.
- Sánchez Joseph P. (April 1980). "Pedro de Alberni and the Spanish Claim to Nootka: The Catalonian Volunteers on the Northwest Coast". The Northwest Pacific Quarterly. 71:2. pp. 72-77. JSTOR 40490023.
