= British Columbia Highway 28 =

Highway on Vancouver Island in British Columbia

Highway 28
- Gold River Highway

Route information
- Maintained by the Ministry of Transportation and Infrastructure
- Length: 88 km (55 mi)
- Existed: 1970–present

Major junctions
- West end: Gold River
- East end: Highway 19 / Highway 19A in Campbell River

Location
- Country: Canada
- Province: British Columbia

Highway system
- British Columbia provincial highways
← Highway 27	→ Highway 29

Highway 28 is an east–west highway on the northern part of Vancouver Island, within the Strathcona Regional District. It is the main link to the northern part of Strathcona Provincial Park and the remote logging communities of Gold River and Tahsis, on the northwest coast of the Island. The highway first opened in 1970. Before the section of Highway 19 from Campbell River to Port Hardy was opened in 1979, Highway 28 acted as the main access to Port Hardy and various other communities on the northern tip of the Island (in the Regional District of Mount Waddington), aided by a system of local logging roads leading from the highway to the various north Island communities.

== History ==
Originally a logging road that connected to Highway 19, a few kilometres west of Campbell River, the road split, one alignment going south into Strathcona Park, and the other going west to Gold River, which looped north of Upper Campbell Lake. By 1970 a paved Highway was built over most of the logging road. Abandoning the west logging road, the new highway continued south, reaching the south end of Upper Campbell Lake. A bridge was built over the river between Buttle Lake and Upper Campbell Lake and a stretch of highway was added to where the west logging road connected. The rest of the road that lead to Gold River was subsequently paved. The access to Port Hardy, however, was left unchanged until 1976 when Highway 19 was extended north.

== Route details ==
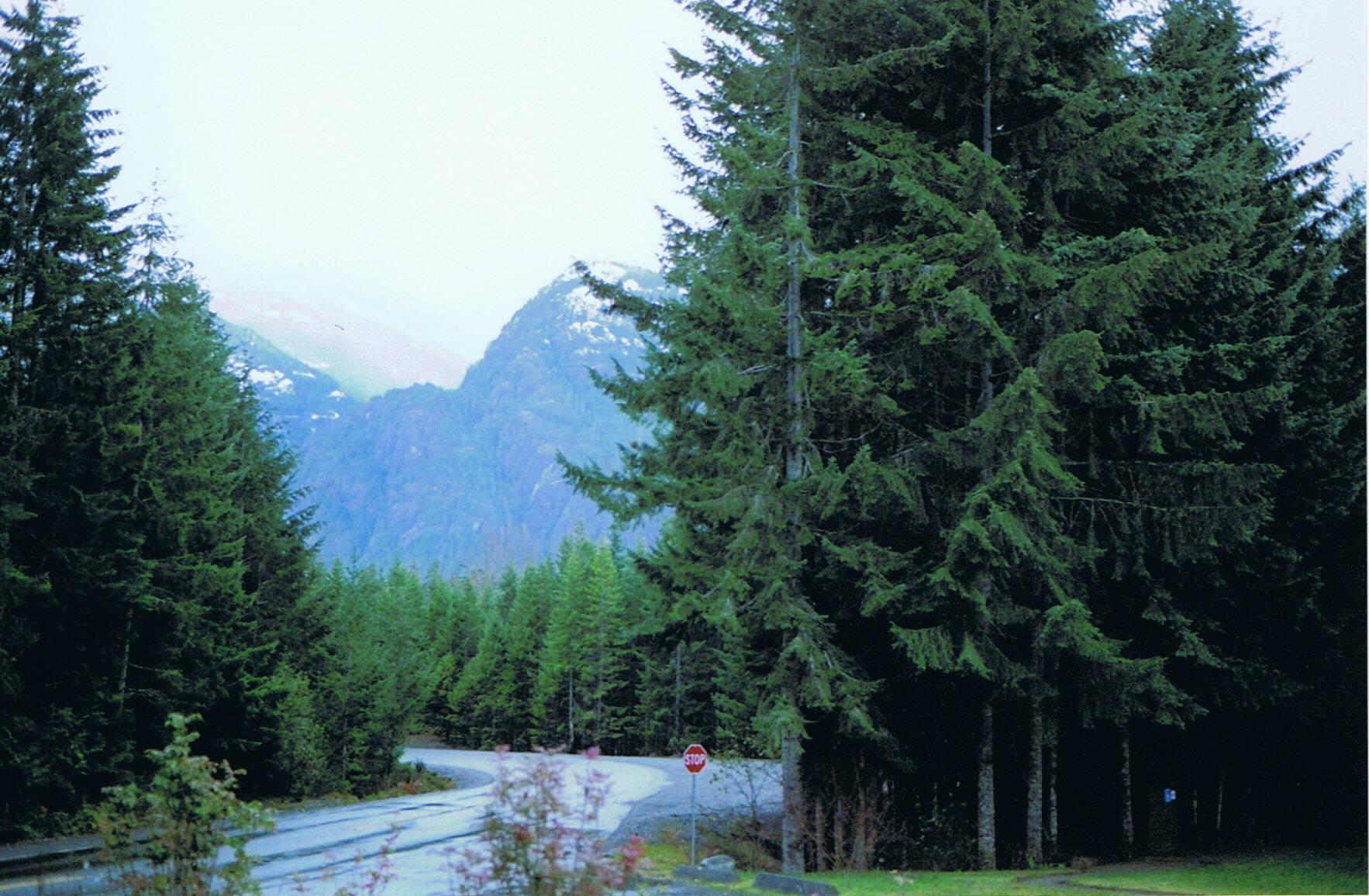
Highway 28 in Strathcona Park

Highway 28's total length is 99 km (62 mi). Starting in Gold River at the shore of Muchalat Inlet, Highway 28 follows the Gold and Heber Rivers northeast for 24 km (15 mi) before entering Strathcona Provincial Park. The highway winds its way east through the park, following the Elk River, for 17 km (11 mi), then hugs Upper Campbell Lake for another 11 km (6.8 mi) to its junction with the road to Westmin Mines. 37 km later (23 mi), the highway enters the city limits of Campbell River, finally terminating 10 km (6.2 mi) later at a junction with Highways 19 and 19A, in the northern part of the city.

== Major intersections ==
From east to west. The entire route is in Strathcona Regional District.

Location	km	mi	Destinations	Notes
Campbell River	0.00	0.00	Highway 19A south – City Centre, Quadra Island Highway 19 – Nanaimo, Port Hardy	Highway 28 eastern terminus; continues as Highway 19A
Gold River	87.01	54.07	Gold River Road / Scout Lake Road – Tahsis	
Gold River	88.06	54.72	Crosses the Gold River	
Gold River	88.06	54.72	Mill Road	Highway 28 western terminus; continues as Mill Road
1.000 mi = 1.609 km; 1.000 km = 0.621 mi
