= List of lakes named Timber Lake =

Timber Lake is a common name for lakes in the United States and may refer to:

Name	County	State	Geographic Coordinates	Elevation (feet)	Reference
Timber Lake	Yukon-Koyukuk	Alaska	65°50′47″N 156°26′38″W	164	U.S. Geological Survey Geographic Names Information System: List of lakes named Timber Lake
Timber Lake	North Slope Borough	Alaska	68°22′17″N 146°27′09″W	2717	U.S. Geological Survey Geographic Names Information System: List of lakes named Timber Lake
Timber Lake	Desha County	Arkansas	33°51′51″N 91°05′46″W	135	U.S. Geological Survey Geographic Names Information System: List of lakes named Timber Lake
Timber Lake	Siskiyou County	California	41°12′52″N 122°25′41″W	6030	U.S. Geological Survey Geographic Names Information System: List of lakes named Timber Lake
Timber Lake	Lake County	California	39°21′49″N 122°46′37″W	4872	U.S. Geological Survey Geographic Names Information System: List of lakes named Timber Lake
Timber Lake	Larimer County	Colorado	40°37′18″N 105°55′37″W	10919	U.S. Geological Survey Geographic Names Information System: List of lakes named Timber Lake
Timber Lake	Conejos County	Colorado	37°14′32″N 106°33′49″W	11322	U.S. Geological Survey Geographic Names Information System: List of lakes named Timber Lake
Timber Lake	Grand County	Colorado	40°22′26″N 105°47′47″W	11083	U.S. Geological Survey Geographic Names Information System: List of lakes named Timber Lake
Timber Lake	Fairfield County	Connecticut	41°32′12″N 73°30′43″W	899	U.S. Geological Survey Geographic Names Information System: List of lakes named Timber Lake
Timber Lake	Okaloosa County	Florida	30°29′09″N 86°36′40″W	26	U.S. Geological Survey Geographic Names Information System: List of lakes named Timber Lake
Timber Lake	Monroe County	Illinois	38°16′07″N 90°08′50″W	643	U.S. Geological Survey Geographic Names Information System: List of lakes named Timber Lake
Timber Lake	West Feliciana Parish	Louisiana	31°01′44″N 91°42′57″W	39	U.S. Geological Survey Geographic Names Information System: List of lakes named Timber Lake
Timber Lake	Crawford County	Michigan	44°49′12″N 84°35′52″W	1207	U.S. Geological Survey Geographic Names Information System: List of lakes named Timber Lake
Timber Lake	Kalkaska County	Michigan	44°49′43″N 84°59′29″W	1207	U.S. Geological Survey Geographic Names Information System: List of lakes named Timber Lake
Timber Lake	Iron County	Michigan	46°08′33″N 88°49′30″W	1663	U.S. Geological Survey Geographic Names Information System: List of lakes named Timber Lake
Timber Lake	Lenawee County	Michigan	42°04′18″N 84°10′56″W	951	U.S. Geological Survey Geographic Names Information System: List of lakes named Timber Lake
Timber Lake	Jackson County	Minnesota	43°49′04″N 95°12′52″W	1430	U.S. Geological Survey Geographic Names Information System: List of lakes named Timber Lake
Timber Lake	Cook County	Minnesota	47°45′14″N 90°59′48″W	1686	U.S. Geological Survey Geographic Names Information System: List of lakes named Timber Lake
Timber Lake	Audrain County	Missouri	39°07′29″N 91°51′07″W	755	U.S. Geological Survey Geographic Names Information System: List of lakes named Timber Lake
Timber Lake	Lincoln County	Montana	48°48′51″N 115°00′03″W	3012	U.S. Geological Survey Geographic Names Information System: List of lakes named Timber Lake
Timber Lake	Churchill County	Nevada	39°39′06″N 118°39′16″W	3884	U.S. Geological Survey Geographic Names Information System: List of lakes named Timber Lake
Timber Lake	Jefferson County	Oregon	44°47′58″N 121°48′02″W	5144	U.S. Geological Survey Geographic Names Information System: List of lakes named Timber Lake
Timber Lake	Clackamas County	Oregon	45°05′29″N 122°03′44″W	1489	U.S. Geological Survey Geographic Names Information System: List of lakes named Timber Lake
Timber Lake	Horry County	South Carolina	34°04′33″N 79°13′45″W	39	U.S. Geological Survey Geographic Names Information System: List of lakes named Timber Lake
Timber Lake	Dewey County	South Dakota	45°26′11″N 101°03′57″W	2146	U.S. Geological Survey Geographic Names Information System: List of lakes named Timber Lake
Timber Lake	Freestone County	Texas	31°52′24″N 96°02′33″W	246	U.S. Geological Survey Geographic Names Information System: List of lakes named Timber Lake
Timber Lake	Titus County	Texas	33°22′53″N 95°04′17″W	299	U.S. Geological Survey Geographic Names Information System: List of lakes named Timber Lake
Timber Lake	Briscoe County	Texas	34°41′08″N 100°59′28″W	2185	U.S. Geological Survey Geographic Names Information System: List of lakes named Timber Lake
Timber Lake	Mason County	Washington	47°13′40″N 122°58′29″W	174	U.S. Geological Survey Geographic Names Information System: List of lakes named Timber Lake
Timber Lake	Oneida County	Wisconsin	45°36′54″N 89°26′19″W	1555	U.S. Geological Survey Geographic Names Information System: List of lakes named Timber Lake
Timber Lake	Oneida County	Wisconsin	45°41′21″N 89°35′40″W	1572	U.S. Geological Survey Geographic Names Information System: List of lakes named Timber Lake

reservoirs

Name	County	State	Geographic Coordinates	Elevation (feet)	Reference
Timber Lake	Saline County	Arkansas	34°32′55″N 92°31′39″W	325	U.S. Geological Survey Geographic Names Information System: List of lakes named Timber Lake
Timber Lake	Fulton County	Arkansas	36°16′06″N 91°38′07″W	758	U.S. Geological Survey Geographic Names Information System: List of lakes named Timber Lake
Horse Creek Reservoir	Otero County	Colorado	38°09′23″N 103°23′57″W	4111	U.S. Geological Survey Geographic Names Information System: List of lakes named Timber Lake
Timber Lake	Fairfield County	Connecticut	41°32′06″N 73°30′40″W	899	U.S. Geological Survey Geographic Names Information System: List of lakes named Timber Lake
Timber Lake	Cobb County	Georgia	34°36′00″N 84°36′00″W	1237	U.S. Geological Survey Geographic Names Information System: List of lakes named Timber Lake
Timber Lake	Johnson County	Iowa	41°49′10″N 91°40′23″W	738	U.S. Geological Survey Geographic Names Information System: List of lakes named Timber Lake
Timber Lake	Lake County	Illinois	42°14′27″N 88°07′31″W	774	U.S. Geological Survey Geographic Names Information System: List of lakes named Timber Lake
Timber Lake	Carroll County	Illinois	42°03′08″N 89°56′27″W	764	U.S. Geological Survey Geographic Names Information System: List of lakes named Timber Lake
Timber Lake	Jackson County	Indiana	38°56′12″N 86°06′12″W	666	U.S. Geological Survey Geographic Names Information System: List of lakes named Timber Lake
Timber Lake	Huntington County	Indiana	40°55′44″N 85°24′55″W	797	U.S. Geological Survey Geographic Names Information System: List of lakes named Timber Lake
Timber Lake	Neosho County	Kansas	37°39′33″N 95°12′53″W	958	U.S. Geological Survey Geographic Names Information System: List of lakes named Timber Lake
Timber Lake	Linn County	Kansas	38°12′30″N 94°52′01″W	899	U.S. Geological Survey Geographic Names Information System: List of lakes named Timber Lake
Timber Lake	Caldwell County	Missouri	39°33′24″N 94°10′13″W	922	U.S. Geological Survey Geographic Names Information System: List of lakes named Timber Lake
Timber Lake	Burlington County	New Jersey	39°52′15″N 74°49′48″W	43	U.S. Geological Survey Geographic Names Information System: List of lakes named Timber Lake
Timber Lake	Rio Arriba County	New Mexico	36°34′16″N 106°58′03″W	7424	U.S. Geological Survey Geographic Names Information System: List of lakes named Timber Lake
Timber Lake	Cattaraugus County	New York	42°21′15″N 78°41′00″W	1860	U.S. Geological Survey Geographic Names Information System: List of lakes named Timber Lake
Timber Lake	Franklin County	Ohio	39°49′48″N 83°09′30″W	807	U.S. Geological Survey Geographic Names Information System: List of lakes named Timber Lake
Timber Lake	Washington County	Pennsylvania	40°08′18″N 80°22′40″W	1063	U.S. Geological Survey Geographic Names Information System: List of lakes named Timber Lake
Timber Lake	Lincoln County	Tennessee	35°08′12″N 86°33′06″W	696	U.S. Geological Survey Geographic Names Information System: List of lakes named Timber Lake
Timber Lake	Smith County	Texas	32°29′56″N 95°13′33″W	384	U.S. Geological Survey Geographic Names Information System: List of lakes named Timber Lake
Timber Lake	Liberty County	Texas	30°56′49″N 94°49′19″W	305	U.S. Geological Survey Geographic Names Information System: List of lakes named Timber Lake
Timber Lake	Liberty County	Texas	29°56′55″N 94°48′55″W	13	U.S. Geological Survey Geographic Names Information System: List of lakes named Timber Lake
Timber Lake	Campbell County	Virginia	37°18′48″N 79°16′24″W	814	U.S. Geological Survey Geographic Names Information System: List of lakes named Timber Lake
Timber Lake	Fairfax County	Virginia	38°54′15″N 77°20′31″W	341	U.S. Geological Survey Geographic Names Information System: List of lakes named Timber Lake
Big Twin Lake	Mason County	Washington	47°13′23″N 122°58′53″W	184	U.S. Geological Survey Geographic Names Information System: List of lakes named Timber Lake

== See also ==
- Timber Lake (disambiguation)
- Timberlake (disambiguation)
