= Campbell River, British Columbia =

Campbell River
- City
- City of Campbell River
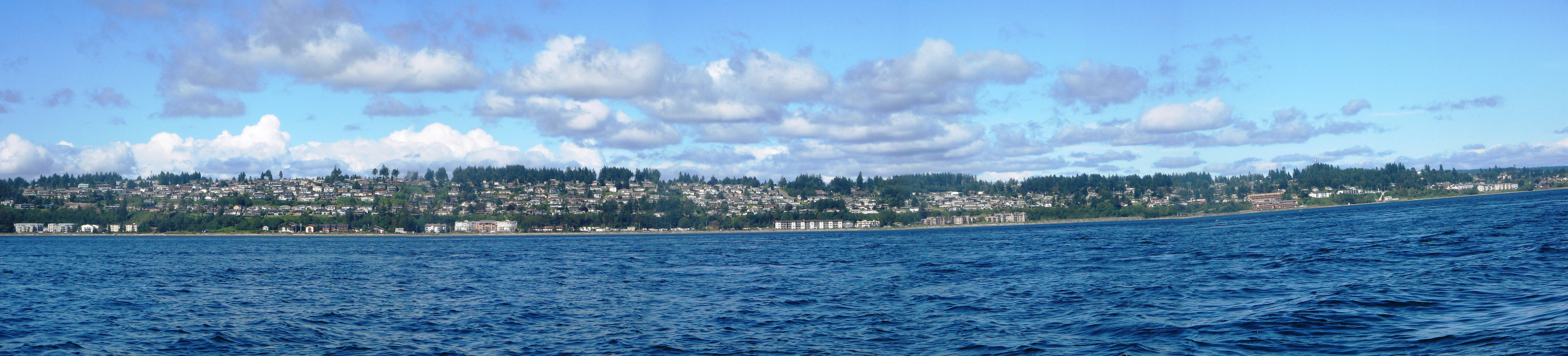
- Campbell River from Discovery Passage
- Nickname: Salmon Capital of the World.
- Location within British Columbia Location within Canada Location within North America
- Coordinates: 50°01′23″N 125°14′37″W
- Country: Canada
- Province: British Columbia
- Region: Mid-Island
- Regional District: Strathcona
- Founded: 1855
- Incorporated: 1947

Government
  - Type: Elected city council
  - Mayor: Kermit Dahl
  - MP: Aaron Gunn (Conservative)
  - MLA: Anna Kindy (Conservative)

Area (2021)
  - Land: 144.38 km^{2} (55.75 sq mi)
  - Population centre: 33.0 km^{2} (12.7 sq mi)
  - Census agglomeration: 1,734.05 km^{2} (669.52 sq mi)
- Elevation: 24 m (79 ft)

Population (2024)
  - Total: 37,117
  - Density: 246/km^{2} (640/sq mi)
  - Population centre: 38,108
  - Population centre density: 1,154.7/km^{2} (2,991/sq mi)
  - Census agglomeration: 40,704
  - Census agglomeration density: 23.5/km^{2} (61/sq mi)
- Time zone: UTC−07:00 (Pacific Time)
- Forward sortation area: V9H, V9W
- Area codes: 236, 250, 672, 778
- Highways: Highway 19; Highway 19A
- Waterways: Discovery Passage, Strait of Georgia
- Website: campbellriver.ca

Campbell River is a city in the Strathcona District of British Columbia, Canada, on the east coast of Vancouver Island at the south end of Discovery Passage, which lies along the 50th parallel north along the important Inside Passage shipping route. Campbell River has a population (2021 census) of 35,138 and has long been touted as the "salmon capital of the world." Campbell River and Region are near the communities of Quadra and the Discovery Islands, Sayward, Oyster River, Gold River, Tahsis and Zeballos.

Campbell River is served by the coast-spanning Island Highway, the nearby but now defunct Island Rail Corridor, and Campbell River Airport.

== History ==
The first inhabitants known in the area were members of the Kʼómoks (Island Comox) and related Coast Salish peoples. During the 18th century, a migration of Kwakwakaʼwakw (Kwakʼwala-speaking) people of the Wakashan linguistic and cultural group migrated south from the area of Fort Rupert. Establishing themselves in the Campbell River area, they enslaved and later absorbed the Kʼómoks. These newcomers became infamous as raiders of the Coast Salish peoples farther south, who are known to history as the Euclataws (also spelled Yucultas), a variant on the Laich-kwil-tach, Lekwiltok or Legwildok, which is their name for themselves. There are two subdivisions of this group, also known as the Southern Kwakiutl: the Wekayi or Weiwaikai of the We Wai Kai Nation (Cape Mudge Indian Band) on Quadra Island and the Weiwaikum of the Campbell River Band located in and around the city of Campbell River.

Captain George Vancouver reached Campbell River in 1792 aboard the ships HMS Discovery and HMS Chatham. The channel between Quadra Island and Campbell River is named Discovery Passage after HMS Discovery. The captain and his botanist, Mr Archibald Menzies, encountered a small tribe of 350 natives who spoke the Salish language. A Laich-kwil-tach war party, heavily armed with European rifles, paddled south from Johnstone Strait in the middle of the 19th century and were in control of the area when HMS Plumper came through on a cartography mission under Captain George Henry Richards around 1859. Dr Samuel Campbell was the ship surgeon, and historians believe his name was given to the river by Richards. The community took the name "Campbell River" when its post office was constructed in 1907. Likewise, the name of HMS Discovery's First Lieutenant Zachary Mudge is preserved in the nearby Cape Mudge.

Sport fishermen travelled to the area as early as the 1880s, especially after the tales from anglers such as Sir Richard Musgrave and Sir John Rogers. The formation of the Campbell River Tyee Club in 1924, over concern regarding over-fishing of the salmon stocks, served to popularize the area among fishermen. E.P. Painter, for instance, moved to Campbell River the following year and opened his Painter's Lodge in 1929. Painter's Lodge attracted clientèle from Hollywood and regular patrons included Bob Hope and Bing Crosby. Commercial fishing was a large industry for many years. The town's magistrate Roderick Haig-Brown purchased a fishing cabin on Campbell River and wrote a number of books on fly fishing for both sport fishermen and conservationists.

Industrial logging took off in the 1920s with Merrill Ring and Company, Bloedel, Stewart and Welch and Comox Logging. A large forest fire started near Buttle Lake and burned much of the valley in 1938. Rock Bay, Menzies Bay, and Englewood all were big logging camps.

After 1912, Campbell River became a supply point for northern Vancouver Island, Quadra Island, and Cortes Island. The E and N Railway was surveyed to Campbell River, yet it only reached Courtenay, 64 km (40 mi) south. In its original conception, it would have been the last leg of the transcontinental railway, which had been proposed to run down Bute Inlet after crossing the British Columbia Interior, connecting to Vancouver Island just north of Campbell River at Seymour Narrows. After the Second World War, Campbell River became a boomtown and industrial centre with the building of the John Hart Dam, the Elk Falls Mill, and nearby mills in Tahsis and Gold River. Logging and mining in the area prospered. There is a lead zinc mine nearby as well as coal mines, while a large copper mine operated to the north.

In recent years Campbell River, about halfway up Vancouver Island, has continued to mark the boundary between the more developed south and the wild and natural areas of the northern part of the island. Local fish hatcheries help to maintain salmon stocks for the fishing industry.

There is uncertainty about the source of the name of the city. It is thought that the river and the city may have been named for Dr. Samuel Campbell, who was assistant surgeon aboard HMS Plumper from 1857 to 1861.

== Climate ==
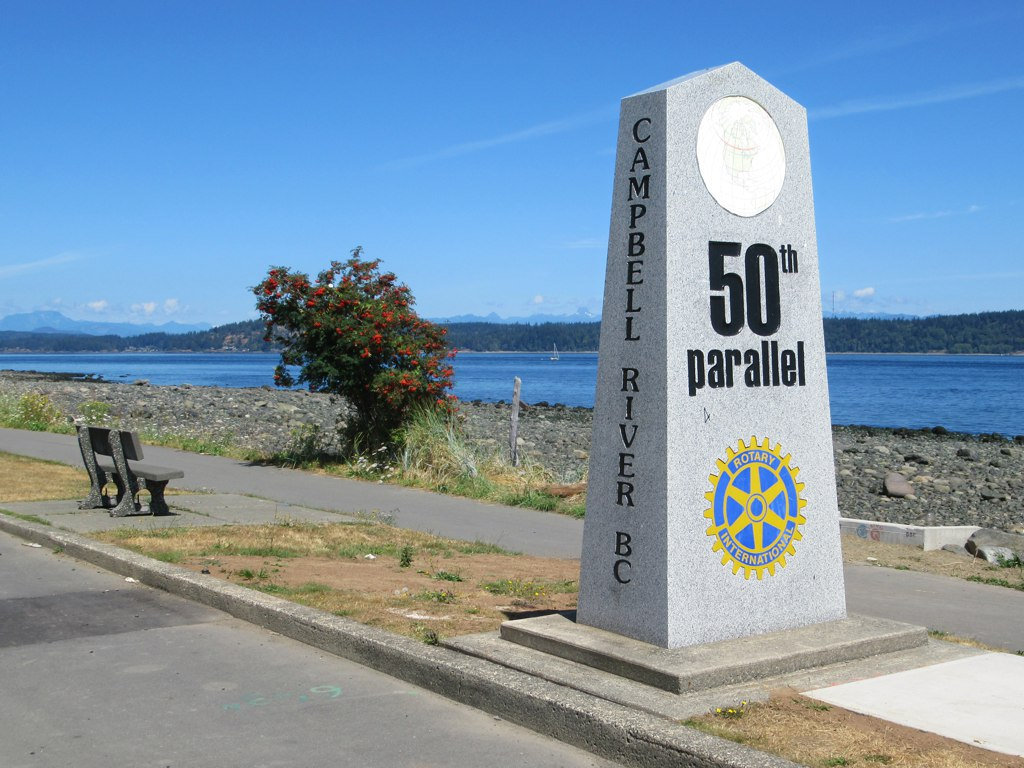
50th parallel marker next to the Old Island Highway in Campbell River, British Columbia, Canada

Campbell River has a Mediterranean climate (Köppen climate classification Csb), very closely bordering on oceanic (Cfb). The most precipitation is measured in November, at 231 mm (9.1 in) on average. January tends to see the most snow, 23.3 cm (9.2 in) on average. In the winter months, occasional Arctic bursts from the interior of British Columbia can make their way to the coast, bringing temperatures below freezing. If a Pacific low reaches the coast, a large snowfall can occur. Snowfalls in excess of 45 cm (18 in) have been recorded in a 24-hour period, and the greatest recorded snowfall was 53.3 centimetres (21.0 in) in 1978.

Vancouver Island's coldest temperature of −23.9 °C (−11.0 °F) was recorded in Campbell River on 30 January 1969.

The record high temperature was 39.6 °C (103.3 °F) recorded June 27, 2021. The record high daily minimum was 21.7 °C (71.1 °F) recorded June 17, 1969. The record highest dew point was 23.8 °C (74.8 °F) recorded June 28, 2021. The most humid month was July 1998 with an average dew point of 13.8 °C (56.8 °F), with no dew point below 8.0 °C (46.4 °F). The warmest month was July 1985 with an average mean temperature of 21.9 °C (71.4 °F), an average daily maximum of 27.8 °C (82.0 °F), and no daily maximum temperature below 22.4 °C (72.3 °F). July 2009 recorded the month with the highest average monthly daily minimum of 13.9 °C (57.0 °F). July 1998 also set a record with no temperature below 10.3 °C (50.5 °F) for the entire month.

The lowest yearly maximum dew point is 15.4 °C (59.7 °F) recorded in 2001. The lowest yearly maximum daily minimum temperature is 14.0 °C (57.2 °F) recorded in 1983. The lowest yearly maximum temperature is 29.6 °C (85.3 °F) recorded in 1999.

The average yearly maximum dew point is 17.7 °C (63.9 °F) and the average yearly maximum daily minimum temperature is 16.7 °C (62.1 °F).

Campbell River

Climate chart (precipitation, max. and min. temperature)
J	F	M	A	M	J	J	A	S	O	N	D
218 6 −1	139 7 −1	129 10 1	89 13 3	60 18 7	61 20 10	33 24 12	44 24 12	69 20 8	178 13 4	221 8 1	241 5 −1
- █ Average max. and min. temperatures in °C
- █ Precipitation totals in mm
- Source: Environment and Climate Change Canada
Imperial conversion
J	F	M	A	M	J	J	A	S	O	N	D
8.6 42 31	5.5 45 31	5.1 49 33	3.5 56 37	2.4 64 44	2.4 68 49	1.3 74 53	1.7 74 53	2.7 67 47	7 55 40	8.7 46 34	9.5 41 31
- █ Average max. and min. temperatures in °F
- █ Precipitation totals in inches

Climate data for Campbell River (Campbell River Airport) Climate ID: 1021261; coordinates 49°57′07″N 125°16′23″W; elevation: 108.8 m (357 ft); 1991–2020 normals
Month	Jan	Feb	Mar	Apr	May	Jun	Jul	Aug	Sep	Oct	Nov	Dec	Year
Record high humidex	13.9	16.1	21.6	28.0	32.4	43.5	40.9	40.0	35.5	27.7	17.9	15.7	43.5
Record high °C (°F)	16.1 (61.0)	17.5 (63.5)	21.5 (70.7)	28.5 (83.3)	33.2 (91.8)	39.6 (103.3)	37.2 (99.0)	37.8 (100.0)	33.5 (92.3)	26.3 (79.3)	17.8 (64.0)	15.1 (59.2)	39.6 (103.3)
Mean maximum °C (°F)	10.5 (50.9)	11.8 (53.2)	15.5 (59.9)	20.6 (69.1)	26.1 (79.0)	28.9 (84.0)	31.2 (88.2)	31.0 (87.8)	26.9 (80.4)	19.7 (67.5)	12.8 (55.0)	9.6 (49.3)	32.8 (91.0)
Mean daily maximum °C (°F)	5.6 (42.1)	7.0 (44.6)	9.6 (49.3)	13.1 (55.6)	17.7 (63.9)	20.0 (68.0)	23.5 (74.3)	23.6 (74.5)	19.6 (67.3)	13.0 (55.4)	7.9 (46.2)	5.1 (41.2)	13.8 (56.8)
Daily mean °C (°F)	2.6 (36.7)	3.2 (37.8)	5.2 (41.4)	8.0 (46.4)	12.2 (54.0)	14.9 (58.8)	17.7 (63.9)	17.6 (63.7)	14.0 (57.2)	8.7 (47.7)	4.6 (40.3)	2.3 (36.1)	9.2 (48.6)
Mean daily minimum °C (°F)	−0.5 (31.1)	−0.6 (30.9)	0.8 (33.4)	3.0 (37.4)	6.7 (44.1)	9.6 (49.3)	11.9 (53.4)	11.5 (52.7)	8.4 (47.1)	4.4 (39.9)	1.2 (34.2)	−0.5 (31.1)	4.7 (40.5)
Mean minimum °C (°F)	−9.1 (15.6)	−7.0 (19.4)	−5.1 (22.8)	−2.4 (27.7)	0.4 (32.7)	4.3 (39.7)	7.5 (45.5)	6.5 (43.7)	2.1 (35.8)	−2.8 (27.0)	−6.1 (21.0)	−8.1 (17.4)	−11.9 (10.6)
Record low °C (°F)	−23.9 (−11.0)	−17.8 (0.0)	−12.8 (9.0)	−5.6 (21.9)	−2.2 (28.0)	−0.6 (30.9)	2.2 (36.0)	1.7 (35.1)	−2.8 (27.0)	−9.7 (14.5)	−20.4 (−4.7)	−18.5 (−1.3)	−23.9 (−11.0)
Record low wind chill	−29.7	−23.4	−15.5	−7.6	−4.0	0.0	0.0	0.0	−4.9	−11.8	−26.1	−24.4	−29.7
Average precipitation mm (inches)	218.0 (8.58)	139.4 (5.49)	129.2 (5.09)	88.9 (3.50)	60.1 (2.37)	61.0 (2.40)	33.1 (1.30)	44.1 (1.74)	68.5 (2.70)	177.7 (7.00)	221.0 (8.70)	240.8 (9.48)	1,481.7 (58.33)
Average rainfall mm (inches)	194.1 (7.64)	120.9 (4.76)	115.3 (4.54)	88.4 (3.48)	60.1 (2.37)	61.0 (2.40)	33.1 (1.30)	44.1 (1.74)	68.5 (2.70)	177.7 (7.00)	213.1 (8.39)	217.1 (8.55)	1,393.3 (54.85)
Average snowfall cm (inches)	24.3 (9.6)	18.9 (7.4)	14.0 (5.5)	0.4 (0.2)	0.0 (0.0)	0.0 (0.0)	0.0 (0.0)	0.0 (0.0)	0.0 (0.0)	0.1 (0.0)	8.6 (3.4)	22.4 (8.8)	88.6 (34.9)
Average precipitation days (≥ 0.2 mm)	20.7	16.7	19.1	17.6	14.0	14.0	9.0	9.5	11.0	19.4	20.4	22.4	193.7
Average rainy days (≥ 0.2 mm)	18.4	15.0	18.0	17.6	14.0	14.0	9.0	9.4	11.0	19.3	19.9	20.6	186.3
Average snowy days (≥ 0.2 cm)	4.6	3.6	2.9	0.37	0.0	0.0	0.0	0.0	0.0	0.08	1.6	4.0	17.1
Average relative humidity (%) (at 1500 Local standard time)	83.9	74.4	67.1	59.6	54.9	56.7	53.5	53.9	60.6	73.5	82.3	86.3	67.2
Average dew point °C (°F)	1.0 (33.8)	0.8 (33.4)	1.8 (35.2)	3.5 (38.3)	6.5 (43.7)	9.3 (48.7)	11.4 (52.5)	11.7 (53.1)	9.9 (49.8)	6.5 (43.7)	3.1 (37.6)	0.9 (33.6)	5.5 (41.9)
Source 1: Environment and Climate Change Canada (October maximum)
Source 2: weatherstats.ca (for dewpoint and monthly&yearly average absolute maximum&minimum temperature)

== Demographics ==
In the 2021 Canadian census conducted by Statistics Canada, Campbell River had a population of 35,519 living in 15,557 of its 16,194 total private dwellings, a change of 7.6% from its 2016 population of 33,007. With a land area of 144.38 km^{2} (55.75 sq mi), it had a population density of 246.0/km^{2} (637.2/sq mi) in 2021.

=== Ethnicity ===
Panethnic groups in the City of Campbell River (1981−2021)
Panethnic group	2021		2016		2011		2006		2001		1996		1991		1986		1981	
Panethnic group	Pop.	%	Pop.	%	Pop.	%	Pop.	%	Pop.	%	Pop.	%	Pop.	%	Pop.	%	Pop.	%
European (Note: Statistic includes all persons that did not make up part of a visible minority or an indigenous identity.)	28,995	83.12%	26,680	83.48%	26,820	87.29%	25,730	87.61%	25,035	88.48%	26,065	90.72%	18,270	86.81%	15,040	89.21%	14,250	89.76%
Indigenous	3,870	11.09%	3,670	11.48%	2,670	8.69%	2,540	8.65%	1,560	5.51%	1,305	4.54%	1,870	8.89%	1,220	7.24%	970	6.11%
Southeast Asian (Note: Statistic includes total responses of "Filipino" and "Southeast Asian" under visible minority section on census.)	645	1.85%	635	1.99%	600	1.95%	475	1.62%	665	2.35%	395	1.37%	295	1.4%	40	0.24%	—N/a	—N/a
South Asian	535	1.53%	245	0.77%	120	0.39%	85	0.29%	500	1.77%	515	1.79%	280	1.33%	385	2.28%	475	2.99%
East Asian (Note: Statistic includes total responses of "Chinese", "Korean", and "Japanese" under visible minority section on census.)	445	1.28%	385	1.2%	210	0.68%	315	1.07%	360	1.27%	300	1.04%	185	0.88%	110	0.65%	165	1.04%
African	175	0.5%	125	0.39%	120	0.39%	45	0.15%	90	0.32%	90	0.31%	55	0.26%	10	0.06%	—N/a	—N/a
Latin American	120	0.34%	115	0.36%	95	0.31%	105	0.36%	30	0.11%	45	0.16%	65	0.31%	25	0.15%	15	0.09%
Middle Eastern (Note: Statistic includes total responses of "West Asian" and "Arab" under visible minority section on census.)	15	0.04%	45	0.14%	0	0%	10	0.03%	0	0%	0	0%	25	0.12%	30	0.18%	0	0%
Other/multiracial (Note: Statistic includes total responses of "Visible minority, n.i.e." and "Multiple visible minorities" under visible minority section on census.)	80	0.23%	55	0.17%	65	0.21%	45	0.15%	60	0.21%	0	0%	—N/a	—N/a	—N/a	—N/a	—N/a	—N/a
Total responses	34,885	98.22%	31,960	98.07%	30,725	98.52%	29,370	99.32%	28,295	99.43%	28,730	99.58%	21,045	99.39%	16,860	99.26%	15,875	100.27%
Total population	35,519	100%	32,588	100%	31,186	100%	29,572	100%	28,456	100%	28,851	100%	21,175	100%	16,986	100%	15,832	100%
Note: Totals greater than 100% due to multiple origin responses.

=== Religion ===
According to the 2021 census, religious groups in Campbell River included:

- Irreligion (22,235 persons or 63.7%)
- Christianity (11,585 persons or 33.2%)
- Sikhism (200 persons or 0.6%)
- Hinduism (175 persons or 0.5%)
- Buddhism (150 persons or 0.4%)
- Islam (65 persons or 0.2%)
- Judaism (50 persons or 0.1%)
- Indigenous Spirituality (35 persons or 0.1%)

== Economy ==
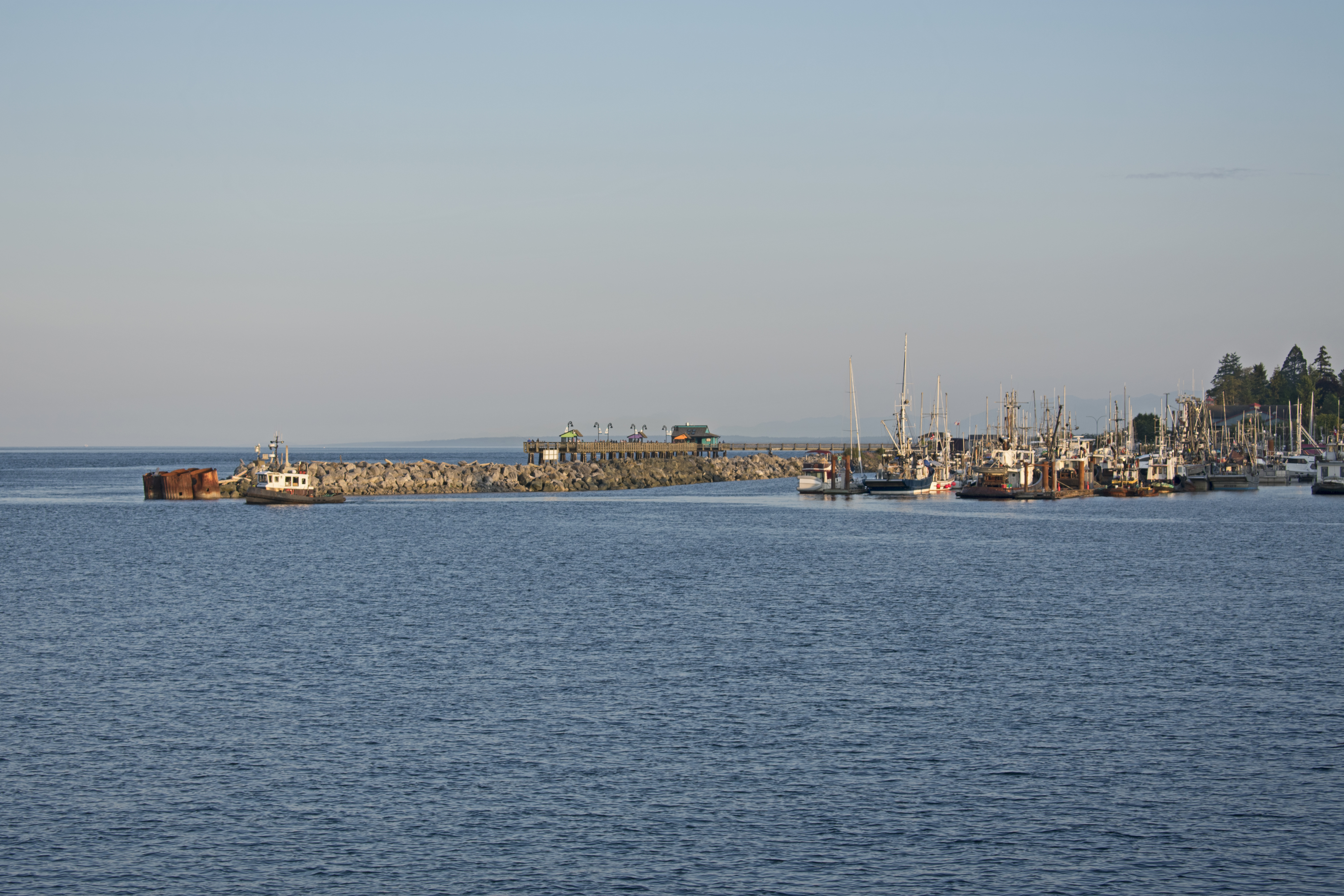
Marina and Fisherman's Wharf

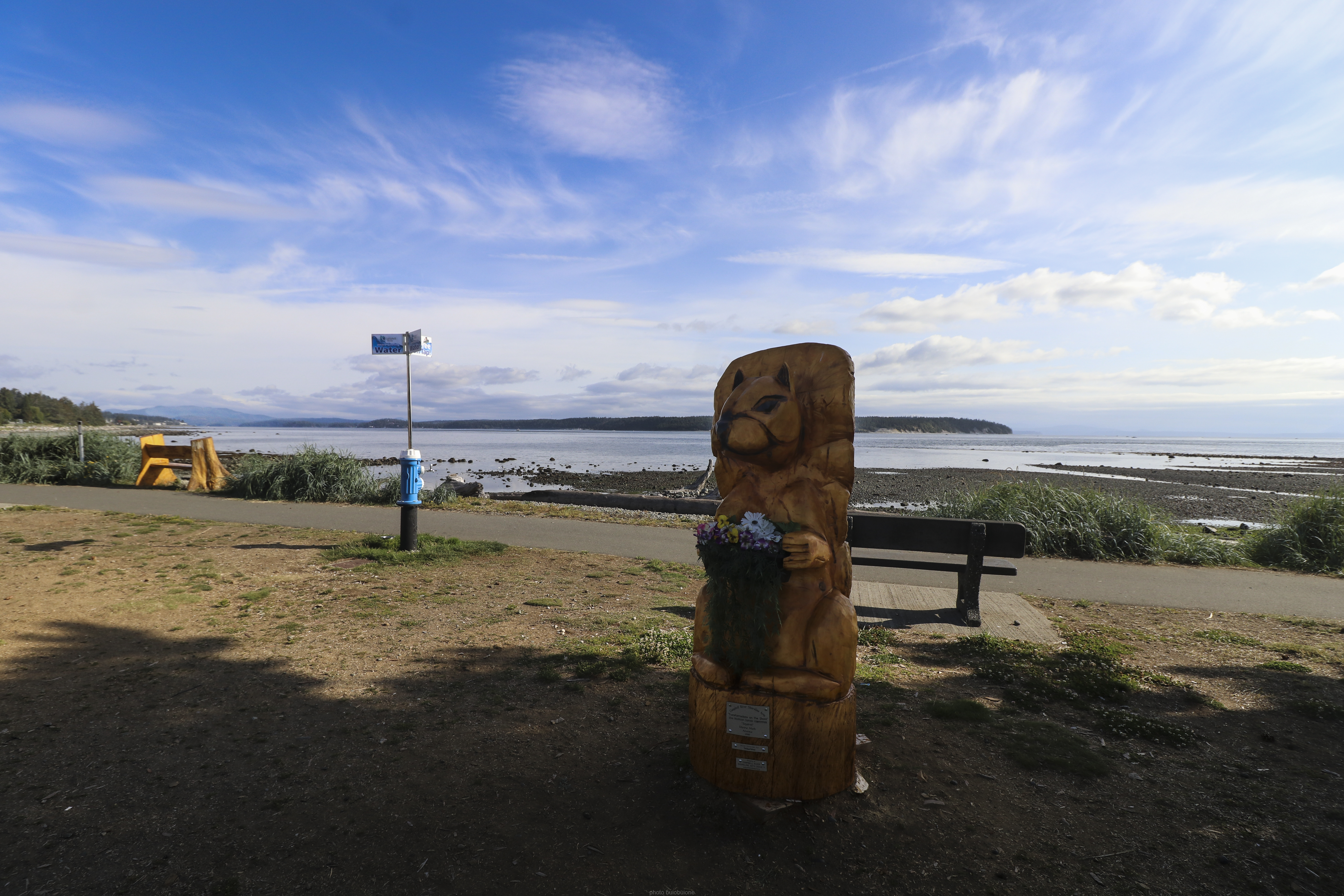
Campbell River Art installation, "Transformation on the shore"

Campbell River has a variety of growing industries and small businesses suitable to an ocean side community. As of 2012, the focus of business is directed towards aquaculture, agrifoods, clean energy development, construction, creative industries, forestry, fishing, health care, international education, mining, technology and tourism. Elk Falls Mill, one of the largest employers in the area shut down in 2009; however, logging continues to be a significant source of employment. There have been many cases of former mill employees moving away to other places with higher demands for a similar labour force, particularly Fort McMurray, Alberta.

== Education ==
Public schools are administered by School District 72 Campbell River and North Island College has a campus in Campbell River. Campbell River has recently developed a new international program accepting students from Germany, Austria, and various other countries across Europe, South America, and Asia. Along with School District 72, there is also a private K–12 Christian school, this being Campbell River Christian School. The two public high schools are Carihi Secondary School and Timberline Secondary School. Carihi Secondary School is also a part of School District 93 Conseil scolaire francophone.

The Conseil scolaire francophone de la Colombie-Britannique operates one Francophone school in Campbell River: the école Mer-et-montagne primary school.

== Politics ==
In the House of Commons of Canada, Campbell River is represented by the riding of North Island—Powell River with the incumbent member of Parliament for the riding being Aaron Gunn of the Conservative Party of Canada. In the Legislative Assembly of British Columbia, Campbell River is represented by the riding of North Island which has been represented by Anna Kindy of the Conservative Party of British Columbia since the 2024 British Columbia general election.

The mayor of Campbell River is Kermit Dahl. He was elected on 15 October 2022.

== Transportation ==
The city is served by Campbell River Airport (YBL), Campbell River Water Aerodrome at Campbell River Harbour, a BC Ferries route to Quadra Island, and an inland island highway and an ocean side island highway which connect the community to the rest of Vancouver Island. Campbell River Transit System provides bus service to the city and neighbouring communities. Operated by Watson and Ash Transportation, the transit system is funded under a partnership between the City of Campbell River and BC Transit, the provincial agency that plans and manages municipal transit systems.

== Movies filmed in Campbell River ==
- See (TV series)
- The 13th Warrior
- Final Destination 2
- Fisherman's Fall
- Going the Distance
- Seven Years in Tibet
- The Scarlet Letter
- Dawn of the Planet of the Apes
- Into the Forest

== Notable residents ==
- Sybil Andrews – artist
- Rod Brind'Amour – National Hockey League player (born in Ottawa but learned to play hockey in Campbell River) and current coach of the Carolina Hurricanes
- Dawn Coe-Jones – golfer, winner of three LPGA Tour tournaments
- Brett Connolly – National Hockey League player
- John Davison – cricketer (born in Campbell River but grew up in Australia)
- Krsy Fox – actress, filmmaker, and musician
- Kris Fredheim – retired professional hockey player
- Celia Haig-Brown – scholar and filmmaker
- Roderick Haig-Brown – judge, author, and conservationist
- Teal Harle – freestyle skier, placed fifth in slope style in the 2018 Winter Olympics
- Cameron Levins – long-distance runner, Olympian
- Barry Pepper – actor
- Jacqueline Pirie – (former) actress (born in Scotland, but had a drama school in Campbell River also known as Jacqueline Chadwick)
- Nicholas Thorburn – musician
- Avalon Wasteneys – rower, Olympic gold medallist

== Media ==
- Shaw Spotlight, formerly Shaw TV, community television (formerly Campbell River TV Association)
- Campbell River Mirror newspaper
- 88.7 FM – CHVI-FM, Christian radio
- 97.3 FM – CKLR-FM, hot adult contemporary
- 99.7 FM – CIQC-FM, adult contemporary music
- 100.7 FM – CKCC-FM, country music

== Sister City ==
Since 1983, Campbell River has been a sister or twinned city of Ishikari, Hokkaido, Japan. This twinning was based on the importance of salmon to both cities.
