= Timber Lake =

Timber Lake(s) may refer to:

== Populated places ==
- Timber Lake, South Dakota
- Timber Lakes, Utah

== Lakes ==
- Timber Lake in Desha County, Arkansas
- Timber Lake in Fulton County, Arkansas
- Timber Lake in Saline County, Arkansas
- Timber Lake (Lake County, California)
- Timber Lake (Jackson County, Minnesota)

== See also ==
- Timberlake (disambiguation)
- List of lakes named Timber Lake
- Timber Lake Playhouse, Illinois
