= L98 =

L98 may refer to:

- L98 Cadet Rifles
- Luna (Orca), an animal whose official name is L98
- A variant of the GM small-block engine used in Holden cars
