= The Scarlet Letter (1995 film) =

1995 film by Roland Joffé

- Theatrical release poster
- Directed by: Roland Joffé
- Screenplay by: Douglas Day Stewart
- Based on: The Scarlet Letter; 1850 novel by Nathaniel Hawthorne
- Produced by: Roland Joffé; Andrew G. Vajna
- Starring: Demi Moore; Gary Oldman; Robert Duvall; Robert Prosky; Edward Hardwicke; Joan Plowright
- Cinematography: Alex Thomson
- Edited by: Thom Noble
- Music by: John Barry
- Production companies: Hollywood Pictures; Cinergi Pictures; Lightmotive; Allied Stars; Moving Pictures
- Distributed by: Buena Vista Pictures Distribution (North America/South America); Cinergi Productions (International, through Summit Entertainment)
- Release date: October 13, 1995
- Running time: 135 minutes
- Country: United States
- Language: English
- Budget: $46 million
- Box office: $35 million

The Scarlet Letter is a 1995 American romantic historical drama film directed by Roland Joffé, based on the 1850 novel of the same name by Nathaniel Hawthorne. The film stars Demi Moore, Gary Oldman, and Robert Duvall, and was produced by Roland Joffé and Andrew G. Vajna.

The Scarlet Letter was released in the United States on October 13, 1995, by Buena Vista Pictures. Grossing $35 million on a $46 million budget, the film was considered a financial flop, and was panned by critics, who criticized the casting, writing, tonal inconsistencies and radical departures from the source material.

== Plot ==
In 1667, in the Massachusetts Bay Colony, tensions simmer between the local Puritan settlers and the neighboring Algonquian tribe. As Metacomet succeeds as the tribal chief during his father's funeral pyre, a new English colonist, Hester Prynne, arrives from overseas. While awaiting the return of her older husband, Roger Prynne, who is believed to be lost or dead following a mission to assist other settlers, Hester forms a romantic relationship with a young minister, Arthur Dimmesdale.

When news emerges suggesting Roger Prynne has likely died, Hester and Dimmesdale pursue their relationship, and Hester becomes pregnant. Upon discovery of her pregnancy, Hester is imprisoned for adultery. Although Dimmesdale initially resolves to confess his part in the affair, Hester persuades him to remain silent. She is publicly sentenced to wear a scarlet letter "A" for adultery and is shunned by the community, followed constantly by a drummer boy to mark her shame.

Roger Prynne eventually returns, having survived being shipwrecked and held captive by Native Americans during his time away. Concealing his identity under the alias "Dr. Roger Chillingworth," he begins to search for Hester's lover. In an effort to frame the Algonquian, Chillingworth murders and scalps a settler outside Hester’s home. The crime provokes conflict, and the colonists declare war on the Algonquian. Overwhelmed by guilt for sparking the violence, Chillingworth dies by suicide.

Amid the chaos, Hester is nearly executed alongside others but is saved when Dimmesdale publicly confesses that he is the father of her child. As he prepares to face punishment, the Algonquian launch an attack on the colony. Both sides suffer heavy losses, and in the aftermath, colonial leaders focus more on suppressing news of the conflict than on continuing Hester’s persecution. Hester removes her scarlet letter and leaves Massachusetts with Dimmesdale, heading south toward Carolina.

== Cast ==
- Demi Moore as Hester Prynne
- Gary Oldman as Rev. Arthur Dimmesdale
- Robert Duvall as Roger Prynne / Roger Chillingworth
- Lisa Joliffe-Andoh as Mituba
- Edward Hardwicke as John Bellingham
- Robert Prosky as Horace Stonehall
- Roy Dotrice as Rev. Thomas Cheever
- Joan Plowright as Harriet Hibbons
- Malcolm Storry as Major Dunsmuir
- Jim Bearden as Goodman Mortimer
- Larissa Lapchinski as Goody Mortimer
- Amy Wright as Goody Gotwick
- George Aguilar as Johnny Sassamon
- Tim Woodward as Brewster Stonehall
- Joan Gregson as Elizabeth Cheever
- Dana Ivey as Meredith Stonehall
- Diane Salinger as Margaret Bellingham
- Jocelyn Cunningham as Mary Rollings
- Francie Swift as Sally Short
- Sheldon Peters Wolfchild as Moskeegee
- Eric Schweig as Metacomet
- Kristin Fairlie as Faith Stonehall
- Sarah Campbell as Prudence Stonehall
- Judd Jones as Mr. Bobbins
- Kennetch Charlette as Tarratine Chief
- Jodhi May as Voice of Pearl
- Tallulah Belle Willis as Pearl (infant)
- Scout Willis as Toddler Pearl

== Production ==
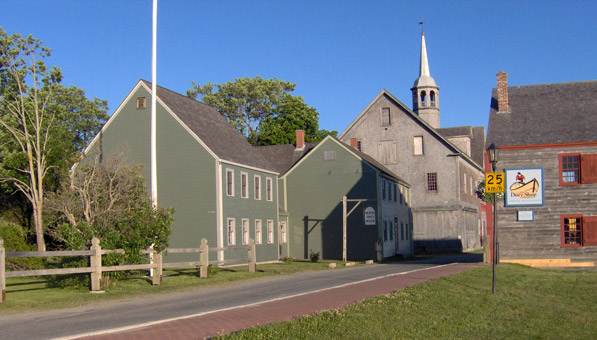
Shelburne, Nova Scotia waterfront showing grey paint finishes applied for the 1995 film.

The film was shot in British Columbia on Vancouver Island, in and around Campbell River (Beaverlodge Lands—now Rockland Road and North Island College/Timberline Secondary, Lupin Falls and Myra Falls in Strathcona Provincial Park, Little Oyster River, and White River), and in the Nova Scotia towns of Yarmouth, Shelburne, and in the small village of Saint Alphonse in Clare in 1994. In Shelburne, the waterfront area was substantially altered to resemble a Puritan New England town in the mid-17th century. Some of the buildings on Dock Street retain the grey-tone paint finishes used for the film.

Principal photography took place in 1994, with the film shot primarily in British Columbia on Vancouver Island, including locations around Campbell River such as the Beaverlodge Lands (now Rockland Road and North Island College/Timberline Secondary), Lupin Falls and Myra Falls in Strathcona Provincial Park, Little Oyster River, and White River. Additional scenes were filmed in Nova Scotia, in the towns of Yarmouth and Shelburne, as well as the village of Saint Alphonse in Clare. In Shelburne, the waterfront area was extensively modified to depict a 17th-century Puritan New England town, and several buildings on Dock Street still retain the grey-toned paint finishes applied during production.

=== Soundtrack ===
Three scores were associated with the film. Initially, Ennio Morricone submitted demo pieces drawing on his earlier collaboration with director Roland Joffé on The Mission, but none were formally recorded with an orchestra. Elmer Bernstein later composed a complete score, which was ultimately rejected. The final score was composed by John Barry, reportedly at the request of lead actress Demi Moore, who favored Barry due to his work on Indecent Proposal (1993). Barry's soundtrack was released on CD by Sony Records in 1995. Bernstein’s unused score was later released by Varèse Sarabande in 2008.

== Reception ==
=== Box office ===
The Scarlet Letter grossed approximately $35 million worldwide against a production budget of $46 million, making it a financial disappointment.

=== Critical reception ===
On the review aggregator website Rotten Tomatoes, 13% of 38 critics' reviews are positive, with an average rating of 3.4/10. The website's consensus reads: "The Scarlet Letter strays far from its classic source material to tell a story that strains for steamy sensuality and leaves the audience red with unintentional laughter." Audiences polled by CinemaScore gave the film a grade of "B" on an A+ to F scale.

Amy E. Schwartz of The Washington Post described the film as “unintentionally funny” and quoted a moviegoer who called it “the worst movie I’ve ever seen.” Chris Hicks of the Deseret News criticized its deviation from the source material, labeling it “Hollywood’s arrogance in its purest form.” Peter Stack of the San Francisco Chronicle offered a more favorable take, calling it a “well-acted, beautiful movie” while criticizing its musical score and narrative liberties. Film4 referred to the film as “dodgy but oddly entertaining.”

Over the years, The Scarlet Letter has remained widely regarded as one of the worst literary adaptations. Kevin Williamson of National Review called it a “combination of awfulness and inexplicability,” declaring it the worst film ever made. Sadie Trombetta of Bustle noted that it “has earned an almost permanent spot on every ‘Worst Movie of All Time’ list,” and author Libby Fischer Hellmann called it “widely cited as the worst film adaptation ever made.”

In defense of the changes, Demi Moore stated that the source novel was “very dense and not cinematic,” suggesting it was better suited for a television miniseries. She added that the revised ending was intended to retain the “ultimate message of Hester Prynne.” In 2011, Gary Oldman named the film as one of four he would take to a desert island, acknowledging the poor reviews but asserting, "There's some good work in there."

== Accolades ==
Award	Date of the ceremony	Category	Recipients	Result	Ref.
Stinkers Bad Movie Awards	1995	Worst Actress	Demi Moore	Nominated	
Golden Raspberry Awards	24 March 1996	Worst Picture	The Scarlet Letter	Nominated	
Golden Raspberry Awards	24 March 1996	Worst Director	Roland Joffé	Nominated	
Golden Raspberry Awards	24 March 1996	Worst Actress	Demi Moore	Nominated	
Golden Raspberry Awards	24 March 1996	Worst Supporting Actor	Robert Duvall	Nominated	
Golden Raspberry Awards	24 March 1996	Worst Screenplay	Douglas Day Stewart; based on the novel by Nathaniel Hawthorne	Nominated	
Golden Raspberry Awards	24 March 1996	Worst Screen Combo	Demi Moore and either Robert Duvall or Gary Oldman	Nominated	
Golden Raspberry Awards	24 March 1996	Worst Remake, Rip-off or Sequel	The Scarlet Letter	Won	
MTV Movie & TV Awards	8 June 1996	Most Desirable Female	Demi Moore	Nominated	

== See also ==
- List of films considered the worst
- List of films voted the best
