= Timberland =

Timberland may refer to:

== Places ==
- Timberland, Lincolnshire, a village in Lincolnshire, England
- Timberland, Wisconsin, an unincorporated community, US

== Other uses ==
- Timberland, land used for forestry and timber production
- Timberland (company), a manufacturer of outdoor wear and footwear including timber boots
- Timberland (board game), a German board game
- Timberland Regional Library, a public library system in Washington state, US
- Timberland High School (Missouri)
- Timberland High School (South Carolina)

== See also ==
- Timbaland (born 1972), American rapper and record producer
- Timberlake (disambiguation)
- Timberlane (disambiguation)
