= Timberline =

Timberline is an alternate term for the tree line.

It may also refer to:

== Places ==
- Timberline Lodge, a National Historic Landmark mountain lodge and ski area in Oregon, U.S.
  - Timberline Lodge ski area, the ski area surrounding the lodge
    - Timberline Four Seasons Resort, a ski area in West Virginia

== Products ==
- Timberline Software, owned by Sage Group since September 2003

== Schools ==
- Timberline High School (Boise, Idaho)
- Timberline High School (Weippe, Idaho)
- Timberline High School (Lacey, Washington)
- Timberline Secondary School

== Churches ==
- Timberline Church, Fort Collins, Colorado
- Timberline Church, Aztec. New Mexico

== See also ==
- Timberlane (disambiguation)
