= School District 72 Campbell River =

School district in British Columbia, Canada

Location
- Campbell River Campbell River in Vancouver Island Canada

District information
- Superintendent: Geoff Manning
- Schools: 24
- Budget: CA$75.4 million

Students and staff
- Students: 6110

Other information
- Website: www.sd72.bc.ca

School District 72 Campbell River is a school district on Vancouver Island in British Columbia. Centered in Campbell River it includes the more rural communities such as Sayward and the adjacent islands between Vancouver Island and mainland British Columbia such as Quadra and Cortes Island

== Schools ==
School	Location	Grades
Carihi Secondary School	Campbell River	9-12
Cedar Elementary School	Campbell River	K-5
Continuing Ed SD 72	Campbell River	12
Cortes Island Elem-Jr Secondary School	Mansons Landing	K-10
eBlend Program SD72	Campbell River	K-12
Ecole des Deux Mondes Elementary School	Campbell River	K-5
Georgia Park Elementary School	Campbell River	K-5
Ecole Phoenix Middle School	Campbell River	6-8
Headstart Program SD72	Campbell River	10
Oasis School	Campbell River	8-10
Ocean Grove Elementary School	Campbell River	K-5
Penfield Elementary School	Campbell River	K-5
Pinecrest Elementary School	Campbell River	K-5
Quadra Elementary School	Quathiaski Cove	K-5
Ripple Rock Elementary School	Campbell River	K-5
Sandowne Elementary School	Campbell River	K-5
Sayward Elem-Jr Secondary School	Sayward	K-9
Southgate Middle School	Campbell River	6-8
Surge Narrows Elementary School	Surge Narrows	K-5
Timberline Secondary School	Campbell River	9-12

== See also ==
- List of school districts in British Columbia
