= Samuel Campbell (doctor) =

Canadian Royal Navy officer

Samuel Campbell was the ship's surgeon on HMS Plumper from 1857 to 1861. He is thought to be the namesake of Campbell Island as well as the Campbell River on Vancouver Island. The Campbell River is, additionally, the namesake of the City of Campbell River.
