= Tahsis =

- Village
- Village of Tahsis
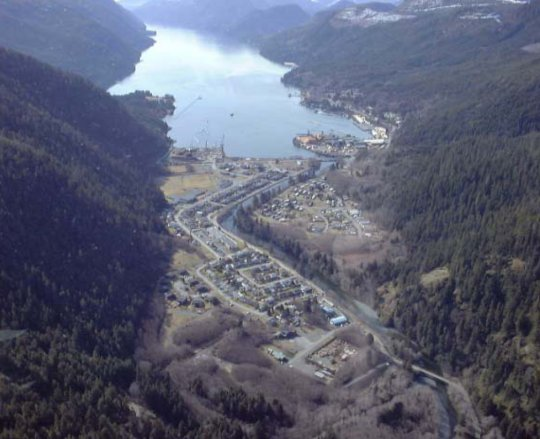
- Tahsis Inlet and Village

- Location of Tahsis in British Columbia Tahsis (British Columbia)
- Coordinates: 49°55′40″N 126°39′24″W
- Country: Canada
- Province: British Columbia
- Region: Vancouver Island
- Regional district: Strathcona
- Incorporated: 1970

Government
  - Governing body: Tahsis Village Council

Area
  - Total: 5.73 km^{2} (2.21 sq mi)
- Elevation: 30 m (98 ft)

Population (2019)
  - Total: approximately 300
- Time zone: UTC−07:00 (PT)
- Highways: 19
- Waterways: Pacific Ocean
- Climate: Cfb
- Website: Village of Tahsis

Tahsis is a village municipality on the west coast of Vancouver Island, British Columbia, Canada, about 300 km (186 mi) (by air) northwest of the provincial capital Victoria at 49°55′33″N 126°37′16″W. As of 2011, the Canadian census listed 316 residents, a decline from the 2006 Census count of 366 residents. The Village of Tahsis economy used to be dependent on forestry, but after the closure of the local sawmill in 2001, the economy became heavily dependent on sport fishing for salmon and halibut, outdoor recreation and tourism.

The village is situated at the head of the steep-sided Tahsis Inlet (part of Nootka Sound). The inlet is protected from Pacific storms by its geography, making the docking facilities a valuable asset.

In Tahsis' heyday the population was roughly 2,500. With the closure and dismantling of the mill the population declined to 892, according to the 2001 census.

== History ==
While First Nations peoples have inhabited the area for over 4,000 years, Europeans first visited Tahsis in 1774 (Spanish) and 1778 (English). John R. Jewitt, an English armourer, spent several winters here at the beginning of the nineteenth century as the slave of Maquinna. Jewitt's memoirs, A Narrative of the Adventures and Sufferings of John R. Jewitt, only survivor of the crew of the ship Boston, during a captivity of nearly three years among the first nations of Nootka Sound: with an account of the manners, mode of living, and religious opinions of the natives is a major source of information about the indigenous peoples of the Pacific Northwest Coast in general, and life in Tahsis in particular.

In the 1930s many companies tried unsuccessfully to open sawmill operations on the west coast of Vancouver Island. There were several advantages to building at Tahsis: there was a level plateau at the head of the inlet with easy deep-sea access for ocean-going vessels. The site faced southeast, getting maximum sunlight to protect the freshly cut lumber from mould due to the rains.

In 1937 Nootka Wood Products Limited started operations at what was initially called "Port Tasis", a name chosen by them in loose consultation with local First Nations. At the time, Nootka Wood Products was cutting approximately 150,000 board feet (350 m^{3}) of lumber daily, all for export.

Subsequently, a Tahsis mill was built by the Gibson Brothers in 1945. It burned down in 1948, but in January 1949, Gibson Mills and the East Asiatic Company formed a partnership (Tahsis Company) and by April a new mill was back in production. Before the mill was demolished, it was owned by Canadian Pacific Forest Products.

In 1962, it was reported that the Tahsis Lumber Company had "prohibited the import of all cars except one very small [un-named] German make" but that motorists "have one advantage over most: since their cars run only on private property they don't need a license".

Tahsis remained a company town until it was incorporated as a municipality in 1970. Tahsis was connected to Gold River by the Head Bay Road in 1972. Until that time the village was accessible only by boat or aircraft.

== Climate ==
Climate data for Tahsis (1981–2010)
Month	Jan	Feb	Mar	Apr	May	Jun	Jul	Aug	Sep	Oct	Nov	Dec	Year
Average precipitation mm (inches)	642.5 (25.30)	344.8 (13.57)	365.3 (14.38)	270.9 (10.67)	185.5 (7.30)	146.2 (5.76)	97.7 (3.85)	168.1 (6.62)	181.1 (7.13)	513.0 (20.20)	753.6 (29.67)	636.8 (25.07)	4,305.5 (169.51)
Average rainfall mm (inches)	636.0 (25.04)	330.6 (13.02)	358.3 (14.11)	270.6 (10.65)	185.5 (7.30)	146.2 (5.76)	97.7 (3.85)	168.1 (6.62)	181.1 (7.13)	513.0 (20.20)	748.5 (29.47)	625.0 (24.61)	4,260.6 (167.74)
Average snowfall cm (inches)	6.5 (2.6)	14.2 (5.6)	7.0 (2.8)	0.3 (0.1)	0.0 (0.0)	0.0 (0.0)	0.0 (0.0)	0.0 (0.0)	0.0 (0.0)	0.0 (0.0)	5.1 (2.0)	11.8 (4.6)	44.9 (17.7)
Average precipitation days (≥ 0.2 mm)	18.8	13.2	17.5	14.7	12.9	13.1	8.0	8.9	9.8	16.5	18.5	17.5	169.4
Average rainy days (≥ 0.2 mm)	18.4	12.9	17.4	14.7	12.9	13.1	8.0	8.9	9.8	16.5	18.2	16.7	167.6
Average snowy days (≥ 0.2 cm)	1.7	1.6	1.7	0.18	0.0	0.0	0.0	0.0	0.0	0.0	0.89	1.8	7.8
Source: Environment Canada

== Demographics ==
In the 2021 Census of Population conducted by Statistics Canada, Tahsis had a population of 393 living in 231 of its 398 total private dwellings, a change of 58.5% from its 2016 population of 248. With a land area of 5.26 km^{2} (2.03 sq mi), it had a population density of 74.7/km^{2} (193.5/sq mi) in 2021.

Religious groups in Tahsis (1991−2021)
Religious group	2021		1991	
Religious group	Pop.	%	Pop.	%
Christian	90	24.66%	805	73.85%
Sikh	0	0%	90	8.26%
Buddhist	0	0%	0	0%
Jewish	0	0%	0	0%
Hindu	0	0%	0	0%
Muslim	0	0%	0	0%
Indigenous spirituality	0	0%	N/A	N/A
Other religion	25	6.85%	0	0%
Irreligious	255	69.86%	190	17.43%
Total responses	365		1,090	

== First Nations ==
The members of the Mowachaht/Muchalaht, Nuchatlaht and Ehattesaht First Nations are the Nuu-chah-nulth-speaking tribes whose traditional territories included all of the area known today as Nootka Sound. The Nootka Sound First Nations' territories are bounded on the north by those of the Kyuquot/Cheklesahht, and on the south by those of the Hesquiaht. Archaeological evidence confirms the occupation of the region for over 4,200 years.

== Events ==
- The Great Walk (June)
- Tahsis Days (July)

== See also ==
- Gold River
- List of francophone communities in British Columbia
- Strathcona Provincial Park
