= Timberlake =

Timberlake may refer to:

== People ==
- Amy Timberlake, American author
- Aminu Timberlake (born 1973), American basketball player
- Bob Timberlake (American football) (born 1943), former All-American college and NFL football player
- Bob Timberlake (artist) (born 1937), North Carolina painter, artist and designer of clothing and furniture
- Charles B. Timberlake (1854–1941), former U.S. Representative from Colorado
- Chris Timberlake (born 1985), professional basketball player for the Purefoods Tender Juicy Giants of the PBA
- Craig Timberlake (1920–2006), American stage actor
- Gary Timberlake (born 1948), former Major League Baseball pitcher
- Henry Timberlake (1730–1765), colonial American officer, journalist, and cartographer
- Henry Timberlake (merchant adventurer) (1570–1625), prosperous London ship captain
- James Timberlake (1846–1891), American lawman
- Jeff Timberlake, American politician
- John B. Timberlake, American historical figure involved in the Pettycoat affair
- Justin Timberlake (born 1981), American singer-songwriter and actor
- Jessica Biel, also known as Jessica Timberlake (born 1982), American actress
- Philip Hunter Timberlake (1883–1981), American entomologist
- Richard Timberlake (1922–2020), American free banking economist
- Timberlake Wertenbaker (born 1946), writer

== Places ==
- Cape Timberlake, Antarctica

United States

- Erlanger, Kentucky, previously known as Timberlake
- Timberlake, New Mexico
- Timberlake, North Carolina
- Timberlake, Ohio
- Timberlake, Virginia
- Timberlake High School, Spirit Lake, Idaho

== Animals ==
- Timberlake (horse), an American thoroughbred horse

== Other uses ==
- Timberlake Expedition, a 1760 excursion into the Overhill Cherokee lands west of the Appalachian Mountains
- Timberlake v. State, a 1980 Georgia Supreme Court decision

== See also ==
- Timber Lake (disambiguation)
- Timberland (disambiguation)
- Timber
- Lake
