= Muchalat Inlet =

Inlet in British Columbia

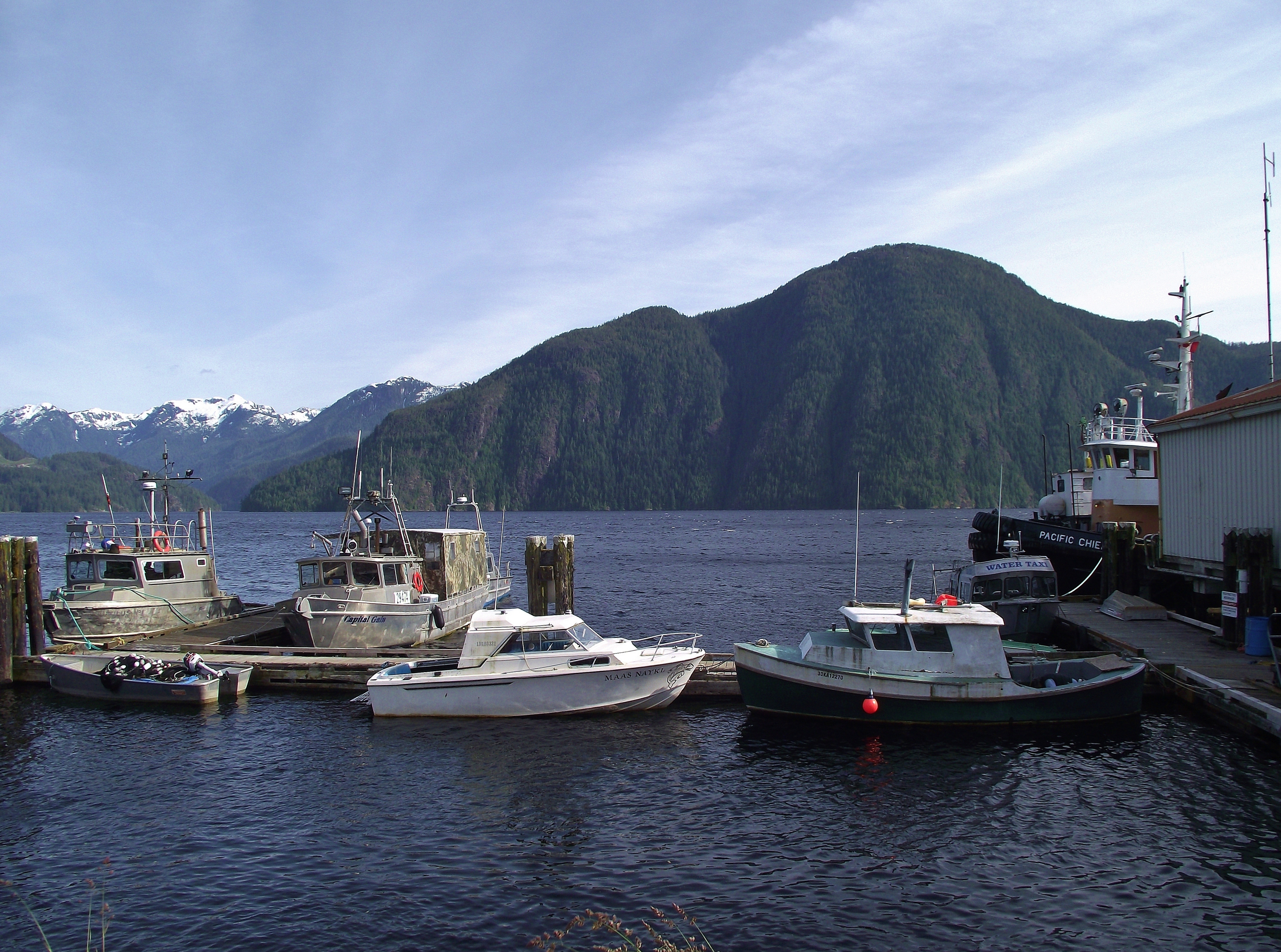
Muchalat Inlet

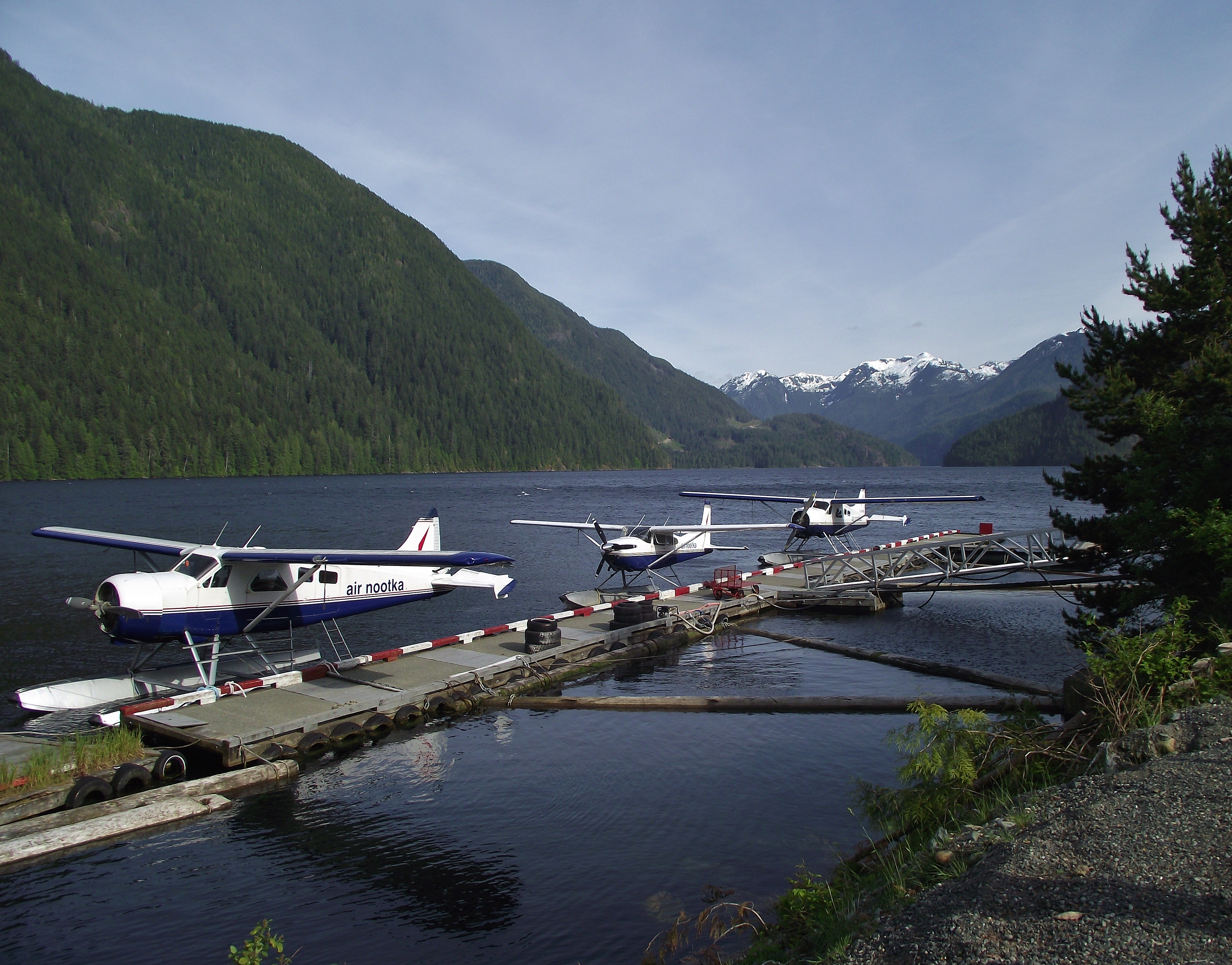
Muchalat Inlet

Muchalat Inlet is an oceanographic/geographical region on the western coast of Vancouver Island, British Columbia, Canada. Muchalat Inlet extends 55 km (34 mi) from Nootka Sound to the east, terminating at Muchalat Bay. Located broadly south of Gold River, British Columbia, the area borders Mowachaht/Muchalaht First Nations reserve lands. The inlet is somewhat under-researched, with a complex runoff/renewal cycle supported by drainage from mountain terrain in the surrounding region. The inlet's maximum depth is 380 m (1,250 ft) and serves as a staging area for log exports, fishing, a ferry, and seasonal tourism and sporting activities. “Muchalat” is the current conventional spelling for mapping purposes, distinct from the current English spelling of the Muchalaht First Nations band for which it is named.

Though remote, the region gained some notice in 2004–2006 during the Luna incident, in which policies regarding an orca separated from its pod led to confrontations between the Department of Fisheries and Oceans and the borders Mowachaht/Muchalaht First Nations.
