= Carihi Secondary School =

Carihi Secondary

Location
- 350 Dogwood Road; Campbell River, British Columbia, V9W 2X9; Canada; 50.014147°N 125.248017°W

Information
- School type: Public, high school
- Motto: Home of the Tyees
- Founded: 1965
- School board: SD 72 Vancouver Island and School District 93 Conseil scolaire francophone
- Principal: Mr. Sean McLaughlin
- Staff: 52 teachers, 24 support staff
- Grades: 9-12
- Enrollment: approx. 900 (September 19, 2015)
- Language: English/French
- Area: Campbell River, Quadra Island, Cortes Island
- Colour
- Mascot: Tyee
- Team name: Carihi Tyees
- Website: www.sd72.bc.ca/school/carihi/Pages/default.aspx

Carihi Secondary is a public high school in Campbell River, British Columbia part of School District 72 and School District 93 Conseil scolaire francophone.

Carihi School opened in 1965 to accommodate the overpopulated River Campbell Elementary School (now known as Ecole Phoenix Middle School). In the 1980s, the school was called "Campbell River High". The students began calling it Carihi and eventually the name was changed.

On November 21, 2024, a fire broke out at the school, causing the facility to be shut down for over a week. The cause of the fire was determined to be spontaneous combustion. In March 2025, plans to demolish the areas of the school affected by the fire were announced by School District 72.

In May of 2026, several Carihi Secondary School band members on an annual trip to Victoria went to the provincial legislature to demand action from the Minister of Infrastructure after parts of their school remain closed from the fire almost two years later. Students expressed frustration at the lack of progress and absence of communication from the Province. Less than two months later, funding was approved and a Request for Proposal was issued by School District 72 for the rebuild of the damaged parts of the school.
