= Bell v. State =

Bell v. the State
- Court: Supreme Court of Georgia
- Decided: July 9, 1971
- Citation: 227 Ga. 800, 183 S.E.2d 357 (1971)

Case opinions
- unofficial copy

Bell v. the State of Georgia, 227 Ga. 800, 183 S.E.2d 357 (1971) is one of several cases in which the Supreme Court of Georgia set forth the standard by which an extraordinary motion for a new trial is to be judged.

In order for a defendant to succeed when making such a motion after having discovered new evidence, the defendant must show

1. that the evidence has come to his knowledge since the trial;
2. that it was not owing to the want of due diligence that he did not acquire it sooner;
3. that it is so material that it would probably produce a different verdict;
4. that it is not cumulative only;
5. that the affidavit of the witness himself should be procured or its absence accounted for; and
6. that a new trial will not be granted if the only effect of the evidence will be to impeach the credit of a witness.

These six criteria have appeared in a number of other decisions of the Georgia Supreme Court, including Timberlake v. the State and the majority opinion in Davis v. the State (see Troy Anthony Davis).

The case stemmed from an appeal for a conviction centered on child hearsay testimony. This court decision and similar ones in the same and other U.S. states are designed to ensure the finality of jury verdicts. It is therefore necessary for defense lawyers to present all exculpatory evidence at trial rather than bringing such evidence before the courts in a piecemeal manner; however, some have criticized the principle of finality of jury verdicts as increasing the possibility of errors in death penalty cases.
