= Timberlane =

- Cass Timberlane is the title character in a Sinclair Lewis novel.

Timberlane may also refer to a community or school in the United States:

Communities

- Timberlane, Illinois, a village
- Timberlane, Louisiana, a census-designated place

Schools

- Timberlane Regional High School, Plaistow, New Hampshire
- Timberlane Regional Middle School, Plaistow, New Hampshire
- Timberlane Middle School, Mercer County, New Jersey

== See also ==
- Timberland (disambiguation)
- Timberline (disambiguation)
