= Kris Fredheim =

Canadian ice hockey player

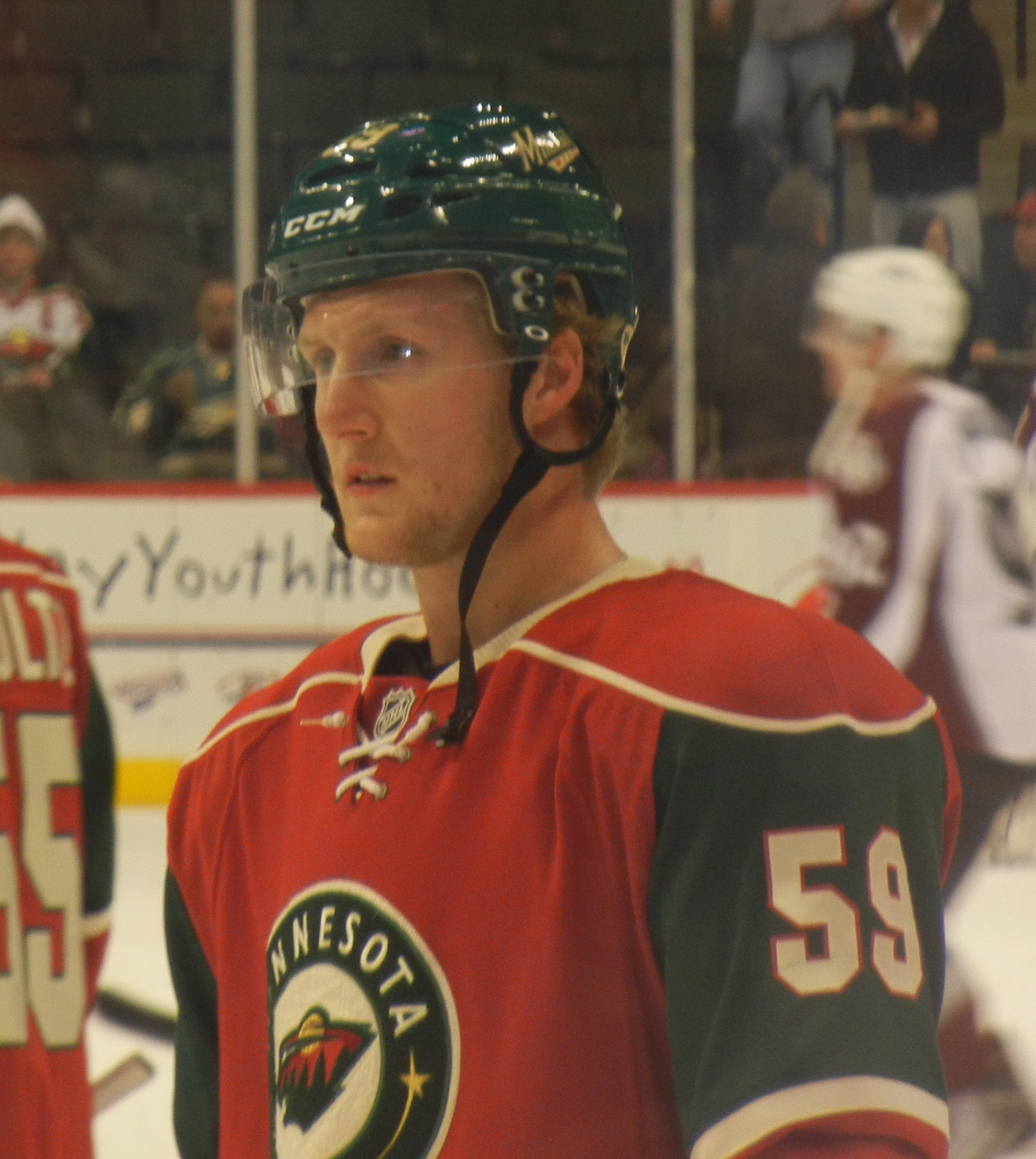
- Born: February 23, 1987 (age 39) Campbell River, British Columbia, Canada
- Height: 6 ft 2 in (188 cm)
- Weight: 194 lb (88 kg; 13 st 12 lb)
- Position: Defence
- Shot: Right
- Played for: Minnesota Wild
- NHL draft: 185th overall, 2005; Vancouver Canucks
- Playing career: 2010–2015

Kris Allen Fredheim (born February 23, 1987) is a Canadian former professional ice hockey defenceman. He has previously played with the Minnesota Wild of the National Hockey League (NHL). He was selected by the Vancouver Canucks in the sixth round (185th overall) of the 2005 NHL entry draft.

== Playing career ==
Kris played collegiate hockey at Colorado College of the Western Collegiate Hockey Association.

On November 16, 2011, the Minnesota Wild signed Fredheim to a two-year entry-level contract. On November 17, 2011, he made his National Hockey League debut recording 10:13 of ice time for the Wild.

On September 23, 2013, Fredheim was signed to a one-year AHL contract with the St. John's IceCaps for the 2013–14 season. He appeared in two seasons with the IceCaps, serving as an alternate captain in his final professional season in 2014–15.

== Career statistics ==
=== Regular season and playoffs ===
			Regular season					Playoffs
Season	Team	League	GP	G	A	Pts	PIM	GP	G	A	Pts	PIM
2002–03	Notre Dame Argos AAA	SMHL	41	1	10	11	34	—	—	—	—	—
2003–04	Notre Dame Hounds AAA	SMHL	41	9	21	30	38	—	—	—	—	—
2004–05	Notre Dame Hounds	SJHL	50	2	15	17	28	—	—	—	—	—
2005–06	Notre Dame Hounds	SJHL	52	12	23	35	75	11	2	9	11	15
2006–07	Colorado College	WCHA	23	1	3	4	16	—	—	—	—	—
2007–08	Colorado College	WCHA	34	1	4	5	24	—	—	—	—	—
2008–09	Colorado College	WCHA	32	2	5	7	40	—	—	—	—	—
2009–10	Colorado College	WCHA	36	4	12	16	46	—	—	—	—	—
2009–10	Victoria Salmon Kings	ECHL	—	—	—	—	—	5	0	1	1	0
2010–11	Houston Aeros	AHL	66	3	6	9	24	—	—	—	—	—
2011–12	Houston Aeros	AHL	73	3	9	12	29	4	0	0	0	2
2011–12	Minnesota Wild	NHL	3	0	0	0	2	—	—	—	—	—
2012–13	Houston Aeros	AHL	52	1	6	7	20	—	—	—	—	—
2013–14	St. John's IceCaps	AHL	48	1	4	5	46	11	0	1	1	6
2014–15	St. John's IceCaps	AHL	60	2	5	7	45	—	—	—	—	—
AHL totals			299	10	30	40	164	15	0	1	1	8
NHL totals			3	0	0	0	2	—	—	—	—	—

=== International ===
Year	Team	Event	GP	G	A	Pts	PIM
2004	Canada Western	U17	6	1	1	2	4
Junior totals			6	1	1	2	4

== Awards and honours ==
Award	Year
SJHL
Best Defenceman	2005–06
First All-Star Team	2005–06
