= Roosevelt, Burnett County, Wisconsin =

Roosevelt, Wisconsin
- Town
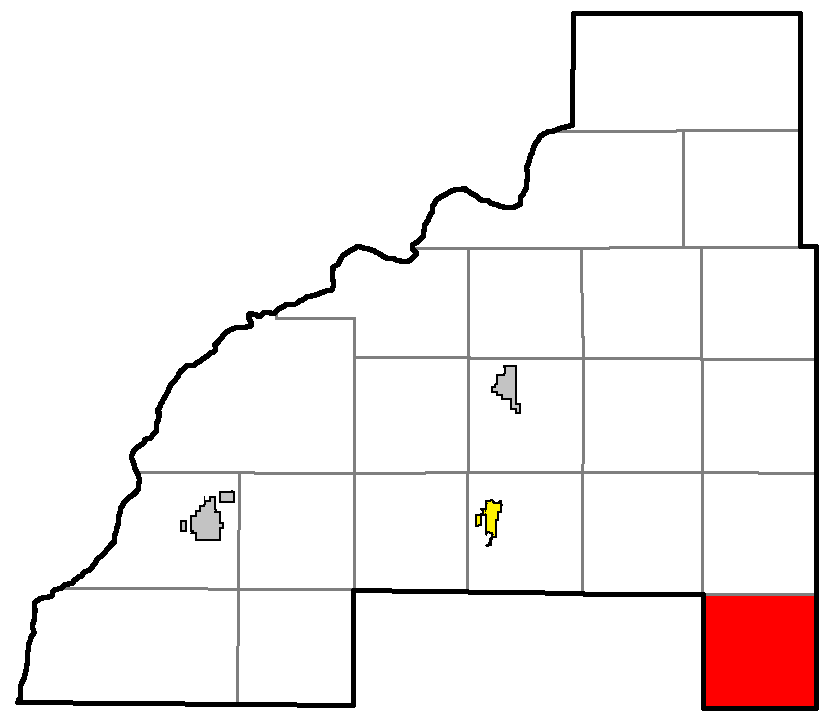
- Location of Roosevelt, within Burnett County
- Coordinates: 45°41′45″N 92°5′24″W
- Country: United States
- State: Wisconsin
- County: Burnett

Area
  - Total: 35.3 sq mi (91.5 km^{2})
  - Land: 35.1 sq mi (91.0 km^{2})
  - Water: 0.23 sq mi (0.6 km^{2})
- Elevation: 1,201 ft (366 m)

Population (2020)
  - Total: 197
  - Density: 5.61/sq mi (2.16/km^{2})
- Time zone: UTC-6 (Central (CST))
  - Summer (DST): UTC-5 (CDT)
- Area codes: 715 & 534
- FIPS code: 55-69325
- GNIS feature ID: 1584061
- Website: http://townofroosevelt.com/

Roosevelt is a town in Burnett County in the U.S. state of Wisconsin. The population was 197 at the 2020 census. The unincorporated community of Timberland is located in the town.

== Geography ==
Roosevelt is located in the southeast corner of Burnett County and is bordered by Washburn County to the east, Barron County to the south, and Polk County to the west. According to the United States Census Bureau, the town has a total area of 35.3 square miles (91.5 km^{2}), of which 35.1 square miles (91.0 km^{2}) is land and 0.23 square miles (0.6 km^{2}), or 0.61%, is water.

== Demographics ==
As of the census of 2000, there were 197 people, 78 households, and 59 families residing in the town. The population density was 5.6 people per square mile (2.2/km^{2}). There were 145 housing units at an average density of 4.1 per square mile (1.6/km^{2}). The racial makeup of the town was 98.48% White and 1.52% Native American.

There were 78 households, out of which 26.9% had children under the age of 18 living with them, 71.8% were married couples living together, 2.6% had a female householder with no husband present, and 23.1% were non-families. 19.2% of all households were made up of individuals, and 3.8% had someone living alone who was 65 years of age or older. The average household size was 2.53 and the average family size was 2.88.

In the town, the population was spread out, with 21.3% under the age of 18, 4.1% from 18 to 24, 22.3% from 25 to 44, 35.0% from 45 to 64, and 17.3% who were 65 years of age or older. The median age was 47 years. For every 100 females, there were 114.1 males. For every 100 females age 18 and over, there were 103.9 males.

The median income for a household in the town was $34,500, and the median income for a family was $43,750. Males had a median income of $30,750 versus $20,833 for females. The per capita income for the town was $17,586. About 1.8% of families and 6.0% of the population were below the poverty line, including 4.4% of those under the age of eighteen and none of those 65 or over.
