= Timberland, Wisconsin =

- Unincorporated community
- Location within Wisconsin Location within the United States
- Coordinates: 45°40′34″N 92°06′22″W
- Country: United States
- State: Wisconsin
- County: Burnett
- Town: Roosevelt
- Elevation: 1,322 ft (403 m)
- Time zone: UTC-6 (Central (CST))
  - Summer (DST): UTC-5 (CDT)
- Area codes: 715 and 534
- GNIS feature ID: 1577853

Timberland is an unincorporated community located in the town of Roosevelt, Burnett County, Wisconsin, United States.

== History ==
"Timberland, some forty miles southeast of Grantsburg in 37-14, took its name from the vast forests in that section at the time the office was established."
