= Timberlake v. State =

Timberlake v. the State
- Court: Supreme Court of Georgia (U.S. state)
- Decided: September 23, 1980
- Citation: 246 Ga. 488, 271 S.E.2d 792

Case opinions
- unofficial copy

Timberlake v. the State of Georgia, 246 Ga. 488, 271 S.E.2d 792 (1980), is a case in which the Georgia Supreme Court lists the requirements that a defendant must meet when making an extraordinary motion for new trial. The Georgia Supreme Court relied on its decision in Timberlake as precedent in support of its decision on March 17, 2008 not to order a new trial in the controversial case of Troy Anthony Davis.

== Facts and procedural posture ==
The defendant in the Timberlake case was convicted by a jury of the murder of Herbert Bishop Edwards, which had taken place on September 20, 1979. Two eyewitnesses had identified Timberlake as the killer, and evidence had been introduced that Timberlake had made some phone calls in which he had asked to speak to somebody who knew an escaped prisoner who was later found with the murder weapon. His defense was that he was at a courthouse renewing a pistol license at the time that the murder had taken place.

After his conviction, Timberlake filed a motion to request a retrial. In 246 Ga. 488 (1980), the Supreme Court of Georgia upheld the decision of the lower court not to grant the defendant's motion for a new trial.

== Significance ==
=== Holding ===
In Timberlake, the Court reiterated its earlier holdings in a long line of cases in which it had defined six criteria that a defendant must meet when requesting a retrial based on the discovery of new evidence:

1. that the evidence has come to his knowledge since the trial;
2. that it was not owing to the want of due diligence that he did not acquire it sooner;
3. that it is so material that it would probably produce a different verdict;
4. that it is not cumulative only;
5. that the affidavit of the witness himself should be procured or its absence accounted for; and
6. that a new trial will not be granted if the only effect of the evidence will be to impeach the credit of a witness.

This list of six criteria has appeared, with almost identical wording, in a number of Georgia Supreme Court cases; see, e.g., 'Bell v. the State', 227 Ga. 800, 183 S.E.2d 357 (1971).

=== Application in the Davis case ===
In the case of Davis v. the State, the defendant, who is under a sentence of death for a murder that he says that he did not commit, filed an extraordinary motion for a new trial. The Georgia Supreme Court, applying the standard set forth in the Timberlake case, affirmed the decision of the lower court to deny the defendant's motion without an evidentiary hearing. As a result, Davis' appeals are nearly exhausted, and he may be executed unless granted clemency by the State Board of Pardons and Paroles.

== See also ==
- Bell v. the State
