= Mowachaht/Muchalaht First Nations =

Nuu-chah-nulth band government in British Columbia, Canada

Mowachaht/Muchalaht
- Band No. 630
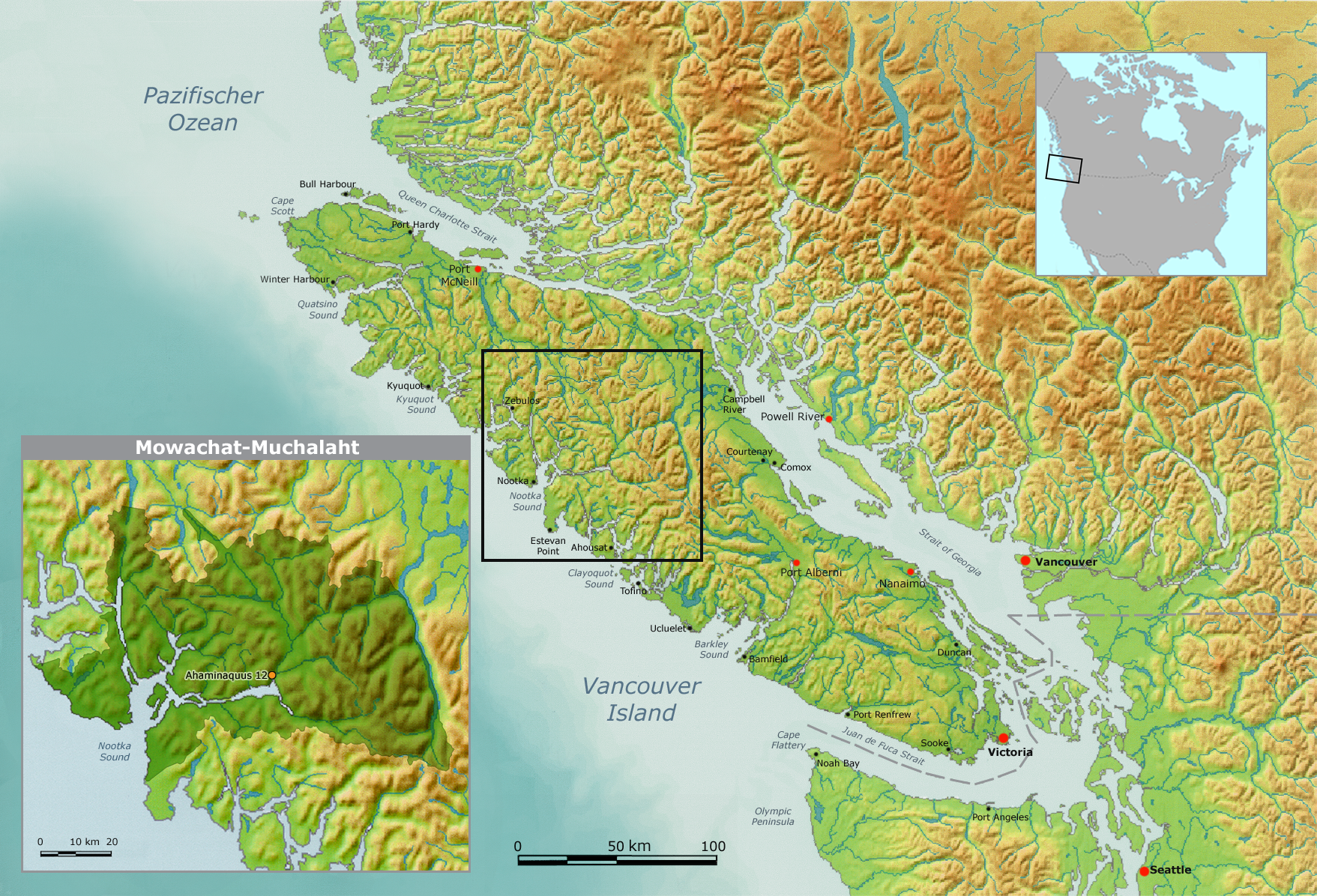
- People: Nuu-chah-nulth
- Headquarters: Gold River
- Province: British Columbia

Land
- Main reserve: Ahaminaquus 12
- Land area: 3.88 km^{2} (1.50 sq mi)

Population (2025)
- On reserve: 223
- On other land: 37
- Off reserve: 350
- Total population: 610

Government
- Chief: Michael Maquinna
- Council: Daniel Savey Sr.; Patrick James; Jerome Jack

Tribal Council
- Nuu-chah-nulth Tribal Council

Website
- www.mmfn.ca

The Mowachaht/Muchalaht First Nations are a First Nations government on the west coast of Vancouver Island in the Canadian province of British Columbia. The Mowachaht/Muchalaht First Nations are a member nation of the Nuu-chah-nulth Tribal Council, which spans all Nuu-chah-nulth-aht peoples except for the Pacheedaht First Nation.

Their main reserve is at Gold River, British Columbia but the Mowachaht are originally from Yuquot on Nootka Sound, known to history as Friendly Cove, scene of the Nootka Incident and, later, the negotiations and eventual implementation of the Nootka Conventions between Britain and Spain, hosted by the Mowachaht chief Maquinna.

== Name ==
The Muchalaht (pronounced [muwat͡ʃʼatħ]), live inland, which is rare for Nuu-chah-nulth peoples as most live by the sea. The Mowachaht people are a fishing community on the ocean's coast. The groups were formerly the Tahsis and Tlupana Inlet communities, but combined into one nation as their numbers dwindled from war and European disease.

== History ==
In the mid-to-late 18th century, first contact between indigenous peoples in what is now British Columbia, Canada and European explorers first happened in Yuquot.

In 1979, Chief Jerry Jack traveled to Copenhagen to meet with the Danish government and the Danish corporation East Asiatic Company to protest the pollution of Mowachaht-Muchalaht lands by the Tahsis mill.

On July 27, 2006, Chief Jerry Jack of the Mowachaht-Muchalaht First Nations died during an intertribal canoe journey in the Strait of Juan de Fuca, near Dungeness Spit. Two other members of the canoe's crew were sent to hospital in Port Angeles, Washington. Chief Jack was well known for his involvement with the story of Luna, a young orphaned human-friendly orca who frequented Nootka Sound and was killed by a boat propeller in 2006.

== See also ==
- Nuu-chah-nulth
- Nuu-chah-nulth language
- Nuu-chah-nulth Tribal Council
- Maquinna
