= HMS Plumper =

Five ships of the Royal Navy have borne the name HMS Plumper:

- HMS Plumper (1794) was a 12-gun gunvessel launched in 1794 and sold in 1802.
- HMS Plumper (1804) was a 12-gun gun-brig launched in 1804 and captured in the action of 15 July 1805. The French Navy took Plumper into service, renaming her Argus in 1814, Plumper again in 1815, and Argus again later that year. She was condemned in 1822 at Saint-Louis, Senegal, and struck in 1827,
- HMS Plumper (1807) was a 12-gun gun-brig launched in 1807 and wrecked in 1812 in the Bay of Fundy while en route to Halifax with £70,000 in specie for the purchase of arms for the military in St John. She sank immediately with the loss of the specie and 42 of 60 people on board, consisting both of crew and passengers.
- HMS Plumper (1813) was a 12-gun gun-brig launched in 1813 and sold in 1833.
- HMS Plumper (1848) was a unique wooden screw sloop launched in 1848 and sold in 1865.
