= Luna (orca) =

Male orca notable for human contact in Nootka Sound (1999–2006)

L98 Luna
- Luna in Nootka Sound in 2004
- Species: Orca
- Sex: Male
- Born: c. 19 September 1999; Puget Sound, Washington, United States
- Died: 10 March 2006 (aged 6); Nootka Sound, Canada
- Parent: Splash (L67) (mother) (1985–2008)

L98 or Luna (c. 19 September 1999 – 10 March 2006), also known as Tsux'iit, was an orca born in Puget Sound. After being separated from his mother, Splash (1985–2008) while still young, Luna spent five years in Nootka Sound, an ocean inlet of western Vancouver Island, where he had extensive human contact and became recognized internationally.

Although Luna was healthy and his presence in the area attracted extensive publicity, there were concerns that his behavior could endanger watercraft and people. After years of debate, the Canadian Department of Fisheries and Oceans (DFO) authorized an effort in June 2004 to rescue Luna and return him to his pod. The plan was opposed by the Mowachaht/Muchalaht First Nations, who claimed to believe Luna was the reincarnation of a former chief. Remaining alone in Nootka Sound, Luna was killed accidentally by a tugboat propeller on March 10, 2006.

== Early life ==
L98 Luna was born into a population known as the Southern Resident community, consisting of three families called "pods": J-pod, K-pod and L-pod. This population, which consisted of approximately 83 killer whales at the time of L98's birth, was studied since the 1970s. Scientists recognized each individual in the population by photo-identification, and tracked individual movements and social relationships over decades. L98 was born into a group in L-pod known as the L2 matriline, which consisted of the matriarch, Grace (L2) (1960–2012) who was Luna's maternal grandmother; L98's maternal uncles: Orcan (L39) (1975–2000); Gaia (L78) (1989–2012); Wavewalker (L88) (born 1993); and L98's mother, Splash (L67) (1985–2008). L98 was first seen on the morning of 19 September 1999, near the San Juan Islands of Washington as a newborn alone with his mother, Splash. Later that day, L98 was seen leaving his mother, Splash to follow orcas from K-pod, and did not reconnect with her until several days later. On 26 September, L98 was seen nursing from Splash (L67).

Luna was given the name "L98" at birth according to the scientific naming conventions for resident killer whales. A Seattle newspaper held a naming contest in 2000, resulting in L98 being given the second name Luna, Latin for moon. At the time, it was not known if Luna was male or female. The contest winner, an eight-year-old from Bellingham, Washington, explained, "The orca whale explores the ocean like the moon explores the Earth and that is why his/her name is Luna."

Southern Resident killer whales spend summers in Haro Strait and the waters near southeastern Vancouver Island, including the Juan de Fuca Strait and Strait of Georgia, leaving the area each fall and returning in the spring. It is not known where they spend the winter, although have been seen along the northern coast of British Columbia to as far south as California. Southern Resident orcas are considered an endangered species by the governments of Canada and the United States.

== Appearance in Nootka Sound ==
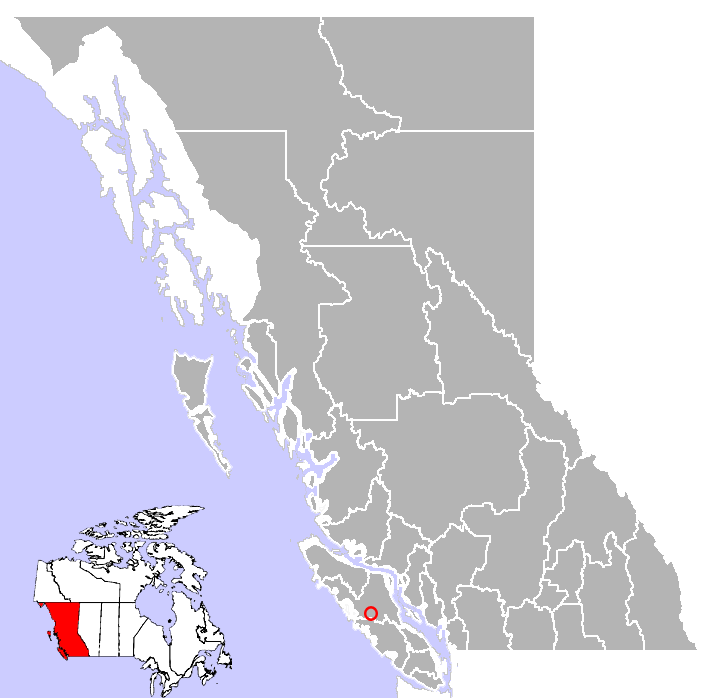
Location of Nootka Sound on the west coast of Vancouver Island, British Columbia

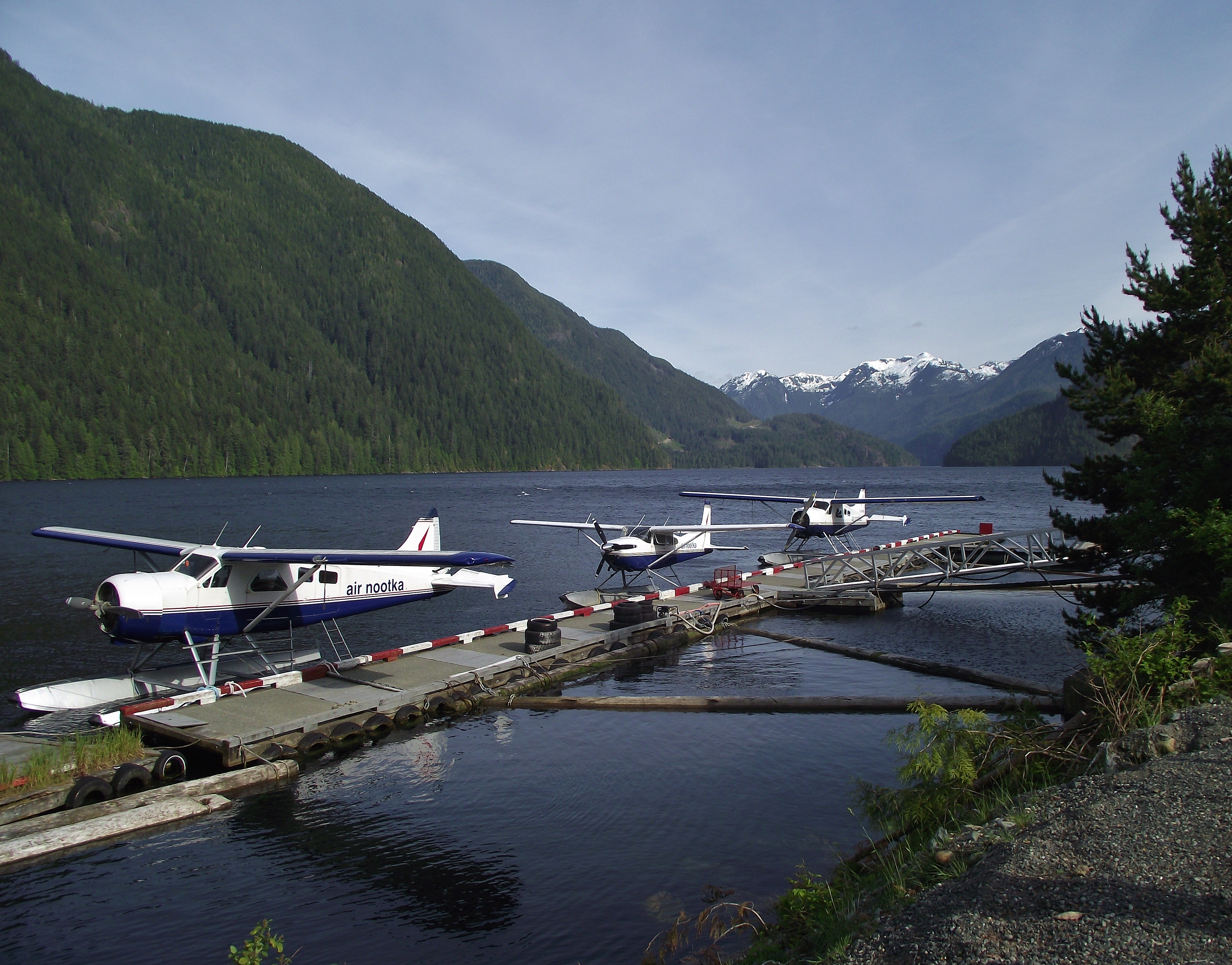
Float plane dock at Muchalat Inlet of Nootka Sound

Over the winter of 2000–2001, five members of L-pod disappeared, considerably more than the typical mortality rate of one or two animals per year. In July 2001, Luna — with an estimated length of 12 feet (3.7 m) — reappeared alone in Muchalat Inlet of Nootka Sound, and by the fall, appeared to be in good health, feeding on sardines. Muchalat Inlet extends inland from Nootka Sound, approximately 10 kilometres (6.2 mi) wide, 55 kilometres (34 mi) long, and with a maximum depth of 340 metres (1,120 ft), to the town of Gold River on the west coast of Vancouver Island.

The Mowachaht/Muchalaht First Nations band named Luna "Tsux'iit" when he appeared in Gold River Inlet a few days after the death of Chief Ambrose Maguinna. Because the Chief had allegedly said he wished to return after death as an orca or wolf, the band claimed to believe that the appearance of Luna was symbolic and likely to be the reincarnation of Maguinna. Others claim that the band invented this story as an ad hoc justification for keeping Luna captive in the Sound as a tourist attraction.

Initially, Luna avoided boats and kept his distance from people. DFO tried to keep Luna's presence in Nootka Sound a secret until December 2001, by which time he had been there for six months. International attention was diverted from Luna when Springer (A73) appeared alone in Puget Sound, becoming the orca center of attention in 2002.

== Contact with humans ==
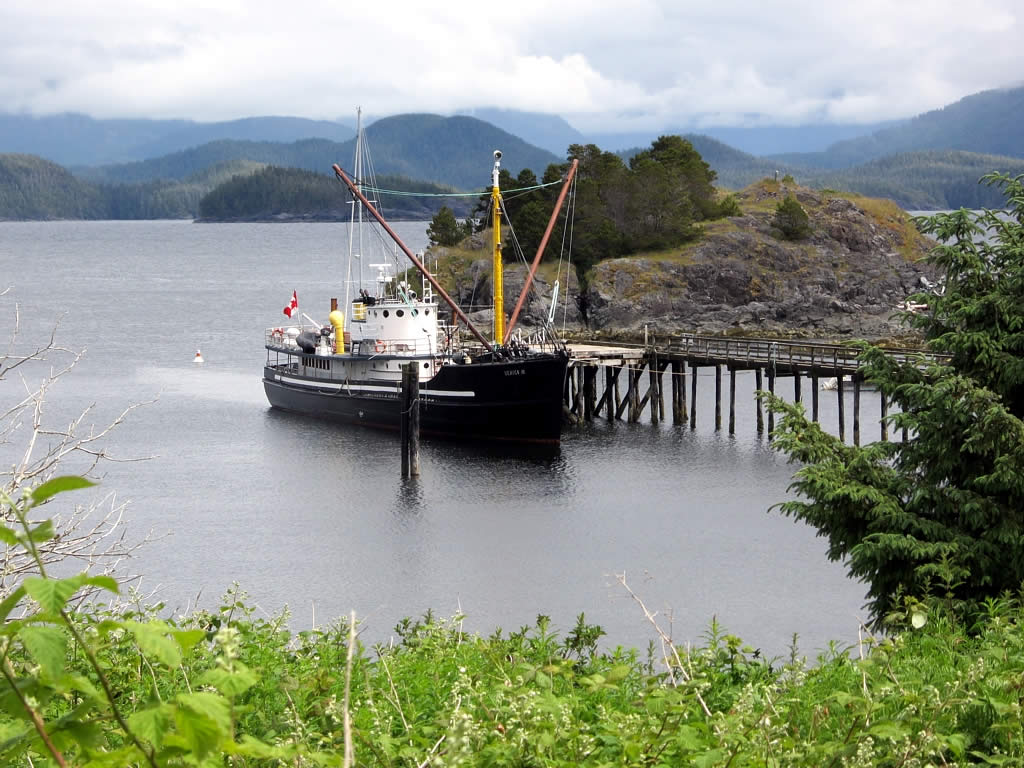
The Uchuck III at Friendly Cove in Muchalat Inlet, June 2012

By September 2002, Luna was determined to follow boats, such as the Uchuck III, which traveled Nootka Sound regularly to deliver supplies to fishing camps and loggers. Luna followed the boat to a dock at Gold River where his curiosity and playfulness caused damage to vessels and a float plane. Some people were fined for petting Luna. Observers of Luna's friendly behavior concluded that it was not possible to keep him away from people, conceding that human interaction was warranted for his social benefit until he could be reunited with his pod.

Killer whales are intensely social, and boats and people seemed to provide the companionship and physical contact that Luna would normally have received from his orca pod. Many Gold River residents and tourists found Luna to be highly social, interactive, and playful.

It is illegal in Canada for observers to disturb a wild marine mammal, and for Southern Resident orcas, a 400 metres (440 yd) minimum distance is required. Cetaceans which lose their fear of boats generally fare poorly in the long term, as they can be injured by boat propellers. DFO posted signs asking the public to keep its distance from Luna, and sent out monitors to educate the public and keep them away from Luna.

== Stewardship ==
From 2002–2006, interacting programs of stewardship formed to protect L98 Luna, with aspirations of returning him to join his pod in the Pacific. Beginning in 2002, Canadian and American whale advocacy organizations, some forming a Luna Stewardship Fund, pressured the Canadian and US governments and the public to move L98 Luna out of Nootka Sound and return him to his pod in the open ocean. By October 2003, the Canadian Department of Fisheries and Oceans (DFO) was collaborating with the U.S. National Marine Fisheries Service on a plan to lure L98 Luna toward a reunion with his pod where he could hear his family's calls. If that plan failed, an alternate plan was to catch L98 Luna in a net pen in the Gold River marina, then transfer him by truck to near Victoria where he would be released to make an acoustic connection with his pod. In 2004, the Mowachaht-Muchalaht First Nation people of Gold River — interpreting L98 Luna as their reincarnated tribal chief — opposed DFO attempts to capture him, and used canoes to lead L98 Luna 30 miles (48 km) westward along Nootka Sound toward the ocean. The effort proved unsuccessful when Luna returned to Gold River, and the DFO called off the relocation plans. Joint plans by the DFO and Mowachaht-Muchalaht First Nation people for Luna's stewardship persisted through early 2006.

== Attempts for pod reunion ==
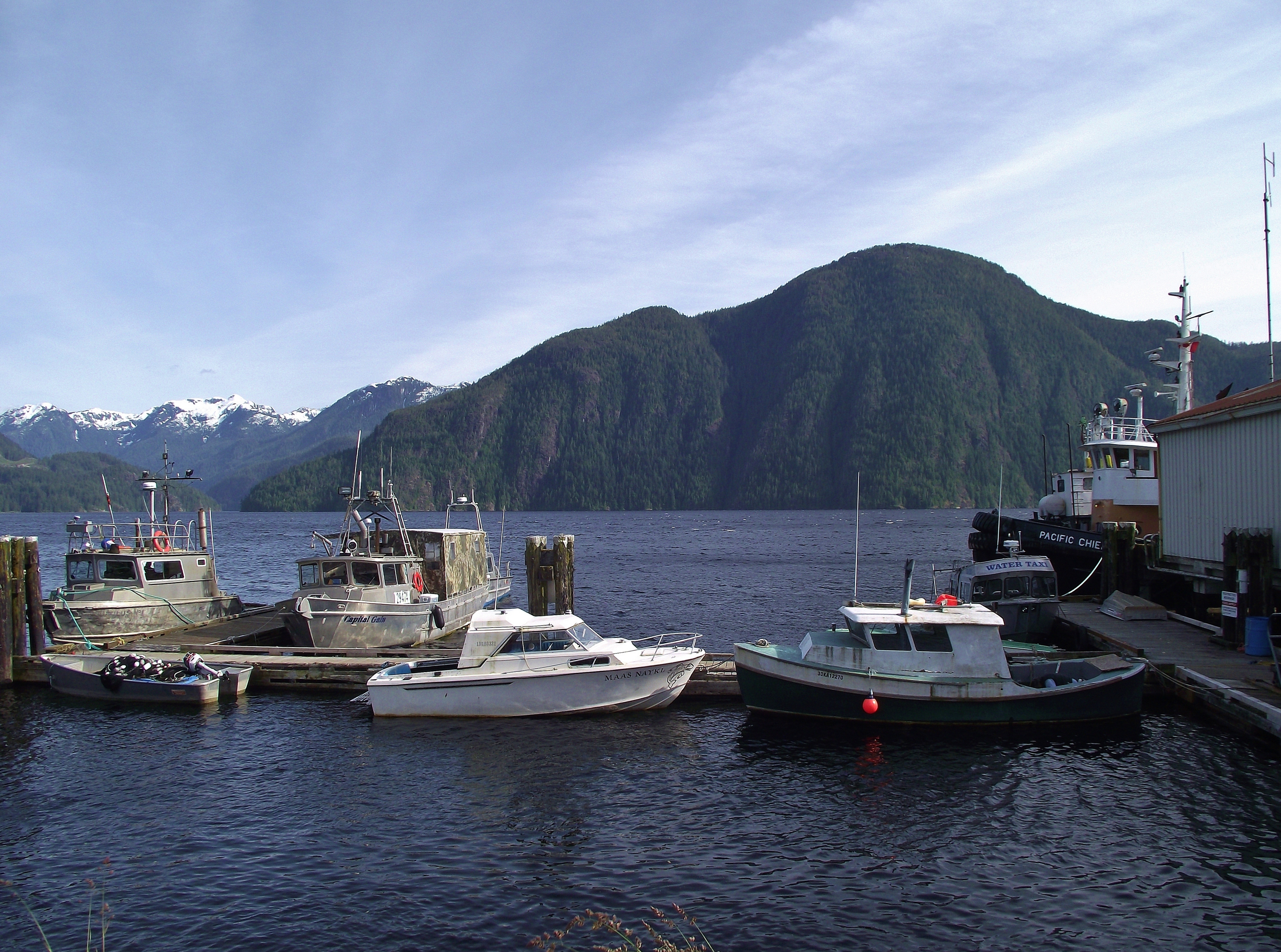
Dock at Muchalat Inlet of Nootka Sound; L98 Luna was killed in the far-western region of the inlet in Mooyah Bay

By May 2004, DFO and Vancouver Aquarium, assisted by the leading NGOs, were initiating Plan A, the boat-follow option. The first step was to train Luna to follow the designated DFO boat, hopefully out of Nootka Sound and into the path of passing Southern Resident orcas. Hopes for the boat-follow rose notably in mid-May 2004 when L98 Luna's family members were sighted off the west side of Vancouver Island, but still some 100 kilometres (62 miles) away from Nootka Sound. The pod never came closer, and by late May, researchers confirmed that the rest of the Southern Resident Community of orcas had in fact taken the route along the east coast of Vancouver Island, eliminating any chance of a natural reunion. By June, DFO began preparations for Plan B, the translocation.

In June, 2004, the translocation operation was initiated with the assistance of the US National Oceanic and Atmospheric Administration. DFO tried to lure Luna into a floating pen in order to move him to southern Vancouver Island where his pod had been observed. The DFO faced efforts by the band to undermine their efforts by blocking their boats with their own. At one point, L98 Luna allowed the team to lead him to the pen opening, but he escaped. That was as close to capture that L98 Luna experienced. Despite the setback, the US and Canadian funds for relocation were still in place (US $200,000), and the L98 Luna team was poised to attempt another rescue in the spring.

== Death ==
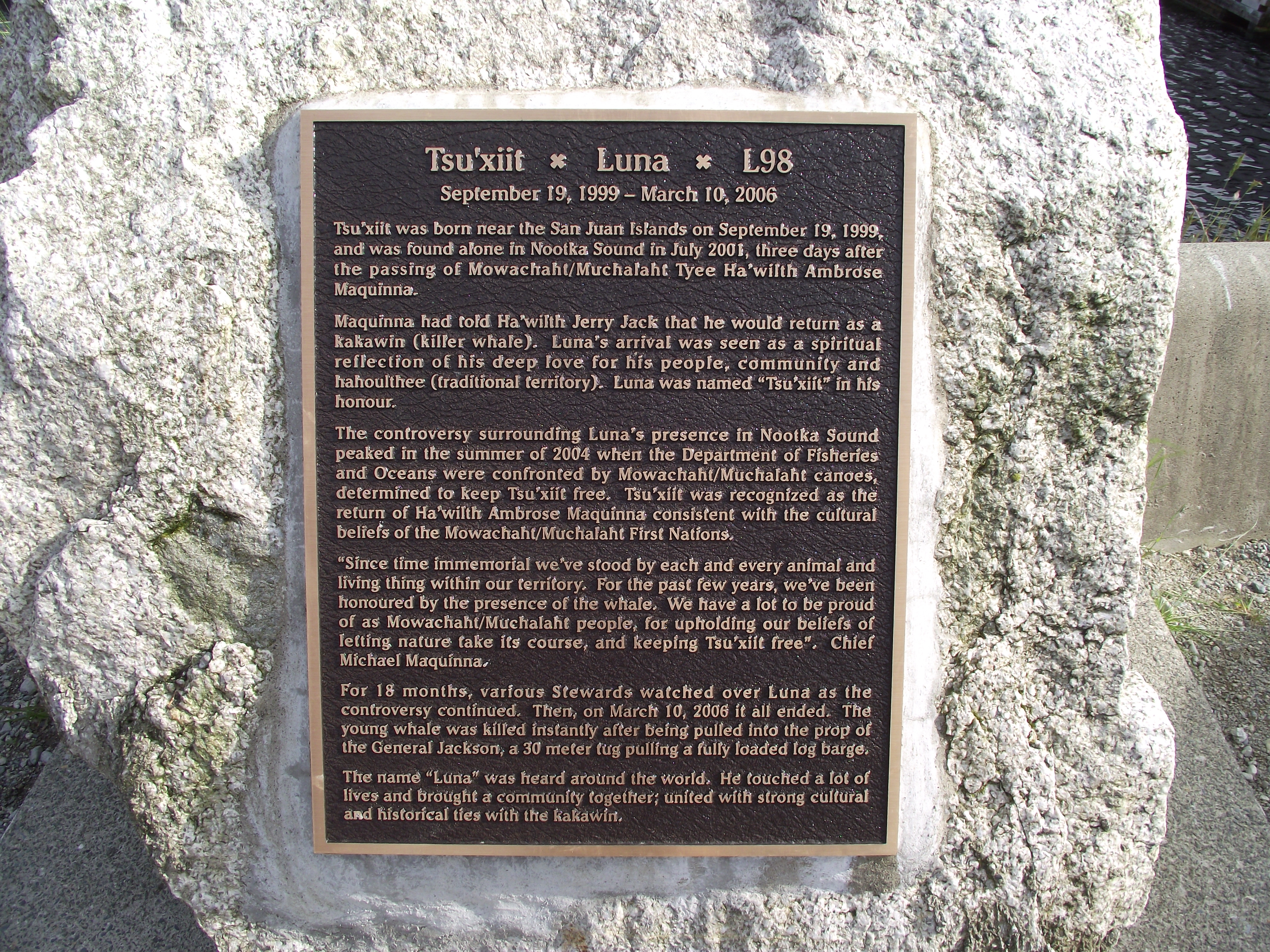
Plaque at Muchalat Inlet, Nootka Sound, commemorating Luna

On March 10, 2006, in Mooyah Bay of Muchalat Inlet, Luna approached a boat he knew—the ocean tugboat, General Jackson—whose crew were interacting with the whale. It is believed that Luna went up to the tugboat intentionally, as he often did, to engage in playful activity. Apparently underestimating the power of the idling vessel—tugboats have much more powerful engines than other ships of their size—Luna was pulled by suction from the propellers into the six-foot diameter blades and killed. Because his body was so damaged from the blades, nothing could be recovered for research.

== Legacy ==
The Gold River Chamber of Commerce published an essay about Luna and a 24-minute documentary video produced and narrated by Suzanne and Mike Chisholm in 2006. In 2007, CTV produced a made-for-television film, Luna: Spirit of the Whale, starring Adam Beach, Jason Priestley, Tantoo Cardinal, and Graham Greene. The film is a fictionalized account of Luna's story, containing some real aspects of his life, and was filmed on location in Nootka Sound and at Gold River. This movie version of Luna's life, however, had a much-different ending, with Luna rejoining his family.

The commercial documentary, Saving Luna, produced by Suzanne Chisholm and Michael Parfit, was introduced at a Seattle film festival in 2008, and played in theaters and television across Canada in 2009. It was broadcast in 2010 on the BBC with the title A Killer Whale Called Luna, and in 2011, with Ryan Reynolds and Scarlett Johansson as executive producers, turned into the theatrical film The Whale. Chisholm's and Parfit's notes were also turned into a book in 2013, The Lost Whale: The True Story of an Orca Named Luna.

The loss of Luna reduced the number of mature males of Southern Resident orcas to just two individuals who have fathered more than half the calves born since 1990.

== See also ==
- List of individual cetaceans

== Additional reading ==
- Francis, Daniel; Hewlett, Gil (2007). Operation Orca: Springer, Luna and the Struggle to Save West Coast Killer Whales. Harbour Publishing. ISBN 978-1-55017-426-7.
- The Luna File, Orca Conservancy, 2019
