= Timber Lake (Jackson County, Minnesota) =

Lake of the United States of America

- Location within Minnesota
- Location: Jackson County, Minnesota
- Coordinates: 43°49′4″N 95°12′51″W
- Type: lake

Timber Lake is a lake in Jackson County, in the U.S. state of Minnesota.

Timber Lake was named for the trees beside the lake on an otherwise relatively barren landscape.

== See also ==
- List of lakes in Minnesota
