= Timber Lake (Lake County, California) =

Lake in the state of California, United States

- Location within California Location within the United States
- Location: Lake County, California
- Coordinates: 39°21′49″N 122°46′37″W
- Surface elevation: 4,872 ft (1,485 m)

Timber Lake is a lake located in Lake County, California. It lies at an elevation of 4,872 feet (1,485 m).

== See also ==
- List of lakes in California
- List of lakes in Lake County, California
