= Timberline Secondary School =

Timberline Secondary

Location
- 1681 S. Dogwood Street; Campbell River, British Columbia, V9W 8C1; Canada; 49.9799°N 125.2450°W

Information
- School type: Public, high school
- Founded: 1997
- School board: School District 72
- Principal: Dr. Jeremy Morrow (2013 - 2017), Laird Ruehlen (2018 - )
- Staff: 50+
- Grades: 9-12
- Enrollment: 738 (September 2009)
- Language: English
- Area: Unknown
- Colours: Red, blue, white, and grey.
- Mascot: Wolf
- Team name: Timberline Wolves
- Website: www.sd72.bc.ca/timberline

Timberline Secondary is a public high school in Campbell River, British Columbia and part of School District 72 Campbell River.

Timberline opened in 1997 to be the second public high school in the city of Campbell River. The school gets its name in part from the fact it was built to blend in with the surrounding forest, which has since been cut down. It shares residence with the Campbell River campus of North Island College.

It has won provincial team championships in boys' soccer and girls' volleyball. Individually, Timberline has had four provincial wrestling champions: Nick Tomniuk (2007), Ashley Osachuk (2012, 2013), Bret Nelson (2014) and BJ Foy (2015, 2016). Osachuk was named the outstanding wrestler at the 2012 provincial wrestling championships. Osachuk and Nelson have both gone on to accept wrestling scholarships at Simon Fraser University (NCAA Division II). Foy has accepted a scholarship to the University of Calgary (CIS). Other outstanding alumni include Riley O'Neill (NCAA Division I - University of Kentucky - Soccer).

The school is the shared home with Carihi Secondary to members of Youth Against Diversity, who were awarded the 2008 British Columbia Nesika Award.
