= Gold River, British Columbia =

Gold River
- Village
- Village of Gold River
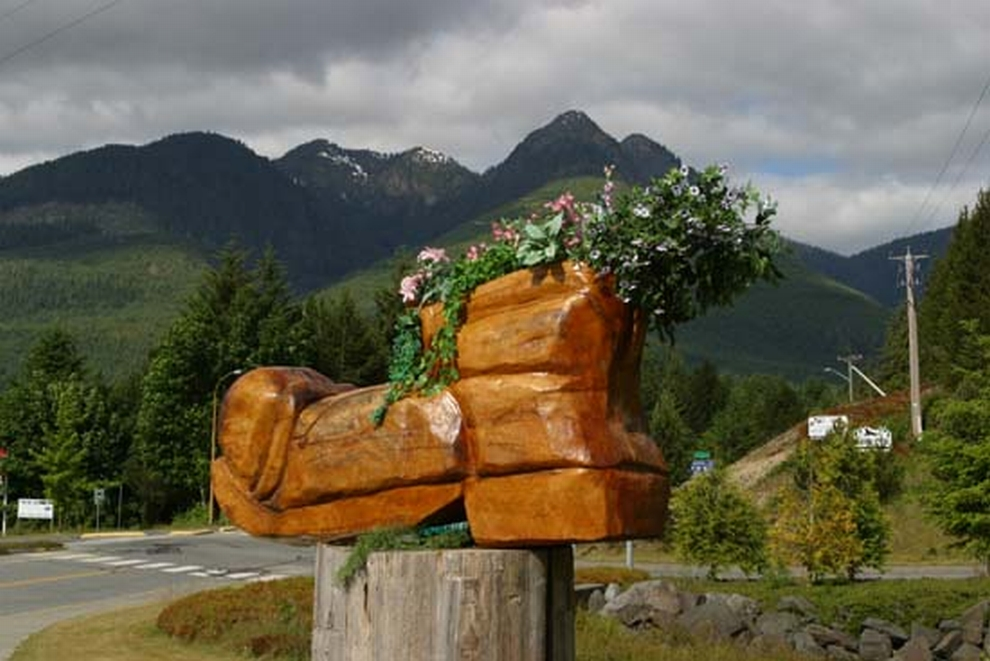
- The Blossoming Boot by Chainsaw Carver Lee Yateman. Made for the Great Walk.

- Location of Gold River in British Columbia Gold River (British Columbia)
- Coordinates: 49°46′37″N 126°3′5″W
- Country: Canada
- Province: British Columbia
- Region: Vancouver Island
- Regional district: Strathcona
- Incorporated: 1965

Government
  - Mayor: Peter Wehmeier
  - Governing body: Gold River Village Council

Area
  - Total: 10.78 km^{2} (4.16 sq mi)
- Elevation: 160 m (520 ft)

Population (2019)
  - Total: 1,500~
  - Density: 15/km^{2} (39/sq mi)
- Time zone: UTC−07:00 (PT)
- Postal code: V0P 1G0
- Highways: 28
- Climate: Cfb
- Website: goldriver.ca

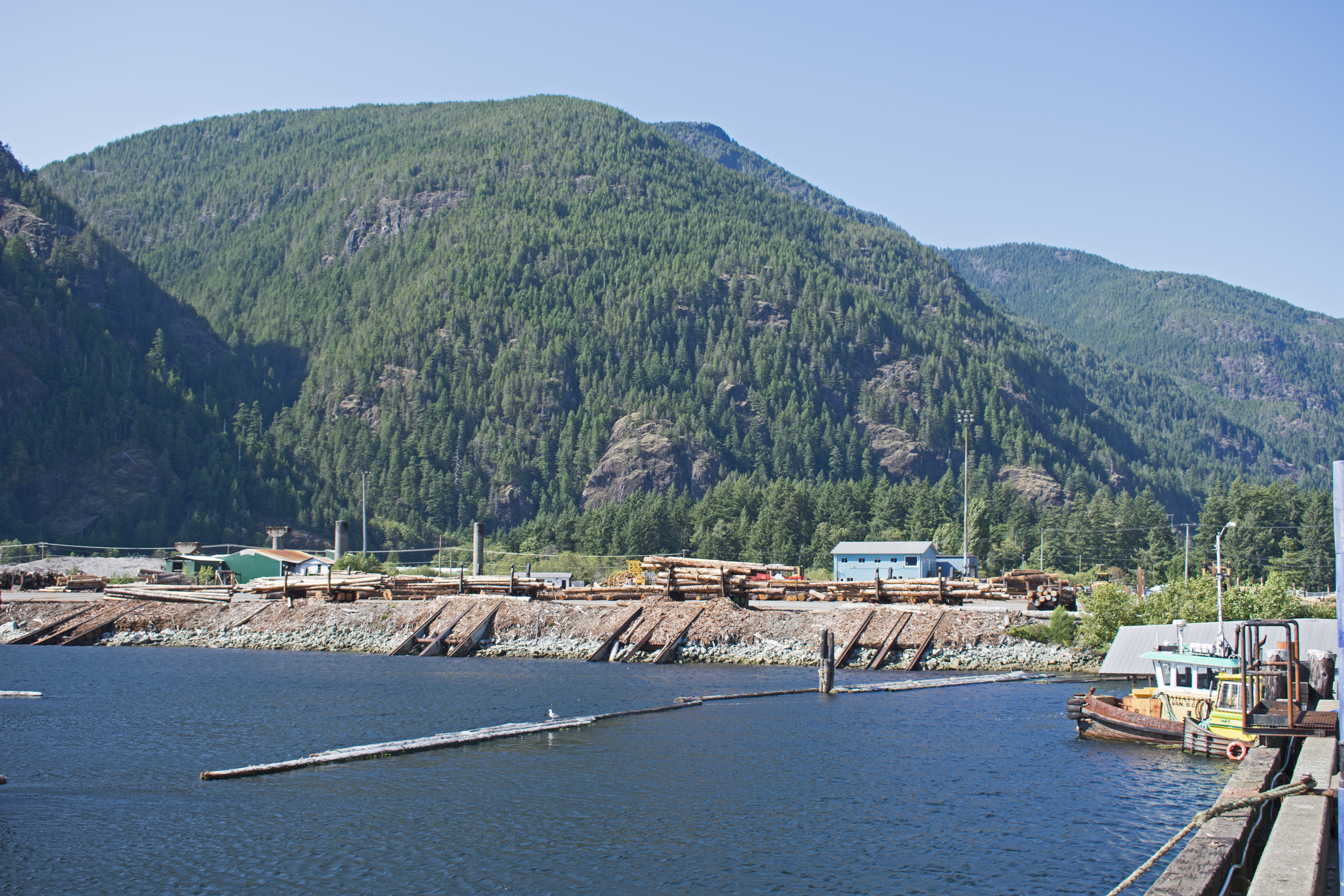
Timber floating in the part of Gold River on Muchalat Inlet

Gold River is a village municipality located close to the geographic centre of Vancouver Island in British Columbia, Canada. In terms of the Island's human geography it is considered to be part of the "North Island", even though it technically is on the Island's west coast.

== History ==
Gold River was established in 1965 as Canada's first all-electric town with underground wiring, and it quickly grew around the logging and pulp and paper industry community. Following the mill closure in 1999, the village transitioned towards a tourism-based economy, capitalizing on its natural surroundings of stunning mountains, lakes, rivers, and ocean.

Currently, Gold River serves as a base for such famous activities as the Nootka Island trek, hiking the Elk Lake trail and mountain climbing Golden Hinde (Vancouver Island's highest peak), Crest Creek climbing crags, MV Uchuck III, and the Great Walk.

Gold River also serves as a historic point, being the closest village to the famous Yuquot, or "Friendly Cove", where British explorer Captain James Cook first set ashore. There Cook met the Mowachaht native band's chief, Chief Maquinna.

== Demographics ==
In the 2021 Census of Population conducted by Statistics Canada, Gold River had a population of 1,246 living in 610 of its 692 total private dwellings, a change of 2.8% from its 2016 population of 1,212. With a land area of 10.92 km^{2} (4.22 sq mi), it had a population density of 114.1/km^{2} (295.5/sq mi) in 2021.

== Luna, the orca ==
In 2001, a two-year-old male orca, later named Luna, was seen in Nootka Sound alone as far inland as the marina at Gold River. Presumed to be an orphan separated from his pod, Luna became a local and international celebrity by his playful and curious behavior with lumber tugboats and recreational watercraft on Nootka Sound, and with people, including young children, on the Gold River dock. The popularity of Luna made Gold River an international attraction from early 2002 through March 2006 when Luna was killed in an accidental collision with a tugboat propeller.

== Climate ==
Gold River has a Marine west coast climate (Köppen climate classification Cfb). With warm dry summers and mild rainy winters, during the winter constant Low Pressure Systems moving off of the Pacific Ocean causes winter to be the wettest season. Most precipitation falls as rain year round but snow is not uncommon in the winter months averaging 118 cm (46.5 in) but does not usually stay long. Summers are warm with an average summer temperate of 17.6 °C (63.7 °F) in July, although afternoon shade temperatures exceeding 30 °C (86.0 °F) are not uncommon in summer. This is due to the community being located inland surrounded by mountains, causing Adiabatic heating to occur giving Gold River its own microclimate. The summer months are also the driest of the year with only 55.4 mm (2.2 in) of rain in July compared to 481.9 mm (19.0 in) in November. The average rainfall all year is 2,846.7 mm (112.1 in) making the west coast of Vancouver Island the wettest place in Canada.

The record high recorded for the village was 41.5 °C (106.7 °F) recorded on July 28, 2009. That record high, however, was eclipsed during the 2021 Western North America heat wave. A weather station at Ray Watkins Elementary school recorded a new record high of 42.1 °C (107.8 °F) on June 27, which was again eclipsed the next day when the temperature reached 43.7 °C (110.7 °F) on June 28 which is the current record as it stands for the village. Gold River also currently holds the hottest known temperature on the island for the month of August when the same station at Ray Watkins recorded a temperature of 40.8 °C (105.4 °F) on August 12 that same year. The record low was −19 °C (−2.2 °F) recorded on January 28, 1980.

Climate data for Gold River (1981–2010 normals)
Month	Jan	Feb	Mar	Apr	May	Jun	Jul	Aug	Sep	Oct	Nov	Dec	Year
Record high °C (°F)	16.0 (60.8)	19.0 (66.2)	24.0 (75.2)	31.5 (88.7)	37.0 (98.6)	43.7 (110.7)	41.5 (106.7)	40.8 (105.4)	37.0 (98.6)	27.0 (80.6)	17.0 (62.6)	12.8 (55.0)	41.5 (106.7)
Mean daily maximum °C (°F)	4.7 (40.5)	7.2 (45.0)	10.4 (50.7)	14.2 (57.6)	18.3 (64.9)	21.3 (70.3)	24.9 (76.8)	25.4 (77.7)	21.8 (71.2)	13.8 (56.8)	7.1 (44.8)	3.9 (39.0)	14.4 (57.9)
Daily mean °C (°F)	2.1 (35.8)	3.3 (37.9)	5.6 (42.1)	8.5 (47.3)	12.1 (53.8)	15.1 (59.2)	17.9 (64.2)	18.1 (64.6)	14.8 (58.6)	9.4 (48.9)	4.4 (39.9)	1.6 (34.9)	9.4 (48.9)
Mean daily minimum °C (°F)	−0.6 (30.9)	−0.7 (30.7)	0.8 (33.4)	2.7 (36.9)	5.9 (42.6)	8.9 (48.0)	10.9 (51.6)	10.8 (51.4)	7.8 (46.0)	4.9 (40.8)	1.7 (35.1)	−0.7 (30.7)	4.4 (39.9)
Record low °C (°F)	−19.0 (−2.2)	−14.0 (6.8)	−11.0 (12.2)	−5.0 (23.0)	−2.0 (28.4)	1.0 (33.8)	2.5 (36.5)	4.0 (39.2)	−2.0 (28.4)	−8.0 (17.6)	−17.0 (1.4)	−17.0 (1.4)	−19.0 (−2.2)
Average precipitation mm (inches)	424.1 (16.70)	286.4 (11.28)	266.3 (10.48)	186.6 (7.35)	120.2 (4.73)	90.9 (3.58)	55.5 (2.19)	71.1 (2.80)	109.2 (4.30)	358.8 (14.13)	490.9 (19.33)	391.0 (15.39)	2,851.1 (112.25)
Average snowfall cm (inches)	27.2 (10.7)	28.4 (11.2)	10.0 (3.9)	1.5 (0.6)	0.0 (0.0)	0.0 (0.0)	0.0 (0.0)	0.0 (0.0)	0.0 (0.0)	1.0 (0.4)	8.2 (3.2)	28.3 (11.1)	104.6 (41.2)
Source: Environment Canada
