= List of shipwrecks in 1926 =

The list of shipwrecks in 1926 includes ships sunk, foundered, grounded, or otherwise lost during 1926.

table of contents
1926
Jan	Feb	Mar	Apr
May	Jun	Jul	Aug
Sep	Oct	Nov	Dec
Unknown date

== January ==
=== 1 January ===
List of shipwrecks: 1 January 1926
Ship	State	Description
Myrtle Piercy	United Kingdom	The three-masted schooner was abandoned in the Atlantic Ocean (47°13′N 35°54′W). Her crew were rescued by Beemsterdijk (Netherlands).

=== 2 January ===
List of shipwrecks: 2 January 1926
Ship	State	Description
Juno	Finland	The cargo ship ran aground at Kökarsörn and sank. Her crew were rescued.
Lady Macullum	United Kingdom	The cargo ship ran aground at Poolavl Point, 5 nautical miles (9.3 km) north of Kalkudah, Ceylon and sank with some loss of life.
Maralie	United Kingdom	The cargo ship ran aground in the River Fal at Falmouth, Cornwall. She was refloated on 5 January.

=== 4 January ===
List of shipwrecks: 4 January 1926
Ship	State	Description
Cecile	France	The schooner foundered in the Bay of Biscay. Her crew were rescued by Capri (United Kingdom).

=== 5 January ===
List of shipwrecks: 5 January 1926
Ship	State	Description
Omega	France	The schooner came ashore off the La Coubre Lighthouse, Charente-Maritime. Five of her nine crew were landed. She broke in two the next day and was a total loss. The remainder of her crew were rescued.

=== 6 January ===
List of shipwrecks: 6 January 1926
Ship	State	Description
Ardgarroch	United Kingdom	The cargo ship ran aground at Villerville, Calvados, France. She was refloated on 10 January.

=== 7 January ===
List of shipwrecks: 7 January 1926
Ship	State	Description
Audace	Italy	The cargo ship collided with Petka (Yugoslavia) at Dubrovnik, Yugoslavia and sank.

=== 8 January ===
List of shipwrecks: 8 January 1926
Ship	State	Description
Manuela Pla	Spain	The coaster capsized at Mobile, Alabama, United States.
Ormond	United States	The barge, towed by Goliath (United States), broke loose between Norfolk, Virginia and New York City, she anchored, but sank. Lost with all four hands.
T. J. Hooper	United States	The barge, towed by Goliath (United States), broke loose between Norfolk, Virginia and New York city, she anchored, but sank. Lost with all four hands.

=== 9 January ===
List of shipwrecks: 9 January 1926
Ship	State	Description
Prins Valdemar	United States	The ship ran aground in the Miami Shipping Channel off Miami, Florida, capsized and sank partially submerged, blocking the channel. Refloated 42 days later, hauled ashore for use as a building. Scrapped in 1952.

=== 10 January ===
List of shipwrecks: 10 January 1926
Ship	State	Description
Emperor	United Kingdom	The 93.6-foot (28.5 m) steam trawler was sunk in a collision with trawler "Ocean Prince" (United Kingdom) northeast of Aberdeen.

=== 11 January ===
List of shipwrecks: 11 January 1926
Ship	State	Description
Tung Shing	United Kingdom	The coaster was rammed and sunk by Empress of Asia (United Kingdom) in the Yangtze at Shanghai, China with the loss of between five and ten lives.

=== 12 January ===
List of shipwrecks: 12 January 1926
Ship	State	Description
Cormoran	United Kingdom	The 120.8-foot (36.8 m) steam trawler stranded in Kilchiaran Bay, Rinns of Islay. Most of the rest of the crew made it to shore, part of the crew abandoned ship in her boat and were picked up by steamer "Cygnet" 4 days later. Her skipper died in unclear circumstances
John Gibson	United Kingdom	The schooner was in collision with Empress (France) in the English Channel off Dover, Kent and sank. All four crew were rescued by Empress.
Nesta	United Kingdom	The Thames barge collided with Jolly Charles (United Kingdom) in the River Medway at Cliffe, Kent and sank.

=== 13 January ===
List of shipwrecks: 13 January 1926
Ship	State	Description
Valdura	United Kingdom	The cargo ship ran aground in Ballyteighe Bay. She was still aground on 28 January. She was refloated on 13 March.
Volga	Italy	The tanker caught fire in the Persian Gulf off Oman. Her crew were rescued on 19 January by British Rose (United Kingdom).

=== 15 January ===
List of shipwrecks: 15 January 1926
Ship	State	Description
King #1	United States	A gasoline vapor explosion that occurred while her crew was lighting her stove destroyed the 8-gross register ton motor vessel while she was at anchor in Green Island, Uganik Bay (60°15′00″N 147°28′30″W) in Southeast Alaska. Her crew of two survived and escaped in a dory.

=== 16 January ===
List of shipwrecks: 16 January 1926
Ship	State	Description
Pere Marquette	United States	The train ferry ran aground at Manitowoc, Wisconsin. She was refloated in late December.
Rosabelle	United Kingdom	The cargo ship collided with Lady Longford (United Kingdom) in the River Mersey and was beached. She was refloated on 18 January.

=== 17 January ===
List of shipwrecks: 17 January 1926
Ship	State	Description
Clovelly	United Kingdom	The cargo ship ran aground at Ortigueira, Galicia, Spain. She was declared a total loss on 27 January.
Daishin Maru No.3	Japan	The cargo ship departed from Yokohama for Muroran, Hokkaidō. Although presumed foundered off Yamata, Iwatw with the loss of all hands, she was discovered on 18 February drifting at (33°44′N 155°26′E) by Java Arrow (United Kingdom) and her 14 crew were taken off.

=== 18 January ===
List of shipwrecks: 18 January 1926
Ship	State	Description
Cormoran	United Kingdom	The 120.7-foot (36.8 m), 231-ton steam trawler was wrecked on rocks on the south side of the entrance to Kilchiaran Bay (55°44′N 06°28′W). Her captain was killed when her boiler exploded. Five crew made it to shore. Five other crew had a three-day ordeal before making it to shore in her boat.
Onda	Greece	The cargo ship ran aground at Epanomi Point. She was refloated on 23 January.

=== 19 January ===
List of shipwrecks: 19 January 1926
Ship	State	Description
Heinrich Schuldt	Germany	The cargo ship ran aground in Holbek Fjord. She was refloated on 23 January.
Palma	United Kingdom	The cargo ship ran aground in the Bonny River, Nigeria. She was refloated on 27 January.

=== 20 January ===
List of shipwrecks: 20 January 1926
Ship	State	Description
Maria	Chile	The four-masted barque sprang a leak off Chañaral and was abandoned by her crew. She came ashore and was a total loss.
W.B.	United Kingdom	The Thames barge was struck by Weser (Germany) in the River Thames at Blackwall, London and sank.

=== 23 January ===
List of shipwrecks: 23 January 1926
Ship	State	Description
Principessa Jolanda	Italy	The cargo ship ran aground at Cape Kaliakra, Bulgaria. She was declared a constructive total loss.

=== 25 January ===
List of shipwrecks: 25 January 1926
Ship	State	Description
Antinoë	United Kingdom	The cargo ship issued an SOS in the Atlantic Ocean (46°10′N 39°58′W). She was abandoned on 28 January (47°50′N 36°00′W). Her crew were rescued by President Roosevelt (United States).
Aspasia Despousi	Greece	The cargo ship ran aground at Cuxhaven, Germany. She was refloated on 1 February.
Maridal	Norway	The cargo ship was beached on Possession Island, South-West Africa having struck the Angra Reef on 11 January.
Risøy	Norway	The cargo ship was abandoned in the North Sea off Jæren, Norway. Her crew were rescued by Kongshavn (Norway).
Solvang	Norway	The cargo ship collided with Vacuum (United States) in the Atlantic Ocean off the Winter Quarter Lighthouse, Delaware and sank.

=== 26 January ===
List of shipwrecks: 26 January 1926
Ship	State	Description
Buckeye	United States	While anchored in Whiskey Cove (55°19′40″N 131°37′45″W) on the north coast of Pennock Island in the Alexander Archipelago in Southeast Alaska, the 15-gross register ton motor vessel suffered an explosion which set her on fire. After the fire went out of control, she was scuttled to extinguish it. The only person aboard survived.
Vassilos Destounis	Greece	The cargo ship ran aground in the Danube downstream of Galaţi, Romania. She was refloated on 1 February.

=== 27 January ===
List of shipwrecks: 27 January 1926
Ship	State	Description
Filia E. Tricoglu	Greece	The cargo ship ran aground on Siphanto. She was abandoned as a total loss.
Laristan	United Kingdom	The cargo ship foundered in the Atlantic Ocean (45°12′N 43°12′W) with the loss of 24 of her 30 crew. Survivors were rescued by Bremen (Germany).

=== 28 January ===
List of shipwrecks: 28 January 1926
Ship	State	Description
Gertrud	Netherlands	The schooner, which had departed St. John's, Newfoundland on 25 January for Porto, Portugal, was reported on this date in the Atlantic Ocean (47°37′N 35°14′W). No further trace, presumed foundered with the loss of all hands.
Spencer Lake	United Kingdom	The schooner was dismasted and abandoned in the Atlantic Ocean (36°37′N 41°00′W). Her crew were rescued by Ogontz (United States).

=== 29 January ===
List of shipwrecks: 29 January 1926
Ship	State	Description
Eleftheris M. Tricoglu	Greece	The cargo ship ran aground off Arranmore, County Donegal, Ireland. She was declared a total loss on 10 February.
Gordon T. Tibbo	United Kingdom	The schooner was abandoned in the Atlantic Ocean off the coast of the United States. Her crew were rescued.

=== 30 January ===
List of shipwrecks: 30 January 1926
Ship	State	Description
Johanne Dybwad	Norway	The cargo ship issued an SOS in the Atlantic Ocean (45°50′N 37°20′W). All 25 crew were taken off the ship on 3 February by Arminco (Belgium). The ship was left drifting, and was discovered at 46°10′N 30°05′W on 21 February by West Ira (United States), which took her in tow . She arrived at Falmouth, Cornwall on 28 February.

=== Unknown date ===
List of shipwrecks: Unknown January 1926
Ship	State	Description
Bronx No. 1	United States	The barge, towed by W. F. Mattich (United States), sank in a storm 3 or 4 miles (4.8 or 6.4 km) south east of Frying Pan Shoals Lightship between 26 and 29 January. Four lives lost between the two barges.
Severan	United States	The barge, towed by W. F. Mattich (United States), sank in a storm 3 or 4 miles (4.8 or 6.4 km) south east of Frying Pan Shoals Lightship between 26 and 29 January. Four lives lost between the two barges.

== February ==
=== 1 February ===
List of shipwrecks: 1 February 1926
Ship	State	Description
Searsport	United States	The barge, towed by Battleboto (United States), broke loose from her tow in a gale and snowstorm off Barnegat, New Jersey and was never seen again. Lost with all four hands.
Yankee II	United States	The 38-gross register ton, 83-foot (25 m) vessel sank at Cordova, Territory of Alaska. Her two crewmen survived.

=== 2 February ===
List of shipwrecks: 2 February 1926
Ship	State	Description
Crater	United Kingdom	The 99.2-foot (30.2 m) steam trawler struck a submerged object, probably a wreck, and sank 6.5 miles east of Souter Lighthouse. Crew rescued from her boat by drifter "Seaton Castle" (United Kingdom).
Porthcawl	United Kingdom	The cargo ship ran aground off West Inchcolm in the Firth of Forth. She was refloated on 23 February and beached at Leith, Lothian.

=== 3 February ===
List of shipwrecks: 3 February 1926
Ship	State	Description
Amerika	Germany	The cargo ship ran aground on the west coast of Gotland, Sweden. She was refloated on 6 February.
Maitland	Sweden	The cargo ship was in collision with Bazalgette (United Kingdom) in the River Thames and sank. All 20 people aboard survived. The wreck was subsequently struck by Brockley, Corness (both United Kingdom) and Marcato (Sweden). The Marcato also sank. All 21 people aboard were rescued by Southampton (United Kingdom).
Tolosa	United Kingdom	The cargo ship ran aground in the Saloum River, French West Africa. She was refloated on 6 February.
Unidentified barges	United States	Three barges, towed by Georges Creek (United States), sank in a storm north east of Brigantine, New Jersey. Seven crewmen killed, two rescued by the United States Coast Guard.
Whimbrel	United Kingdom	The cargo ship collided with Marloch (United Kingdom) in the Scheldt off Vlissingen, Netherlands and sank.

=== 4 February ===
List of shipwrecks: 4 February 1926
Ship	State	Description
Burma	Italy	The cargo ship ran aground on Tree Island, China. She was refloated on 7 February.
City of Agra	United Kingdom	The cargo ship ran aground at Cochin, India. She was refloated on 15 February.
Kenwood	United States	Carrying a cargo of lumber, the 184-foot (56 m), 929-gross register ton four-masted schooner was blown onto rocks during a gale just offshore on the north side of Cedar Point at Scituate, Massachusetts. Her wreck settled in 10 feet (3.0 m) of water.

=== 5 February ===
List of shipwrecks: 5 February 1926
Ship	State	Description
Amsterdam	Sweden	The cargo ship ran aground at Paskallavik. She was refloated on 10 February.

=== 6 February ===
List of shipwrecks: 6 February 1926
Ship	State	Description
Avarca	United Kingdom	The auxiliary sailing vessel was destroyed by fire in Davao Gulf.
Jean Dupuis	France	The cargo ship ran aground in the Maskali Islands, French Somaliland. She was still aground on 11 February.
Retraction	United Kingdom	The schooner was abandoned in the Atlantic Ocean in a sinking condition. She was set afire by her crew, who were rescued by El Oso (United Kingdom).
Wellington	United States	The tug collided with Ardmore (United States) in the Atlantic Ocean off New Jersey and sank.

=== 7 February ===
List of shipwrecks: 7 February 1926
Ship	State	Description
Ooma	United Kingdom	The cargo ship ran aground on Ocean Island.

=== 8 February ===
List of shipwrecks: 8 February 1926
Ship	State	Description
Muguet	France	The schooner was abandoned in the Atlantic Ocean (36°15′N 36°36′W). She was set afire and her crew were rescued by West Harcuvar (United States).
Yosemite	United States	The schooner ran aground at Point Reyes, California. Her crew were rescued by Willamette (United States). Yosemite was taken in tow by Sea Ranger (United States) but was wrecked when part of her cargo of dynamite exploded.

=== 9 February ===
List of shipwrecks: 9 February 1926
Ship	State	Description
Altai Mendi	Spain	The cargo ship ran aground at Hong Kong. She was refloated on 11 March.
Munin	Sweden	The cargo ship ran aground at Brogsbredan. She broke in two about a month later and was a total loss.
Pinto	United Kingdom	The cargo ship foundered 115 nautical miles (213 km) west by north of "Lindnaze". Her crew were rescued by Casper (United States).

=== 10 February ===
List of shipwrecks: 10 February 1926
Ship	State	Description
Cuttie Sark	United Kingdom	The Thames barge collided with Foam Queen (United Kingdom) in the River Thames at Deptford, London, and sank.
Emperor	United Kingdom	The 93.5-foot (28.5 m), 130-ton steam trawler was sunk when struck by the trawler Ocean Prince (United Kingdom) 10 miles (16 km) northeast of Aberdeen, Scotland. The crew were rescued by Ocean Prince.
Imica	Norway	The cargo ship foundered in the North Sea. Her crew were rescued by the trawler Irene Wray (United Kingdom).

=== 11 February ===
List of shipwrecks: 11 February 1926
Ship	State	Description
Harald Caspar	United Kingdom	The cargo ship ran aground off Sable Island, Nova Scotia, Canada and was a total loss.
Heian Maru	Japan	The cargo ship was wrecked at Cape Soyedomani, Hokkaidō.
Ignazio	Italy	The cargo ship ran aground at Alexandria, Egypt. She was refloated on 1 March.

=== 12 February ===
List of shipwrecks: 12 February 1926
Ship	State	Description
Moneyspinner	United Kingdom	The coaster ran aground at Porto, Portugal and was abandoned by her crew. She was declared a total loss on 16 February.

=== 13 February ===
List of shipwrecks: 13 February 1926
Ship	State	Description
Antwerp	United Kingdom	The passenger ferry collided with Darlington (United Kingdom) in the North Sea off Terneuzen, Netherlands. Both vessels were beached. All passengers were taken off Antwerp by other ships.
Député Henri Durré	France	The cargo ship collided with Poseidon (Germany) in the Scheldt at Antwerp, Belgium and sank. The wreck was cleared in January 2013.
Marie Thereze	Danzig	The cargo ship was rammed and sunk in the North Sea by British Earl (United Kingdom) off the Cross Sands Lightship (United Kingdom). All 23 crew were rescued by British Earl.
Sumo Maru	Japan	The passenger ship ran aground at Good Hope Cape, near Swatow, China. Her passengers and mails were taken off by Taikwa Maru (Japan).

=== 14 February ===
List of shipwrecks: 14 February 1926
Ship	State	Description
Strauss	Germany	The cargo ship ran aground on Nygrund, Estonia. She was refloated on 27 April.

=== 15 February ===
List of shipwrecks: 15 February 1926
Ship	State	Description
Cirilo Amoros	Spain	The cargo ship ran aground at Ballyvooney Cove, County Waterford, Ireland and was abandoned.
Jane	United Kingdom	The coaster ran aground at Port Logan, Wigtownshire. She was refloated on 14 March.
Libertà	Italy	The cargo ship ran aground off Bolt Head, Devon, United Kingdom and was abandoned.

=== 16 February ===
List of shipwrecks: 16 February 1926
Ship	State	Description
Useful	United Kingdom	The schooner was driven ashore near the Southerness Lighthouse, Dumfriesshire and was wrecked with the loss of a crew member.

=== 17 February ===
List of shipwrecks: 17 February 1926
Ship	State	Description
Edith	United Kingdom	The cargo ship ran aground at Westkapelle, Netherlands. She was refloated on 25 February.
Marita	Netherlands	The cargo ship ran aground in the River Avon, Somerset, United Kingdom. She was refloated on 14 March.
Naparima	(Trinidad and Tobago) Trinidad	The passenger ship was rammed and sunk by Vandyck (United Kingdom) with the loss of twelve lives.

=== 19 February ===
List of shipwrecks: 19 February 1926
Ship	State	Description
Boeton	Netherlands	The cargo ship caught fire at Brest, Finistère, France and was beached. She was refloated on 26 February.
Pearl	United Kingdom	The coaster ran aground in the Ture River, County Donegal, Ireland. She was refloated on 24 February.
Prospera	Brazil	The cargo ship caught fire at Rio de Janeiro and was beached.
Westerham	United Kingdom	The cargo ship ran aground at Saint-Valery-sur-Somme, Somme France. She was refloated on 24 February.

=== 20 February ===
List of shipwrecks: 20 February 1926
Ship	State	Description
Varanger	Norway	The tanker ran aground in the Paraná River at Point Indio, Argentina. She was refloated on 25 February.

=== 21 February ===
List of shipwrecks: 21 February 1926
Ship	State	Description
Maron	Germany	The cargo ship ran aground at Falsterbo, Sweden. She was refloated on 1 June.
"Perian Empire"	United Kingdom	The steam trawler was in Luce Bay, Wigtownshire.

=== 24 February ===
List of shipwrecks: 24 February 1926
Ship	State	Description
Touraine	Norway	The cargo ship ran aground at Brisbane, Queensland, Australia. She was refloated on 3 March.

=== 26 February ===
List of shipwrecks: 26 February 1926
Ship	State	Description
General Belgrano	Germany	The cargo ship collided with Burutu (United Kingdom) at Hamburg and was beached.
Sheaf Don	United Kingdom	The cargo ship came ashore at Langesund, Norway. She subsequently sank and was a total loss.

=== 27 February ===
List of shipwrecks: 27 February 1926
Ship	State	Description
HMML 287	Royal Navy	The motor launch foundered in the English Channel. Her crew were rescued by HMS Turquoise (Royal Navy).

=== 28 February ===
List of shipwrecks: 28 February 1926
Ship	State	Description
Karu	United Kingdom	The coaster sprang a leak and foundered in the Pacific Ocean off Cape Maria van Diemen, North Island, New Zealand with some loss of life.

== March ==
=== 2 March ===
List of shipwrecks: 2 March 1926
Ship	State	Description
Elly	United Kingdom	The auxiliary sailing vessel was wrecked at Golden Bay, Newfoundland. Her crew survived.

=== 3 March ===
List of shipwrecks: 3 March 1926
Ship	State	Description
Arabia	Germany	The cargo ship foundered in the Irish Sea with the loss of all 19 crew.
Harry Herbert	United Kingdom	The schooner was wrecked on the Lynch Bank, in the Bristol Channel. Her crew survived.

=== 4 March ===
List of shipwrecks: 4 March 1926
Ship	State	Description
Nugget	United Kingdom	The steam coaster suffered engine failure leaving Ayr for Dublin with coal in a gale; without power or steering, blown ashore on St Nicholas Rocks, south of Ayr; the crew were rescued by ship's boat and lifeboat. Refloated on 14 March, but sank again due to a large hole under the boiler; on 15 March she was patched, refloated again and taken into Ayr for discharge. She was declared a constructive total loss and broken up in April.

=== 5 March ===
List of shipwrecks: 5 March 1926
Ship	State	Description
Daina	Latvia	The three-masted schooner was driven ashore at Zeebrugge, West Flanders, Belgium and was wrecked with the loss of one of her six crew.
Horaisan Maru	Japan	The cargo ship ran aground at Aberdeen, Washington, United States and was wrecked. Her crew were rescued.

=== 6 March ===
List of shipwrecks: 6 March 1926
Ship	State	Description
Hillcrest	United Kingdom	The sailing ship foundered off Red Island, Dominion of Newfoundland, with the loss of a crew member.
Klar	Norway	The tug collided with Venus (Norway) at Karmsundet, Norway, and sank with the loss of three crew.
Neo Hebridais	France	The cargo ship was struck by Refrigerant (France) at Alexandria, Egypt and was beached.
W. C. Kennedy	United Kingdom	The schooner was driven ashore on the North Reef, Grand Turk Island and was wrecked. Her crew survived.

=== 7 March ===
List of shipwrecks: 7 March 1926
Ship	State	Description
Chojun Maru	Japan	The cargo ship collided with Nichinan Maru (Japan) at Shimonoseki and was beached. She was refloated on 17 March.

=== 10 March ===
List of shipwrecks: 10 March 1926
Ship	State	Description
America	United States	The ocean liner was severely damaged by fire at Newport News, Virginia. She was subsequently repaired and returned to service.
Camellia	United Kingdom	The Thames barge collided with Sapper (United Kingdom) in the River Thames at Charlton, London and sank.
Chi Yung	China	The ship was destroyed by fire in the Yantze.
Grado	Norway	The cargo ship ran aground at Lemvig, Denmark. She was refloated on 16 March.

=== 11 March ===
List of shipwrecks: 11 March 1926
Ship	State	Description
Sirena	Italy	The cargo ship ran aground at Hook of Holland, Netherlands and was abandoned as a total loss.
Skra	Greece	The cargo ship ran aground at Aigio.

=== 12 March ===
List of shipwrecks: 12 March 1926
Ship	State	Description
Alleanza	Italy	The cargo ship ran aground at the Ras el-Tin Palace, Alexandria, Egypt. She was refloated on 15 March.

=== 13 March ===
List of shipwrecks: 13 March 1926
Ship	State	Description
Bragi	Germany	The cargo ship ran aground at Rattray Head, Aberdeenshire, United Kingdom. She was refloated on 27 March.
Maria Altieri	Italy	The barquentine was abandoned in the Mediterranean Sea (35°25′N 17°37′E). All eight crew were rescued by Ningchow (United Kingdom).
Suduffco	United States	The cargo ship departed Newark, New Jersey for San Francisco, California. No further trace, presumed foundered with the loss of all hands.

=== 14 March ===
List of shipwrecks: 14 March 1926
Ship	State	Description
Eastern City	United Kingdom	The cargo ship ran aground at Nuevitas, Cuba. She was refloated on 20 March.

=== 16 March ===
List of shipwrecks: 16 March 1926
Ship	State	Description
Cavalaire	France	The cargo ship came ashore at Point Blevee, Saint Marie Island, Madagascar and was abandoned.

=== 17 March ===
List of shipwrecks: 17 March 1926
Ship	State	Description
Fagerness		The steamer sank off Trevose Head, Cornwall after she was run down by steamer Cornish Coast.
Paparoa	United Kingdom	The cargo ship caught fire in the Indian Ocean (29°38′S 14°25′E). She was abandoned at 28°26′S 13°42′E and subsequently sank.

=== 18 March ===
List of shipwrecks: 18 March 1926
Ship	State	Description
Fagernes	Italy	The cargo ship collided with Cornish Coast (United Kingdom) in the Bristol Channel off the Scarweather Lightship (United Kingdom) and sank.

=== 22 March ===
List of shipwrecks: 22 March 1926
Ship	State	Description
Cecil Junior	Newfoundland	The schooner foundered in the Atlantic Ocean. Her crew were rescued by RFA War Diwan (Royal Navy).
Paes de Carvalho	Brazil	The passenger ship caught fire and sank in the Amazon River at Coury with the loss of 104 of the 189 people aboard.

=== 23 March ===
List of shipwrecks: 23 March 1926
Ship	State	Description
Salmonby	United Kingdom	The 138.8-foot (42.3 m), 317-ton steam trawler, a sold off Mersey-class naval trawler, sprung a leak in the engine room and sank when her boiler exploded south of New Sands gas buoy. Two of the crew were rescued from her rigging by the Spurn Head lifeboat. 10 or 11 crew were killed.

=== 26 March ===
List of shipwrecks: 26 March 1926
Ship	State	Description
Anne Sophie	United Kingdom	The sailing vessel sank at Légué, Côtes-du-Nord, France.

=== 27 March ===
List of shipwrecks: 27 March 1926
Ship	State	Description
Rubislaw	United Kingdom	The cargo ship collided with Mercur (Denmark) at Hamburg, Germany and was beached.

=== 30 March ===
List of shipwrecks: 30 March 1926
Ship	State	Description
Gaul	United Kingdom	The 129.9-foot (39.6 m), 270-ton steam trawler was wrecked on a reef in heavy weather on the north side of Ballevullin Bay northwest of Tiree, Inner Hebrides, Scotland. Seven of her crew died when her boat capsized, two then swam to shore.

== April ==
=== 1 April ===
List of shipwrecks: 1 April 1926
Ship	State	Description
C. Steward	United States	The 10-gross register ton motor vessel broke up while at anchor with no one aboard at Chignik, Territory of Alaska. Her wreck was abandoned.
Laleham	United Kingdom	The cargo ship was abandoned and set afire in the Atlantic Ocean (39°06′N 56°36′W). Her crew were rescued by Shirvan (United Kingdom).

=== 2 April ===
List of shipwrecks: 2 April 1926
Ship	State	Description
Dorrigo	Australia	The coaster foundered off Double Island Point, Queensland, Australia with the loss of 22 of her 24 crew.

=== 3 April ===
List of shipwrecks: 3 April 1926
Ship	State	Description
Uncle John	United States	During a voyage in the Territory of Alaska from Petersburg to Cordova carrying four crewmen and a cargo of eight tons of cannery supplies, the 26-gross register ton, 46.5-foot (14.2 m) motor vessel was wrecked without loss of life on a sandbar at the entrance of Dry Bay while seeking shelter from an offshore sandstorm.

=== 6 April ===
List of shipwrecks: 6 April 1926
Ship	State	Description
Ryuyo Maru	Japan	The cargo ship struck a submerged object at Tasuke and sank.

=== 8 April ===
List of shipwrecks: 8 April 1926
Ship	State	Description
O. T. Waring	United States	The tanker was severely damaged by and explosion and fire at New Orleans, Louisiana. Manx Isles (United Kingdom) was also damaged.

=== 9 April ===
List of shipwrecks: 9 April 1926
Ship	State	Description
Aeolus	Sweden	The coaster was severely damaged by fire at Stockholm.
Atlanta City	United States	The cargo ship caught fire and sank at Manila, Philippines.
Seal	United Kingdom	The cargo ship suffered an explosion aboard and fire at Grates Cove, Newfoundland and sank. Her crew were rescued by Eagle (United Kingdom).
Silvanus	Netherlands	The tanker collided with Thomas H. Wheeler (United States) in the Mississippi River 41 nautical miles (76 km) downstream from New Orleans, Louisiana. She caught fire and subsequently sank with some loss of life. Declared a total loss but subsequently rebuilt as Papoose.
Tokiwa Maru	Japan	The cargo ship ran aground at Chiuchu. She was still aground five days later.

=== 12 April ===
List of shipwrecks: 12 April 1926
Ship	State	Description
Bournemouth	United Kingdom	The cargo ship ran aground in the Paraná River at Rosario, Santa Fe, Argentina. She was refloated on 24 April.
Diamond O.	United States	The sternwheeler was destroyed by fire at Portland, Oregon.

=== 14 April ===
List of shipwrecks: 14 April 1926
Ship	State	Description
Tilly Russ I	Germany	The cargo ship struck a rock in Barösund, Finland and was beached in Hycklösund. She subsequently capsized and sank. Her crew survived.

=== 15 April ===
List of shipwrecks: 15 April 1926
Ship	State	Description
Morawitz	Hungary	The cargo ship ran aground in the Paraná River, Argentina. She was refloated on 19 April.

=== 16 April ===
List of shipwrecks: 16 April 1926
Ship	State	Description
Chiton	United Kingdom	The former War-class fleet oiler ran aground on Klein Curaçao, Netherlands Antilles. She was refloated on 27 April.

=== 18 April ===
List of shipwrecks: 18 April 1926
Ship	State	Description
Tana	Norway	The cargo ship caught fire at Valencia, Spain and was beached.

=== 20 April ===
List of shipwrecks: 20 April 1926
Ship	State	Description
Elena	Italy	The coaster foundered in the Tyrrhenian Sea off Amantea, Calabria.
Little Stefano	United Kingdom	The schooner was dismasted and abandoned in the Atlantic Ocean (approximately 35°N 35°W). Her crew were rescued by Carimare (France).
M.F.C.	France	The schooner was abandoned and set afire in the Atlantic Ocean (49°14′N 10°05′W). Her crew were rescued by West Eldara (United States).

=== 22 April ===
List of shipwrecks: 22 April 1926
Ship	State	Description
Fratelli Monteneri	Italy	The schooner was sunk in the Mediterranean Sea (34°35′N 19°15′E) by the explosion of her cargo of benzine. Five of her six crew were lost, the survivor was rescued by Greldon (United Kingdom).

=== 25 April ===
List of shipwrecks: 25 April 1926
Ship	State	Description
WTB Co. No. 35	United States	The barge was wrecked at Cape Hinchinbrook, Territory of Alaska, near the southern end of Hinchinbrook Island adjacent to Prince William Sound, during a gale.
WTB Co. No. 55	United States	While under tow by the tug Forest T. Crosby (United States) and carrying a 300-ton cargo that included machinery and boilers on a voyage from Seattle, Washington to Port Hobron on Kodiak Island, the 458-ton, 153-foot (47 m) scow's towline broke when a gale with 80 mph (130 km/h) winds suddenly struck. She was driven ashore at Cape Hinchinbrook, Territory of Alaska, near the southern end of Hinchinbrook Island adjacent to Prince William Sound, and broke up, becoming a total loss. There was no loss of life.
WTB Co. No. 58	United States	The barge was wrecked at Cape Hinchinbrook, Territory of Alaska, near the southern end of Hinchinbrook Island adjacent to Prince William Sound, during a gale.

=== 26 April ===
List of shipwrecks: 26 April 1926
Ship	State	Description
Aghios Georgios	Greece	The cargo ship struck a submerged wreck in the River Plate and was beached. She was refloated on 30 April.
Agios Georgios	Greece	The brigantine ran aground on Kea and was wrecked.

=== 27 April ===
List of shipwrecks: 27 April 1926
Ship	State	Description
Chichubu Maru	Japan	The passenger ship sank off Horomushiro with the loss of 150 of the 249 people aboard.
Eugenio Dutrus	Spain	The cargo ship ran aground on the Cabezos Shoals and was beached north of Tarifa, Andalusia. She was declared a total loss on 29 April.
Mentor	Greece	The cargo ship ran aground in the Danube at Sulina, Romania. She was refloated on 1 May.

=== 30 April ===
List of shipwrecks: 30 April 1926
Ship	State	Description
Earl of Powis	United Kingdom	The tug ran aground at Leith, Lothian and sank. Her crew were rescued. She was refloated on 29 May. Subsequently repaired and returned to service.

== May ==
=== 11 May ===
List of shipwrecks: 11 May 1926
Ship	State	Description
H.A.M. No.3	Netherlands	While in tow of tug Kraus from Surabaya, Dutch East Indies to Melbourne, Australia, the 339-ton cutter suction dredger foundered in stormy weather off Sugar Loaf Point, near Newcastle, New South Wales. H.A.M. No.3 was converted from the hull of the gunboat Wespe of 1876.

=== 13 May ===
List of shipwrecks: 13 May 1926
Ship	State	Description
Edith	United States	With no one on board, the 245-gross register ton, 120-foot (36.6 m) freight barge was wrecked at Big Port Walter in Port Walter, Territory of Alaska.

=== 18 May ===
List of shipwrecks: 18 May 1926
Ship	State	Description
Kanazawa Maru	Japan	The cargo ship sank in the Yellow Sea off Chemulpo, Korea.

=== 19 May ===
List of shipwrecks: 19 May 1926
Ship	State	Description
Ella M	United States	With no one aboard, the 17-ton motor vessel dragged her anchor during a gale and was wrecked on Afognak Beach (58°00′30″N 152°46′00″W) on Afognak Island in the Territory of Alaska's Kodiak Archipelago.

=== 20 May ===
List of shipwrecks: 20 May 1926
Ship	State	Description
Chiayang	United Kingdom	The cargo ship struck rocks in the Yangtze 48 nautical miles (89 km) in China above Ichang. She was beached at Yehtan. She was declared a total loss on 26 May.

=== 23 May ===
List of shipwrecks: 23 May 1926
Ship	State	Description
Dr. Martin	United States	During a voyage in the Territory of Alaska from Fortuna Ledge to Holy Cross, the 28-gross register ton motor vessel caught fire on the Yukon River near Paimiut. Her crew of six beached her and survived, but she became a total loss.

=== 25 May ===
List of shipwrecks: 25 May 1926
Ship	State	Description
Manchester Civilian	United Kingdom	The cargo ship ran aground at Cloridorme, Quebec, Canada. She was refloated on 19 July.

=== 26 May ===
List of shipwrecks: 26 May 1926
Ship	State	Description
USS L-8	United States Navy	The decommissioned L-class submarine was sunk as a target in a torpedo test in 120 feet (37 m) of water off Newport, Rhode Island, 3 nautical miles (5.6 km; 3.5 mi) south of the Brenton Reef light tower.

=== 29 May ===
List of shipwrecks: 29 May 1926
Ship	State	Description
Fukuoka Maru	Japan	The cargo ship ran aground at Shriyasaki, Japan. She was refloated on 6 June.

== June ==
=== 1 June ===
List of shipwrecks: 1 June 1926
Ship	State	Description
Washington Irving	United States	The paddle steamer collided with one of the barges being pushed by the tug Thomas E. Moran (United States) and sank in the Hudson River at New York with the loss of three lives. She was raised on 13 February 1927 but was subsequently declared a total loss.

=== 2 June ===
List of shipwrecks: 2 June 1926
Ship	State	Description
Crater	United Kingdom	The 99.4-foot (30.3 m), 132-ton steam trawler was sunk when she struck a submerged object off the River Tyne.

=== 3 June ===
List of shipwrecks: 3 June 1926
Ship	State	Description
Cecelie	France	The schooner was dismasted in the Atlantic Ocean (49°10′N 4°07′W) and was abandoned. Her crew were rescued by Wagogo (Germany).
Else	Finland	The barque ran aground at Skag, Örnsköldsvik, Sweden and was wrecked.

=== 6 June ===
List of shipwrecks: 6 June 1926
Ship	State	Description
Herbert	United Kingdom	The Thames barge collided with Carrickmore (United Kingdom) in the River Thames at Gravesend, Kent and sank. Her crew were rescued.

=== 7 June ===
List of shipwrecks: 7 June 1926
Ship	State	Description
Barsac	France	The cargo ship struck a rock and was beached at Le Conquet, Finistère.

=== 8 June ===
List of shipwrecks: 8 June 1926
Ship	State	Description
Atlantus	United States	Atlantus The concrete ship, scheduled to be used as a pier, broke loose from her moorings in a storm and went aground 150 feet off Sunset Beach, New Jersey. All attempts to refloat her were unsuccessful and she was abandoned. The wreck was still on the beach in September 2007.

=== 10 June ===
List of shipwrecks: 10 June 1926
Ship	State	Description
Chasseloup Laubat	Marine Nationale	The Friant-class cruiser was struck by St. Louis (France) at Dakar, French West Africa and sank. She was refloated on 15 June.

=== 11 June ===
List of shipwrecks: 11 June 1926
Ship	State	Description
Araucania	Chile	The coaster was driven ashore at Valparaíso and wrecked.
Campanita	United Kingdom	The tug was struck by Miramar (Chile) at Valparaíso and sank.
Cophive	United Kingdom	The tug was struck by Miramar (Chile) at Valparaíso and sank.
Cordillera	Chile	The tug was struck by Brasilia (Germany) at Valparaíso and sank.
Don Roberto	Chile	The coaster was driven ashore at Valparaíso and wrecked.
Edith	Chile	The sailing ship was driven ashore at Chiloe and was wrecked.
Golden Fleece	United Kingdom	The tug was struck by Miramar (Chile) at Valparaíso and sank.
Jasper	United Kingdom	The tug was driven ashore at Valparaíso and wrecked.
Miramar	Chile	The cargo ship broke free from her mooring at Valparaíso. She struck several tugs and was wrecked.
Nita	United Kingdom	The tug was struck by Miramar (Chile) at Valparaíso and sank.
Wallaroo	United Kingdom	The tug was struck by Miramar (Chile) at Valparaíso and sank.

=== 13 June ===
List of shipwrecks: 13 June 1926
Ship	State	Description
Alps Maru	Japan	Tugboats and a barge attend the sunken Alps Maru on 15 June 1926 The cargo ship ran aground off Vlissingen, Netherlands and broke in two. She further broke up on 3 July, the sterns section sinking with the loss of two lives.
Eliopoli	Italy	The cargo ship struck a submerged object 70 nautical miles (130 km) north east of Cabo Polonio, Uruguay and sank. Her crew were rescued by Bibbco (United States).
Hastings County	Norway	The cargo ship ran aground off the Auskerry Lighthouse, Orkney Islands, United Kingdom. She was declared a total loss on 21 July.
Hwa Tai	China	The cargo ship collided with Eumaeus (United Kingdom) in the Whangpo River at Shanghai and was beached.

=== 14 June ===
List of shipwrecks: 14 June 1926
Ship	State	Description
Geneva	United States	The schooner was abandoned on fire in the Atlantic Ocean south east of Florida. Her crew were rescued by an American steamship.
S & E #3	United States	Under tow during a voyage from Seattle, Washington, to Hidden Inlet, Territory of Alaska, with a deck cargo of anchors, cables, wire netting, and rails, the 25-gross register ton scow capsized in Johnstone Strait along the northeast coast of Vancouver Island, British Columbia, Canada, off the south end of Hanson Island, apparently after springing a leak. After making four attempts to right S & E #3 over the course of almost 4 1/2 hours, the tug towing her was forced to give up on trying to save her.

=== 15 June ===
List of shipwrecks: 15 June 1926
Ship	State	Description
Storm King	United States	The Design 1025 cargo ship ran aground at Cape Serrat, Tunisia. She was declared a total loss on 27 July.

=== 16 June ===
List of shipwrecks: 16 June 1926
Ship	State	Description
City of Naples	United Kingdom	The cargo ship ran aground off Ommaizaki, Japan. Her crew were taken off the next day by Kasuga (Imperial Japanese Navy).
Delft	Netherlands	The cargo ship ran aground on Santa Clara Island, Chile. She was declared a total loss on 12 July.

=== 17 June ===
List of shipwrecks: 17 June 1926
Ship	State	Description
Rheinland	Germany	The cargo ship collided with Mitsuki Maru (Japan) in the Yantze at Hankow, China and was beached. Salvage efforts were abandoned on 22 June.

=== 18 June ===
List of shipwrecks: 18 June 1926
Ship	State	Description
USFS Sea Gull	United States Bureau of Fisheries	The 31-foot (9.4 m) fishery patrol vessel was destroyed by fire in the Territory of Alaska.

=== 20 June ===
List of shipwrecks: 20 June 1926
Ship	State	Description
Minnie	United States	The 8-gross register ton, 34.7-foot (10.6 m) fishing vessel was destroyed by fire at Excursion Inlet in Southeast Alaska. The only person on board survived.
Winnie	United States	The motor vessel was lost at Excursion Inlet in Southeast Alaska.

=== 24 June ===
List of shipwrecks: 24 June 1926
Ship	State	Description
Falmouth	United States	The schooner was destroyed by fire in the Atlantic Ocean. Her crew were rescued.

=== 27 June ===
List of shipwrecks: 27 June 1926
Ship	State	Description
Ancud	United Kingdom	The cargo ship was destroyed by fire at Valparaíso, Chile. She was towed out of port, sinking on 28 June.

=== 30 June ===
List of shipwrecks: 30 June 1926
Ship	State	Description
Gardelaki	Greece	The cargo ship ran aground at Kouroytchesme, Turkey. She was refloated on 2 July.
Maria Parera	Argentina	The ferry collided with Lucia Cardo (Argentina) and sank. Salvage efforts were abandoned on 22 July.

== July ==
=== 1 July ===
List of shipwrecks: 1 July 1926
Ship	State	Description
Taiyu Maru	Japan	The cargo ship came ashore on at Samaruka, Siberia, Soviet Union. She was refloated on 30 July.

=== 2 July ===
List of shipwrecks: 2 July 1926
Ship	State	Description
North Wind	United States	The cargo ship struck rocks and foundered in Lake Erie.
Queen of Nassau	United States	The passenger ship sank in the Atlantic Ocean off Islamorada, Florida.

=== 7 July ===
List of shipwrecks: 7 July 1926
Ship	State	Description
Ruth	Norway	The cargo ship ran aground in the Paraná River, Argentina. She was refloated on 13 July.

=== 8 July ===
List of shipwrecks: 8 July 1926
Ship	State	Description
Cooma	United Kingdom	Cooma The cargo liner ran aground on the North Reef, off the coast of Queensland. She was abandoned on 10 July. Cooma was declared a total loss on 12 July. She was gutted by fire on 1 January 1927.
Port Kembla	United States	The cargo ship ran aground on San Salvador Island, Bahamas. Her crew were taken off towards the end of July by Marair. Salvage efforts were abandoned in early August.

=== 9 July ===
List of shipwrecks: 9 July 1926
Ship	State	Description
Aylestone	United Kingdom	The cargo ship ran aground at Fernando de Noronha in the Atlantic Ocean off Brazil. Her crew were rescued.
Gladys	United States	The 11-gross register ton fishing vessel was destroyed in Southeast Alaska approximately 28 nautical miles (52 km; 32 mi) south-southeast of Coronation Island by a fire that began when a kerosene blowtorch being used on her machinery ignited a fire that went out of control. Her crew of three abandoned ship in a lifeboat and was picked up by a trolling boat between the Spanish Islands (55.9605556°N 134.1258333°W) and Cape Decision.

=== 10 July ===
List of shipwrecks: 10 July 1926
Ship	State	Description
Meteor	United States	Carrying a cargo of 3,500 tons of coal, the collier was wrecked in fog without loss of life 150 yards (137 m) off Spar Point on the southern shore of Block Island off the coast of Rhode Island at 41°08′46″N 071°35′04″W. Her wreck settled in 10 to 20 feet (3.0 to 6.1 m) of water.

=== 12 July ===
List of shipwrecks: 12 July 1926
Ship	State	Description
Cambria	United Kingdom	The passenger ship, a paddle steamer, ran aground in Combe Martin Bay, Devon. Her 500 passengers were taken off by Richard Crowley ( Royal National Lifeboat Institution). She was refloated later that day.
Kirkwynd	United Kingdom	The cargo ship ran aground in Cymyran Bay. Her crew were rescued. She was refloated the next day.
Melrose Abbey	United Kingdom	The coaster collided with Girasol (United Kingdom) off The Lizard, Cornwall and sank. Her crew were rescued by Girasol.

=== 13 July ===
List of shipwrecks: 13 July 1926
Ship	State	Description
Atlantus	United States	The hull of the stripped 1040-class, 250-foot (76 m), concrete-hulled merchant ship, intended to be used as a pier, was driven ashore in a storm at Cape May Point.

=== 14 July ===
List of shipwrecks: 14 July 1926
Ship	State	Description
Fontainbleu	France	The cargo liner caught fire and was abandoned at Djibouti, French Somaliland and was abandoned. She was declared a total loss.

=== 15 July ===
List of shipwrecks: 15 July 1926
Ship	State	Description
Gannet	United Kingdom	The Thames barge collided with Corcove (United Kingdom) in the River Thames at Gravesend, Kent and sank. Her crew were rescued.
Louisiana	Denmark	The cargo ship ran aground at Point Indio, Argentina. She was refloated on 19 July.

=== 16 July ===
List of shipwrecks: 16 July 1926
Ship	State	Description
Emma L	Canada	The tug collided with Brulin (Canada) in Lake St. Louis and sank with the loss of six lives.
Home	United Kingdom	The cargo ship ran aground at Fogo, Dominion of Newfoundland. She was refloated on 24 July.
Kooringa	United Kingdom	The coaster caught fire and sank off Cape Shanck, Victoria, Australia.

=== 17 July ===
List of shipwrecks: 17 July 1926
Ship	State	Description
Julia Luckenbach	United States	The cargo ship ran aground at Kalama, Washington. She was refloated on 22 July.

=== 18 July ===
List of shipwrecks: 18 July 1926
Ship	State	Description
Buster	United States	The 31-gross register ton motor vessel sank just outside Funter Bay on the west coast of Admiralty Island in the Alexander Archipelago in Southeast Alaska. She had caught fire the previous day and burned all night before sinking. Her crew of six survived.
Trelawney	United Kingdom	The cargo ship collided with Gaelic Prince (United Kingdom) in the Bristol Channel during thick fog. All crew 28 crew were rescued by Gaelic Prince but the ship's cat perished.
William Shepherd	United Kingdom	The ketch sank at Connah's Quay, Flintshire.

=== 20 July ===
List of shipwrecks: 20 July 1926
Ship	State	Description
Burnside	United Kingdom	The cargo ship ran aground at Port Edgar, Lothian. She was refloated on 26 July.

=== 21 July ===
List of shipwrecks: 21 July 1926
Ship	State	Description
Pompei	Italy	The tug foundered in the Mediterranean Sea 8 nautical miles (15 km) off Bastia, Corsica, France. Her crew survived.

=== 22 July ===
List of shipwrecks: 22 July 1926
Ship	State	Description
Harry R. Jones	United States	The cargo ship collided with Francis E. House (United States) in the Soo River and was beached.
Yoko Maru	Japan	The cargo ship ran aground at Rumoye, Hokkaidō. She was refloated on 27 July.

=== 23 July ===
List of shipwrecks: 23 July 1926
Ship	State	Description
Myrtle H	United States	The 23-gross register ton motor vessel was wrecked on a sandbar 2 nautical miles (3.7 km; 2.3 mi) from Boswell Bay (60°24′N 146°08′W) on Hinchinbrook Island at the entrance to Prince William Sound on the south-central coast of the Territory of Alaska.

=== 26 July ===
List of shipwrecks: 26 July 1926
Ship	State	Description
West Faralon	United States	The Design 1133 cargo ship ran aground on Vries Island in the Kuril Islands. She was refloated on 29 July.

=== 27 July ===
List of shipwrecks: 27 July 1926
Ship	State	Description
Hakuho Maru	Japan	The cargo ship ran aground at Mera. She was refloated on 3 August.

=== 30 July ===
List of shipwrecks: 30 July 1926
Ship	State	Description
Cawdor Castle	United Kingdom	The cargo ship ran aground in Conception Bay, South-West Africa. She broke up over the following weeks and was a complete wreck by early September.
Nordpol	Norway	The cargo ship sank in the Atlantic Ocean off the west coast of Iceland.

=== Unknown date ===
List of shipwrecks: Unknown date July 1926
Ship	State	Description
Reiyo Maru	Japan	The cargo ship hit a submerged rock off the Aleutian Islands. She flooded and settled on the bottom up to the bridge sometime in July before being salvaged at an unknown date.

== August ==
=== 2 August ===
List of shipwrecks: 2 August 1926
Ship	State	Description
A. F. Coats	United States	The schooner was destroyed by fire at Ponce, Puerto Rico.

=== 4 August ===
List of shipwrecks: 4 August 1926
Ship	State	Description
Bitar	Brazil	The coaster collided with a pontoon in the Bay of Araras and sank with the loss of 26 lives.
Discovery	United States	The 17-gross register ton fishing vessel struck a rock and sank in Chatham Strait in the Alexander Archipelago in Southeast Alaska. Her crew of four survived.

=== 5 August ===
List of shipwrecks: 5 August 1926
Ship	State	Description
Norlina	United States	The cargo ship ran aground at Gerstle Cove near Salt Point, California and was a total loss.

=== 6 August ===
List of shipwrecks: 6 August 1926
Ship	State	Description
Llangorse	United Kingdom	The cargo ship ran aground in the Paraná River, Argentina. She was refloated on 13 August.

=== 7 August ===
List of shipwrecks: 7 August 1926
Ship	State	Description
Ringhorn	Norway	The cargo ship ran aground on Scatarie Island, Nova Scotia, Canada with some loss of life. She broke up and was a total loss.
Tayuen Maru	Japan	The cargo ship was destroyed by fire in the Yangtze 50 nautical miles (93 km) upstream of Hankow, China.

=== 9 August ===
List of shipwrecks: 9 August 1926
Ship	State	Description
HMS H29	Royal Navy	The H-class submarine sank at HMNB Devonport with the loss of six lives.
Pemba	United Kingdom	The coaster foundered in the Indian Ocean off the east coast of South Africa.

=== 10 August ===
List of shipwrecks: 10 August 1926
Ship	State	Description
Daisy	United Kingdom	The cargo ship sank at San Francisco, California.
Sadie A. Knickle	United Kingdom	The schooner foundered off Sable Island, Nova Scotia, Canada with the loss of all 22 crew.
Sylvia Mosher	United Kingdom	The schooner was wrecked at Halifax, Nova Scotia with the loss of all 26 crew.
Yayoi	Imperial Japanese Navy	Japanese aircraft sank the decommissioned destroyer as a target off the Oki Islands in the Sea of Japan.

=== 13 August ===
List of shipwrecks: 13 August 1926
Ship	State	Description
Albert San	Australia	The former Castle-class trawler was wrecked on this date.

=== 14 August ===
List of shipwrecks: 14 August 1926
Ship	State	Description
Oak Branch	United Kingdom	The cargo ship ran aground on the Negrilla Reef, Colombia. She was refloated but was consequently beached at Buenaventura, Valle del Cauca.
Tokei Maru	Japan	The cargo ship ran aground in the Yangtze 20 nautical miles (37 km) downstream of Nanking, China. She was refloated on 30 August.

=== 15 August ===
List of shipwrecks: 15 August 1926
Ship	State	Description
Kwaiun Maru No.2	Japan	The cargo ship was wrecked off Tsaofeitien Lighthouse, China. She broke into three sections, but her crew were rescued.

=== 16 August ===
List of shipwrecks: 16 August 1926
Ship	State	Description
J. J.	United States	After salvaging her gasoline engine and fittings, the 15-gross register ton motor vessel's owner broke her up and abandoned her wreck at Kodiak, Territory of Alaska.
Orna	United Kingdom	The cargo ship ran aground in the River Hooghly, India. She was refloated on 19 August.

=== 18 August ===
List of shipwrecks: 18 August 1926
Ship	State	Description
Pyrite	France	The cargo ship came ashore at Tintingoe, Madagascar and was a total loss.

=== 19 August ===
List of shipwrecks: 19 August 1926
Ship	State	Description
Artico	Italy	The cargo ship ran aground in the Paraná River at Point Indio, Argentina.
Eleanor F. Bartram	United States	The schooner departed Norfolk, Virginia for Puerto Cabello, Venezuela. No further trace, presumed foundered in the Atlantic Ocean with the loss of all hands.

=== 20 August ===
List of shipwrecks: 20 August 1926
Ship	State	Description
Espagne	France	The cargo ship ran aground in Algiers Bay. She was refloated on 26 August.
Howard M. Grekin	United States	The ship foundered in Lake Erie five miles (8.0 km) east of Erie, Pennsylvania with the loss of four crew.
Julia	Sweden	The cargo ship capsized off Gotland. Her crew were rescued.

=== 25 August ===
List of shipwrecks: 25 August 1926
Ship	State	Description
Ambria	Germany	The cargo ship collided with Mimi (United Kingdom) in the Atlantic Ocean off the Longships Lighthouse. She was towed by Mimi to Plymouth, Devon and was beached. She was refloated on 27 August.
L. E. Patton	United States	1926 Louisiana hurricane: The steamer sank during a hurricane near Convent, Louisiana with the loss of nine of ten crew.
Valsesia	Italy	The cargo ship ran aground at Treharne Point, Glamorgan. Her crew survived. She broke her back and was a total loss.

=== 26 August ===
List of shipwrecks: 26 August 1926
Ship	State	Description
Reciprocity	United Kingdom	The coaster caught fire off Bull Bay, Anglesey and was abandoned by her crew.
Storviken	Norway	The cargo ship ran aground at the mouth of the Yangtze, China. She was refloated on 4 September.

=== 27 August ===
List of shipwrecks: 27 August 1926
Ship	State	Description
Pisagua	Chilean Navy	The tender was in collision with Magallanes (Chile) off Point Puchoo and sank.

=== 28 August ===
List of shipwrecks: 28 August 1926
Ship	State	Description
Heian Maru	Japan	The coaster foundered off the west coast of Sakhalin, Soviet Union with the loss of 12 of her 13 crew.

=== 29 August ===
List of shipwrecks: 29 August 1926
Ship	State	Description
Budeny	Soviet Union	The cargo ship collided with Kut (United Kingdom) in the English Channel off Dungeness, Kent. She was towed to Dover and beached.

=== 30 August ===
List of shipwrecks: 30 August 1926
Ship	State	Description
Burevestnik	Soviet Union	The passenger ship collided with a pier at Leningrad and sank with great loss of life.
Galileo	United Kingdom	The cargo ship caught fire in New York Harbor, United States. She capsized and sank.
Kaikyu Maru	Japan	The cargo ship struck a rock and was beached in Vere Cove, Newfoundland. She was refloated on 5 October.
Nootka	United States	The 40-gross register ton fishing vessel caught fire after her gasoline engine backfired, then sank 1.5 nautical miles (2.8 km; 1.7 mi) off the coast of Southeast Alaska about 3 nautical miles (5.6 km; 3.5 mi) south of Gut Bay (56°44′00″N 134°38′30″W). Her two crew members survived and were rescued by the motor vessel Ellrington (United States).
North	United States	The motor schooner was lost at Great Bay – now Starrigavan Bay (57°08′00″N 135°22′30″W) – in Southeast Alaska.
Tampa	United States	The cargo ship collided with Solitaire (United States) at Tampa, Florida and was beached. She was refloated on 4 September.
Zillah	United States	The cargo ship foundered in Whitefish Bay off Whitefish Point, Michigan.

== September ==
=== 1 September ===
List of shipwrecks: 1 September 1926
Ship	State	Description
Kambole	United Kingdom	The cargo ship collided with J. Duncan (United Kingdom) in the Thames Estuary and was beached.
Karl	Latvia	The cargo ship collided with the trawler Caldy (United Kingdom) in the English Channel 10 nautical miles (19 km) off Start Point, Devnon, United Kingdom. She towed Caldy into Plymouth but she had to be beached on arrival.

=== 2 September ===
List of shipwrecks: 2 September 1926
Ship	State	Description
Felipe	Spain	The cargo ship collided with El Uruguayo (United Kingdom) in the English Channel off St Catherine's Point, Isle of Wight, United Kingdom and sank. Her crew was rescued by El Uruguayo.
HMAS Platypus II	Royal Australian Navy	HMAS Platypus II, 2007 The breastwork monitor was sunk as breakwater at Half Moon Bay, Victoria.
Santa Julia	Peru	The cargo ship sprang a leak and was beached at Samanco.

=== 3 September ===
List of shipwrecks: 3 September 1926
Ship	State	Description
Cassard	France	The cargo ship collided with Kurdistan (United Kingdom) in the English Channel 10 nautical miles (19 km) off Dungeness, Kent, United Kingdom and was severely damaged. Her crew were rescued by Kurdistan and she was beached at Sandgate. She was refloated on 13 September.
Sapele	United Kingdom	The cargo liner ran aground at Forcados, Nigeria (5°26′00″N 5°11′30″E). Her passengers were transferred to Boma (United Kingdom). Sapele was refloated on 9 September.
Volumnia	United Kingdom	The cargo ship collided with Djembi (Netherlands) in the English Channel 4 nautical miles (7.4 km) west of Dover, Kent and was beached at Folkestone Warren.

=== 4 September ===
List of shipwrecks: 4 September 1926
Ship	State	Description
Clevennes	France	The cargo ship struck a rock and was beached at Brest, Finistère.
Golden Cape	United States	The cargo ship departed the Hampton Roads for Rio de Janeiro, Brazil. No further trace, presumed foundered in the Atlantic Ocean off the coast of Florida in a hurricane.
Ricardo Hernandez	Spain	The sailing ship came ashore 80 nautical miles (150 km) west of Havana, Cuba and was abandoned.

=== 7 September ===
List of shipwrecks: 7 September 1926
Ship	State	Description
Albert W. Robinson	United States	The schooner caught fire in the Atlantic Ocean 150 nautical miles (280 km) off the Virginia Capes and was abandoned. Her crew were rescued.

=== 8 September ===
List of shipwrecks: 8 September 1926
Ship	State	Description
Haleakala	United States	The cargo ship, which had departed the Hampton Roads on 3 September for Rio de Janeiro, Brazil, was in contact with Nevada (Denmark), which was unable to re-establish contact the following day. Believed foundered in the Atlantic Ocean off Florida with the loss of all hands.

=== 9 September ===
List of shipwrecks: 9 September 1926
Ship	State	Description
Neubad	Latvia	The passenger ship foundered in the Baltic Sea off the mouth of the Aa with the loss of over 30 lives.

=== 10 September ===
List of shipwrecks: 10 September 1926
Ship	State	Description
Schenectady	United States	The cargo ship ran aground in the Baltic Sea 4 nautical miles (7.4 km) south east of the Saipan Lightship (Finland). She was refloated on 15 September.

=== 11 September ===
List of shipwrecks: 11 September 1926
Ship	State	Description
Christel Vinnen	Germany	The auxiliary sailing vessel collided with Canadian Transport (United Kingdom) in the Paraná River at Ibkoy, Argentina and sank.

=== 14 September ===
List of shipwrecks: 14 September 1926
Ship	State	Description
Loyal Citizen	United Kingdom	The cargo ship sprang a leak in the Atlantic Ocean off Bermuda (31°18′N 67°00′W) and sank.
Roseway	United States	The schooner sank at Wolfville, Nova Scotia Canada.
Utah	France	The cargo ship ran aground at Punta San Juan, Peru and was a total loss.

=== 15 September ===
List of shipwrecks: 15 September 1926
Ship	State	Description
Douglas	United Kingdom	The cargo ship struck a rock off Sheep Island, Argyllshire and was wrecked.
Virginia Dare	United States	The schooner ran aground at Manaubo, Puerto Rico and was abandoned with the loss of her captain. Her crew later reboarded her and she was refloated on 17 September.

=== 16 September ===
List of shipwrecks: 16 September 1926
Ship	State	Description
Bru	Norway	The cargo ship sprang a leak in the North Sea and was beached at Kristiansand, Norway.
Bulgarian	United Kingdom	The cargo ship ran aground at Marmara, Turkey. She was refloated on 20 September.
USCGC CG-247	United States Coast Guard	The cutter was lost in a hurricane.
USCGC CG-248	United States Coast Guard	The cutter was lost in a hurricane.
Ellenia	Italy	The cargo ship collided with Induna (United Kingdom) in the Atlantic Ocean (49°50′N 11°30′W) and sank. Assistance offered by Olympic (United Kingdom) was refused. Her crew were rescued by the fishing vessel Petite Suzanne (France).
Westlea	United Kingdom	The cargo ship collided with Dosina in the English Channel off Portland Bill, Dorset. She proceeded to Portsmouth, Hampshire where she was beached.

=== 17 September ===
List of shipwrecks: 17 September 1926
Ship	State	Description
Aizawa Maru	Japan	The coaster sank off Cape Omaezaki.
Annie	United States	While drifting so her captain could investigate a problem with her gasoline engine during a voyage from Ketchikan, Territory of Alaska, to Baranof Island with a cargo of eight tons of ice, the 11-net register ton motor vessel sank three minutes after the motor vessel Commonwealth (United States) collided with her off Point Colpoys (56°20′N 133°12′W) in Sumner Strait in the Alexander Archipelago in Southeast Alaska. Commonwealth rescued both members of her crew.
Dagmar	Sweden	The cargo ship foundered in the Baltic Sea with some loss of life.

=== 20 September ===
List of shipwrecks: 20 September 1926
Ship	State	Description
Kiowa	United States	The cargo ship ran aground in the Bahamas. She was refloated on 28 September.
Ribblebank	United Kingdom	The cargo ship ran aground near Annan, Dumfriesshire. She was still aground a week later.
Temeraire	Norway	The cargo ship ran aground at Renhallen. She was declared a total loss on 11 November.

=== 22 September ===
List of shipwrecks: 22 September 1926
Ship	State	Description
J. B. Llovera	Spain	The passenger ship collided with Antonio Cola (Spain) and sank in the Mediterranean Sea 4 nautical miles (7.4 km) off Alboaza Point, Spanish Morocco. All aboard were rescued by Antonio Cola.

=== 23 September ===
List of shipwrecks: 23 September 1926
Ship	State	Description
Kentucky	United States	The 39-gross register ton, 55.3-foot (16.9 m) fishing vessel was destroyed by fire at Halibut Cove on the coast of the Territory of Alaska. The wreck report does not indicate which of various places named "Halibut Cove" along the Alaskan coast the fire occurred in.
Thorpe Grange	United Kingdom	The cargo ship ran aground in the Paraná River 12 nautical miles (22 km) upstream of Zarate, Argentina. She was refloated on 26 September.

=== 24 September ===
List of shipwrecks: 24 September 1926
Ship	State	Description
Carl White	United States	Deemed unfit for further use and a total loss, the 43-gross register ton sternwheel paddle steamer was reported abandoned at Fairbanks, Territory of Alaska.

=== 25 September ===
List of shipwrecks: 25 September 1926
Ship	State	Description
Moon	United Kingdom	The cargo ship sprang a leak and was beached on Scatarie Island, Nova Scotia, Canada. She was declared a constructive total loss.
Uppland	Sweden	The passenger ship collided with Levante (Italy) in the Atlantic Ocean (36°05′N 5°10′W) and sank with the loss of a crew member.

=== 26 September ===
List of shipwrecks: 26 September 1926
Ship	State	Description
Sea Serpent	United Kingdom	The cargo ship arrived at Port-au-Prince, Haiti on fire and was scuttled. She was declared a total loss.
Shonga	United Kingdom	The cargo ship caught fire at Sapele, Nigeria and was scuttled. She was refloated on 5 October.

=== 27 September ===
List of shipwrecks: 27 September 1926
Ship	State	Description
Hudson Maru	Japan	The cargo ship was driven ashore on Sakhalin during a typhoon. She was refloated on 29 September. She was refloated on 1 October.
Kohyo Maru	Japan	The cargo ship was driven ashore on Sakhalin during a typhoon. She was refloated on 8 October.
Mary	United States	The 10-gross register ton motor vessel was towed to shore by the motor vessel Virginia E (United States) and beached in a sinking condition after she collided with Virginia E in Tongass Narrows in the Inside Passage in Southeast Alaska during a voyage from Saxman to Chomly, Territory of Alaska. She was declared a total loss. Virginia E rescued all four people aboard Mary.
Mexico	United States	The passenger ship ran aground off Sisal, Yucatán, Mexico. All 90 passengers were taken off and landed at Havana, Cuba. She was refloated on 29 September.
Seiwa Maru	Japan	The cargo ship was driven ashore on Sakhalin during a typhoon. She was refloated on 8 October.
Shinnoh Maru	Japan	The cargo ship was driven ashore on Sakhalin during a typhoon. She was refloated on 29 September.
Taibu Maru	Japan	The cargo ship was driven ashore on Sakhalin during a typhoon. She was refloated on 28 September. She was refloated on 1 October.
Tokai Maru	Japan	The cargo ship was driven ashore on Sakhalin during a typhoon. She was refloated on 13 October.
Yeboshi Maru	Japan	The cargo ship was driven ashore on Sakhalin during a typhoon. She was refloated on 1 October.

=== 28 September ===
List of shipwrecks: 28 September 1926
Ship	State	Description
City of Edmunds	United States	The passenger ferry was destroyed by fire at Port Gamble, Washington.
Nancy Lee	United States	The cargo ship was stranded at New York in a storm. She was refloated on 29 October.

=== 29 September ===
List of shipwrecks: 29 September 1926
Ship	State	Description
San Juan	United States	The cargo ship was wrecked in a hurricane at Veracruz.

=== Unknown date ===
List of shipwrecks: Unknown date September 1926
Ship	State	Description
HMS Raleigh	Royal Navy	The wreck of the Hawkins-class cruiser – aground in Forteau Bay, Labrador, Dominion of Newfoundland, since 8 August 1922 – was destroyed with explosives.

== October ==
=== 3 October ===
List of shipwrecks: 3 October 1926
Ship	State	Description
Leelite	United Kingdom	The coaster was cut in two and sank in collision with trawler Amorelle (United Kingdom) near Would Lightvessel off Cromer, Norfolk, on voyage from Ghent for Dundee; five survived from crew of nine.
Opua	United Kingdom	The coaster came ashore at Cape Palliser, North Island, New Zealand. She was abandoned as a total loss on 8 October.

=== 6 October ===
List of shipwrecks: 6 October 1926
Ship	State	Description
Doris	Greece	The tanker caught fire in the Aegean Sea and was beached at Aegnoussa.

=== 8 October ===
List of shipwrecks: 8 October 1926
Ship	State	Description
Albatross	United States	The 21-gross register ton motor vessel caught fire at the entrance to Ward Cove in Southeast Alaska, four nautical miles (7.4 km; 4.6 mi) north of Ketchikan, Territory of Alaska, when her gasoline engine backfired. The vessel Helen H (United States) towed her to the beach in the hope that the Katchikan Fire Department could extinguish the flames, but the receding tide left Albatross in a location where the fire department could not reach her and the fire destroyed her completely. Her crew of two survived.

=== 9 October ===
List of shipwrecks: 9 October 1926
Ship	State	Description
Jura	United Kingdom	The cargo ship was driven ashore in Murkle Bay and was abandoned by her crew.
Richard	Denmark	The four-masted schooner ran aground at Ballantrae, Ayrshire, United Kingdom. All six crew were rescued by rocket apparatus.
Ursus	France	The tug collided with Paris (France) at Le Havre, Seine Maritime and sank with the loss of 10 crew.

=== 10 October ===
List of shipwrecks: 10 October 1926
Ship	State	Description
Athena	United Kingdom	The cargo ship was abandoned. Her crew were rescued by Port Wellington (United Kingdom).
Baltic	Sweden	The cargo ship ran aground at Trollharen. She was refloated on 15 October.
Denemarken	Netherlands	The tug was hit by Larenberg (Netherlands) in the Maas and sank with the loss of all four crew.
Glenscott	United Kingdom	The schooner was driven ashore at Kingscross, Ayrshire and was abandoned by her crew.
Wisla	Poland	The cargo ship was driven ashore at Terschelling, Netherlands with the loss of two crew.

=== 11 October ===
List of shipwrecks: 11 October 1926
Ship	State	Description
Urania	Sweden	The sailing ship sprang a leak and was abandoned in the Baltic Sea. Her crew were rescued by Hornung (Germany).

=== 13 October ===
List of shipwrecks: 13 October 1926
Ship	State	Description
Rosandra	Italy	The cargo ship caught fire at Port Said, Egypt and was scuttled. She was refloated on 22 October.

=== 14 October ===
List of shipwrecks: 14 October 1926
Ship	State	Description
Goodwin	United Kingdom	The cargo ship ran aground at Passage East, County Waterford, Ireland. She was refloated on 19 October.
Navegador	Portugal	The sailing ship was destroyed by fire in the Atlantic Ocean 6 nautical miles (11 km) off Angra do Heroísmo, Azores.

=== 16 October ===
List of shipwrecks: 16 October 1926
Ship	State	Description
Guide	United Kingdom	The coaster capsized and sank in the St. Lawrence River near Godbout, Quebec, Canada with the loss of 11 of the 16 people aboard.
Katharine Park	United Kingdom	The cargo ship collided with another vessel in the English Channel and was beached on the Goodwin Sands, Kent. She was refloated on 18 October.
Three unknown steam launches	unknown	The steam launches were sunk when Taisoku Maru (Japan) steered wide and collided with them and a wharf at Kosichang in the Bangkok River.
Vera	Denmark	The cargo ship collided with Caledonia (Netherlands) in the North Sea off Brunsbüttelkoog, Schleswig-Holstein, Germany and was beached.

=== 18 October ===
List of shipwrecks: 18 October 1926
Ship	State	Description
Angelo Viglienzoni	Italy	The cargo ship caught fire in the Gulf of La Spezia and sank. Her crew were rescued.

=== 21 October ===
List of shipwrecks: 21 October 1926
Ship	State	Description
Kemmel	United Kingdom	The cargo ship ran aground in the Paraná River at San Nicolás de Arroyos, Argentina. She was refloated on 26 October.

=== 22 October ===
List of shipwrecks: 22 October 1926
Ship	State	Description
Biscayne	Cuba	The tug foundered at Havana during a hurricane.
Eastway	United Kingdom	The cargo ship foundered in the Atlantic Ocean off Bermuda with the loss of 21 of her 33 crew. Survivors were rescued by Luciline (United Kingdom).
Marianne	Germany	The auxiliary sailing vessel collided with Corcrest (United Kingdom) in the North Sea off Glückstadt, Schleswig-Holstein and sank.
HMS Valerian	Royal Navy	HMS Valerian The Arabis-class sloop-of-war foundered in the Atlantic Ocean 18 nautical miles (33 km) south of Bermuda with the loss of most of her crew. Twenty survivors were rescued by the light cruiser HMS Capetown (Royal Navy).

=== 23 October ===
List of shipwrecks: 23 October 1926
Ship	State	Description
Golden Hind	United Kingdom	The schooner was wrecked in Bay le Moine, Newfoundland.

=== 24 October ===
List of shipwrecks: 24 October 1926
Ship	State	Description
Bessie	United States	After her gasoline engine backfired 0.75 nautical miles (1.4 km; 0.9 mi) off Wards Cove Cannery in Southeast Alaska and started a fire that burned out of control, the 8-ton fishing vessel burned to the waterline and drifted ashore at Wacker City, Territory of Alaska. Her crew of two survived, but she was declared a total loss/
Falcon	United Kingdom	The cargo ship caught fire in the English Channel and was abandoned 4 nautical miles (7.4 km) south west of the North Goodwin Lightship (United Kingdom). Her crew were rescued by Elswick House (United Kingdom). Falcon was taken in tow by Lady Brassey (United Kingdom). The tow rope burnt through and she came ashore at Langdon Cliffs, Kent. She broke up on 5 November and was a total loss.

=== 25 October ===
List of shipwrecks: 25 October 1926
Ship	State	Description
Abaco Bahamas	United Kingdom	The schooner came ashore at Abaco, Bahamas and was wrecked.
Elsa Kürlke	Germany	The auxiliary schooner came ashore in Bideford Bay and was wrecked. Her crew were rescued.
Nelson Y. McFarlane	United Kingdom	The schooner foundered in the Bay of Fundy off Grand Manan Island, New Brunswick, Canada with the loss of all four people aboard.
Rio Silvo	Spain	The schooner was driven ashore and wrecked at Salavar, Andalusia.
Sigrid	Latvia	The cargo ship was driven ashore at Domesnes, Norway and was wrecked.

=== 26 October ===
List of shipwrecks: 26 October 1926
Ship	State	Description
Perceveranca	Portugal	The sailing ship was driven ashore in Marajo Bay and was a total loss.

=== 27 October ===
List of shipwrecks: 27 October 1926
Ship	State	Description
Fredensbro	Denmark	The cargo ship collided with Manchester Spinner (United Kingdom in the Delaware River and sank.
William Melbourne	United Kingdom	The schooner was dismasted off Yarmouth, Nova Scotia, Canada and was abandoned by her crew. She came ashore at Cape Chignecto and was a total loss.

=== 28 October ===
List of shipwrecks: 28 October 1926
Ship	State	Description
Louisiana	United States	The cargo ship collided with Madison (United States) off the mouth of the Mississippi River and sank.
Roam	United Kingdom	The coaster foundered in the English Channel off the Goodwin Sands, Kent. Four of her five crew were rescued by a fishing boat.

=== 29 October ===
List of shipwrecks: 29 October 1926
Ship	State	Description
Everett	United States	The ship was destroyed by fire at San Francisco, California.
Riccardo Hernandez	Spain	The auxiliary sailing ship was wrecked during a hurricane at Havana, Cuba.
Torhamvan	United Kingdom	The cargo ship came ashore at Ferryland, Newfoundland and was a total loss. Her crew survived.

=== 30 October ===
List of shipwrecks: 30 October 1926
Ship	State	Description
Ethelaric	United Kingdom	The cargo ship ran aground on Ship Shoal Island, Virginia, United States. She was refloated on 5 November.

=== 31 October ===
List of shipwrecks: 31 October 1926
Ship	State	Description
Giuseppe Garibaldi	Soviet Union	The cargo ship collided with Vogtland (Germany) near Blankensee, Western Pomerania and was beached. The wreck was broken up in Hamburg, Germany.
Torpoint	United Kingdom	The cargo ship caught fire and was abandoned in the Atlantic Ocean (49°20′N 8°18′W). Her crew were rescued by Oscar Gorthon (Sweden). Torpoint was taken in tow by Iroise (France), arriving at Brest, Finistère, France on 2 November.

== November ==
=== 1 November ===
List of shipwrecks: 1 November 1926
Ship	State	Description
Orla	Germany	The cargo ship ran aground at Vidskär, Finland. She was refloated but found to be severely damaged and was beached at Oitkapaasi.
HMS R4	Royal Navy	The R-class submarine ran aground at Exmouth, Devon. She was refloated 10½ hours later.
Saranac	United Kingdom	The cargo ship ran aground off Port Eads, Louisiana, United States. She was refloated on 10 November.
Sheikh Berkhud	United Kingdom	The cargo ship caught fire in the Mediterranean Sea and was abandoned. Her crew were rescued by Tirpitz (Germany).

=== 2 November ===
List of shipwrecks: 2 November 1926
Ship	State	Description
Maria Couroupou	Greece	The cargo ship ran aground at Cape Kephalo, Imbros and was a total loss.

=== 3 November ===
List of shipwrecks: 3 November 1926
Ship	State	Description
Solana	United States	The tanker ran aground north of Arguello Point, California, United States. She was refloated on 8 November.

=== 4 November ===
List of shipwrecks: 4 November 1926
Ship	State	Description
Draa	France	The cargo ship ran aground off the coast of Saloum. She was refloated on 8 November.

=== 6 November ===
List of shipwrecks: 6 November 1926
Ship	State	Description
Ishikari Maru	Japan	The cargo ship was destroyed caught fire and sank off Nojima. Her crew survived.

=== 7 November ===
List of shipwrecks: 7 November 1926
Ship	State	Description
Casper	United States	The cargo ship ran aground in South Kvarken. She was refloated on 13 November.
Jølund	Norway	The cargo ship ran aground on Ed dom esh Sheikh Island, Sudan. She was refloated on 12 November.

=== 9 November ===
List of shipwrecks: 9 November 1926
Ship	State	Description
Venus	Denmark	The cargo ship ran aground on Gogland, Soviet Union. She was refloated on 12 November.

=== 10 November ===
List of shipwrecks: 10 November 1926
Ship	State	Description
Atlanta	United States	The cargo ship was damaged by fire at Houghton, Washington.
Bremerton	United States	The cargo ship was destroyed by fire at Houghton.
Dart	United States	The cargo ship was destroyed by fire at Houghton.
Reliance	United States	The cargo ship was destroyed by fire at Houghton.

=== 11 November ===
List of shipwrecks: 11 November 1926
Ship	State	Description
J. K. Mitchell	United States	The three-masted schooner capsized off Cape Mongoun, Haiti. She was later towed into Aquin.
Stjernø	Norway	The three-masted schooner was abandoned in Saundersfoot Bay. All seven crew were rescued. She was reboarded the next day.

=== 12 November ===
List of shipwrecks: 12 November 1926
Ship	State	Description
Brando	Finland	The auxiliary four-masted schooner came ashore at Utö and was wrecked. Her crew survived.
Frances E. Moulton	United Kingdom	The schooner was driven ashore at Cape Ray, Newfoundland and was wrecked.

=== 13 November ===
List of shipwrecks: 13 November 1926
Ship	State	Description
Homewood	United Kingdom	The cargo ship was abandoned 1 nautical mile (1.9 km) off the Mull of Galloway, Ayrshire. Her crew were rescued by the Portlogan and Portpatrick Lifeboats.
Perdreau	France	The cargo ship was driven ashore at Nieuwe Diep, Netherlands. Her crew were rescued. Salvage efforts were abandoned on 15 November.

=== 14 November ===
List of shipwrecks: 14 November 1926
Ship	State	Description
Procida	Italy	The cargo ship ran aground at Gedser, Denmark. She was refloated on 17 November.

=== 15 November ===
List of shipwrecks: 15 November 1926
Ship	State	Description
Namesco	France	The cargo ship ran aground at Escullos, Andalusia, Spain. She broke in two and was a total loss.

=== 16 November ===
List of shipwrecks: 16 November 1926
Ship	State	Description
Ardmore	United Kingdom	The cargo ship struck a submerged object off Strumble Head, Pembrokeshire. She was holed and was consequently beached at Goodwick Sands.
Braga	France	The cargo ship ran aground at Aspra, Sicily, Italy. She was still aground on 22 November.
Duva	United Kingdom	The cargo ship was driven ashore, capsized and sank 50 nautical miles (93 km) south east of Aberdeen. Her crew were rescued.
Leroy	United States	The tugboat sprang a leak off Panama City, Florida and sank.
Prospector	United Kingdom	The schooner was driven ashore at Shepherd's Point, Catalina, Newfoundland and was wrecked.

=== 17 November ===
List of shipwrecks: 17 November 1926
Ship	State	Description
Cranstone	United Kingdom	The cargo ship caught fore off the Isle of Wight. She was subsequently beached at The Mumbles, Glamorgan. Cranstone was on a voyage from Hamburg, Germany to Liverpool, Lancashire. She was refloated on 24 December.
Hochelaga	United Kingdom	The collier collided with Leopold L D (France) at Traverse, Quebec, Canada and was beached.

=== 18 November ===
List of shipwrecks: 18 November 1926
Ship	State	Description
Corozal	United States	The dredger struck a submerged object and sank in the Miami Channel.
Mareado Cen	Portugal	The schooner was abandoned in the Atlantic Ocean (39°50′N 9°09′W). She was set afire by her crew, who were rescued by Sheaf Brook (United Kingdom).

=== 19 November ===
List of shipwrecks: 19 November 1926
Ship	State	Description
Montreal	United Kingdom	The cargo ship was destroyed by fire at Sorel, Quebec, Canada with the loss of five crew.

=== 20 November ===
List of shipwrecks: 20 November 1926
Ship	State	Description
Andrios	Greece	The cargo ship struck rocks and sank off The Burlings.
Frontier I	Union of South Africa	The steamship was wrecked on the coast of Transkei.
Pedro 2	Brazil	The cargo ship ran aground at Itapoan and was abandoned.
Pena Rocias	Spain	The cargo ship ran aground at Ayamonte, Huelva. She was refloated on 24 November.

=== 21 November ===
List of shipwrecks: 21 November 1926
Ship	State	Description
Bahada	United States	The tug sank between Anacortes, Washington and Bellingham, Washington in 250 feet (76 m) of water, lost with all nine hands.

=== 25 November ===
List of shipwrecks: 25 November 1926
Ship	State	Description
Coronado	United States	The cargo ship ran aground off Port Eads, Louisiana. She was refloated on 28 November.
Faneromeni	Greece	The cargo ship ran aground at Alexandria, Egypt and was a total loss.
Nystrand	Norway	The cargo ship came ashore on the south coast of Iceland and was wrecked.

=== 26 November ===
List of shipwrecks: 26 November 1926
Ship	State	Description
Daryl	United Kingdom	The schooner was driven ashore at Bonavista, Newfoundland and was wrecked.
H. Houghton	United States	The cargo ship caught fire and sank in the St. Clair River.
Rose	United Kingdom	The cargo ship came ashore at Nefyn, Carmarthenshire and was abandoned by her crew.
Wittekind	Germany	The cargo ship ran aground on Ullholmen, Norway. She was refloated on 2 December.

=== 27 November ===
List of shipwrecks: 27 November 1926
Ship	State	Description
Axenfels	Germany	The cargo ship struck the wreck of Alps Maru (Japan) in the Scheldt and was beached.
Ayrshire	United Kingdom	The ocean liner caught fire in the Indian Ocean (8°00′N 73°45′E). She was taken in tow by HMS Lupin (Royal Navy), but was later scuttled (9°12′N 73°28′E).
Seminole	United States	The dredger was destroyed by fire at Tampa, Florida. She was refloated on 30 November.

=== 28 November ===
List of shipwrecks: 28 November 1926
Ship	State	Description
Wolsum	Netherlands	The cargo ship ran aground west of Quebec City, Canada. She was refloated on 1 December.

=== 29 November ===
List of shipwrecks: 29 November 1926
Ship	State	Description
Herman H. Hettler	United States	The cargo ship ran aground on Grand Island, Michigan. She broke up and was a total loss.
Roshejen	(Denmark) Faroe Islands	The auxiliary schooner foundered in the North Sea 50 nautical miles (93 km) south west of Noup Head, Westray, Orkney Islands, United Kingdom. Her crew survived.
Union Jack	United Kingdom	The schooner came ashore in the Penguin Islands, Dominion of Newfoundland and was a total loss. Her crew survived.

=== 30 November ===
List of shipwrecks: 30 November 1926
Ship	State	Description
Acton Manor	United Kingdom	The cargo ship arrived at Dublin, Ireland on fire and was beached. She was refloated on 6 December.
Andre Thome	France	The cargo ship caught fire at Dublin, Ireland and sank. She was refloated on 3 December.
City of Bangor	United States	The cargo ship was stranded on Keweenaw Point, Michigan. Her crew were rescued and her cargo was salvaged. She was scrapped in situ in 1942.

== December ==
=== 1 December ===
List of shipwrecks: 1 December 1926
Ship	State	Description
Henzaleh	Egypt	The paddle steamer sank at Port Said.
Kumeric	United Kingdom	The cargo ship collided with Normanstar (United Kingdom) in the Paraná River at Punta Indio, Argentina and was beached. She was refloated on 20 December and found to be severely damaged.

=== 2 December ===
List of shipwrecks: 2 December 1926
Ship	State	Description
Totila	Germany	The cargo ship was driven ashore on Green Island, Newfoundland and was wrecked.

=== 3 December ===
List of shipwrecks: 3 December 1926
Ship	State	Description
Palatka	United States	The vessel sank above Mandarin Point Light. Three crewmen killed.
Thomas Maytham	United States	The cargo ship came ashore at Keweenaw Point, Michigan. Her crew were taken off the Eagle Harbor Coastguard.

=== 4 December ===
List of shipwrecks: 4 December 1926
Ship	State	Description
Ella and Norman	United Kingdom	The Thames barge collided with Batavier III (Netherlands) in the River Thames at Gravesend, Kent and sank. She was later refloated.
Gunther Zelck	Germany	The cargo ship caught fire at Dublin, Ireland and was beached.

=== 5 December ===
List of shipwrecks: 5 December 1926
Ship	State	Description
Edna Louise	United Kingdom	The schooner ran aground at Stickley's Point, Newfoundland. She was refloated and towed to Port Union, where she sank.
Erna	Germany	The sailing ship collided with Moto (United Kingdom) in the North Sea off Brunshausen, Germany and sank.

=== 6 December ===
List of shipwrecks: 6 December 1926
Ship	State	Description
A. F. Davison	Unknown	Carrying a cargo of spruce pilings from Saint John, New Brunswick, Canada, to New York City, the 503-gross register ton four-masted schooner was driven ashore and wrecked on the north side of White Head Island in the Bay of Fundy during a gale.
Becka	United Kingdom	The tanker suffered and explosion aboard and fire at Málaga, Spain with the loss of a crew member. She was a total loss.
Inverdon	United Kingdom	The 125.7-foot (38.3 m), 278-ton steam trawler, a former Castle-class naval trawler, was wrecked on a reef near Kvalnes, Sando, Faeroe Islands.
Southead	United Kingdom	The schooner was wrecked at Halifax, Nova Scotia, Canada.

=== 7 December ===
List of shipwrecks: 7 December 1926
Ship	State	Description
Edna M. McKnight	United States	The schooner was dismasted in the Atlantic Ocean (35°53′N 72°40′W) and was abandoned. Her crew were rescued by Radnor (United Kingdom).
W. N. Reindardt	United Kingdom	The schooner came ashore at Cape Cod, Massachusetts, United States and was wrecked.

=== 8 December ===
List of shipwrecks: 8 December 1926
Ship	State	Description
J. L. Reiss	United States	The cargo ship sank at Sheboygan, Wisconsin. She was refloated on 10 December.
Nils Gorthon	Sweden	The cargo ship suffered an explosion aboard and fire at Dublin, Ireland and was beached. She was refloated on 10 December.

=== 9 December ===
List of shipwrecks: 9 December 1926
Ship	State	Description
Islendingur	Iceland	The 101.5-foot (30.9 m) steam trawler sank at winter moorings at Eioisvik, Reykjavík, Iceland. Salvaged and converted to a motor vessel, unknown date.
Sac City	United States	The design 1022 cargo ship ran aground in the Scheldt at Walsoorden, Netherlands. She was refloated on 16 December.
Tsuchi Maru	Japan	The cargo ship collided with an Imperial Japanese Navy warship in the Inland Sea of Japan and sank. All her crew were rescued.

=== 10 December ===
List of shipwrecks: 10 December 1926
Ship	State	Description
Yandiola	Spain	The cargo ship ran aground at Pravia. She was refloated on 14 December.

=== 11 December ===
List of shipwrecks: 11 December 1926
Ship	State	Description
Crispi	Italy	The cargo ship ran aground at Pasaloutre, Louisiana, United States. She was refloated on 20 December.

=== 12 December ===
List of shipwrecks: 12 December 1926
Ship	State	Description
Agwisun	United States	The cargo ship suffered an explosion aboard, broke in two and sank at New York.
Lien Shing	United Kingdom	The passenger ship ran aground on the Amherst Rocks at the mouth of the Yangtze, China and sank with the loss of 40 lives. American author Cora Sutton Castle was among the survivors.

=== 13 December ===
List of shipwrecks: 13 December 1926
Ship	State	Description
Arauco	Chilean Navy	The transport ship foundered at Lota with the loss of 67 of her 96 crew.
Hanna	Sweden	The schooner came ashore at Trelleborg. Her crew were rescued.
Mab	United Kingdom	The schooner came ashore at Portugal Cove, Newfoundland and was wrecked.
Tensho Maru	Japan	The cargo ship foundered in the South China Sea. Her crew were rescued.

=== 14 December ===
List of shipwrecks: 14 December 1926
Ship	State	Description
Nessie C	United Kingdom	The schooner was dismasted and abandoned in the Atlantic Ocean 90 nautical miles (170 km) off Sable Island, Nova Scotia, Canada. She was towed in to Gloucester, Massachusetts.

=== 15 December ===
List of shipwrecks: 15 December 1926
Ship	State	Description
Asiatic Prince	United Kingdom	The cargo ship ran aground off Cabilao Island, Philippines. She was refloated on 4 January 1927.
Eddie James	United Kingdom	The schooner was destroyed by fire at Halifax, Nova Scotia, Canada.
Elsa	Sweden	The cargo ship foundered in the North Sea. Her crew were rescued by a Swedish fishing vessel.
Oceanic	United States	With no one aboard, the 11-gross register ton motor vessel broke loose from her moorings and was wrecked at Metlakatla, Territory of Alaska.
Reliance	United States	During a voyage in Southeast Alaska from Juneau to Petersburg, the 11-gross register ton, 38.7-foot (11.8 m) motor vessel sank in Taku Inlet opposite Point Bishop (58°12′10″N 134°08′45″W) after her overheated gasoline engine ignited gasoline fumes in her cabin, causing an explosion that wrecked her. Her two-man crew escaped in a skiff to Green Cove on Admiralty Island in the Alexander Archipelago, where the cutter USCGC Unalga ( United States Coast Guard) rescued them.

=== 17 December ===
List of shipwrecks: 17 December 1926
Ship	State	Description
Eufrosine	Latvia	The three-masted schooner was abandoned in the Atlantic Ocean (39°56′N 13°15′W). Her crew were rescued by Highland Prince (United Kingdom).
John Brinckman	Germany	The cargo ship foundered off Cape Arkona, Rügen, Western Pomerania. Her crew were rescued by Hispania (Sweden).
Toco	United Kingdom	The tanker reported that she expected to arrive at Tsurumi, Japan on 20 December. No further trace, presumed foundered with the loss of all hands.

=== 18 December ===
List of shipwrecks: 18 December 1926
Ship	State	Description
Guaneri	Italy	The sailing ship was dismasted and abandoned in the Atlantic Ocean (37°31′N 15°47′W). Her crew were rescued by Roma (Italy).
Lyd	Isle of Man	The coaster was driven ashore and sank at Whalsay, Shetland Islands.
Swiks	Sweden	The schooner was wrecked on the coast of Öland, Sweden, during a storm; the wreck is still there, beached at Trollskogen.

=== 22 December ===
List of shipwrecks: 22 December 1926
Ship	State	Description
Islington	United Kingdom	The cargo ship collided with Shahristan (United Kingdom) in the River Thames at Northfleet, Kent and foundered.
Unkai Maru No.6	Japan	The cargo ship ran aground on Wakamatsu Island. She was refloated on 25 December.

=== 24 December ===
List of shipwrecks: 24 December 1926
Ship	State	Description
Mistley	United Kingdom	The cargo ship was abandoned in the English Channel off the Goodwin Sands, Kent. Her crew were rescued by the Deal Lifeboat. She came ashore south of Deal.
HMS Thunderer	Royal Navy	The Orion-class battleship ran aground at Blyth, Northumberland whilst being towed into port for scrapping. She was refloated on 30 December and towed to the Firth of Forth as her draught was too deep to allow her to enter Blyth.

=== 26 December ===
List of shipwrecks: 26 December 1926
Ship	State	Description
Franconia	United Kingdom	The ocean liner ran aground at San Juan, Puerto Rico. She was refloated on 29 December.
Guiding Star	United Kingdom	The schooner ran aground at Llanthystyd, Carmarthenshire and was a total loss.
Priscilla	United Kingdom	The auxiliary schooner was destroyed by fire at Skibbereen, County Cork, Ireland.
Ribbledale	United Kingdom	The cargo ship was wrecked Litaquerel Point, Bouley Bay, Jersey Channel Islands when en route from London for Jersey in ballast.

=== 27 December ===
List of shipwrecks: 27 December 1926
Ship	State	Description
Elise Schulte	Germany	The cargo ship ran aground on Melstenen, Norway. Her crew were taken off the next day and she was a total loss.
España	Spain	The dredger foundered in a gale at Valencia.
Eugene Schneider	France	The barque collided with Burutu (United Kingdom) in the English Channel south of the Isle of Wight and sank with the loss of 24 of her 28 crew. The survivors were rescued by Burutu.
Gaston	United States	The cargo ship struck a submerged object and was beached at College Point, Florida.
Hilda	United Kingdom	The Thames barge collided with Edenwood (United Kingdom) in the River Thames at Gravesend, Kent and sank. Her crew were rescued.
Walter Holken	Germany	The cargo ship sank in the Gulf of Finland off Seskar, Soviet Union. Her crew were rescued.

=== 28 December ===
List of shipwrecks: 28 December 1926
Ship	State	Description
Saint Joseph	France	The cargo ship ran aground at Isla Verde, Puerto Rico. She was refloated on 3 January 1927.

=== 31 December ===
List of shipwrecks: 31 December 1926
Ship	State	Description
Andreas	United Kingdom	Tugboats and a floating crane attend the sunken Andreas (left) on 11 January 2927, after she struck the wreck of Alps Maru (right) The cargo ship struck the wreck of Alps Maru (Japan) in the Scheldt and remained fast. She broke in tow and sank on 2 January 1927 and was a total loss.
Westmoreland	United Kingdom	The Thames barge collided with another vessel in the River Thames at Rotherhithe, London and sank.

== Unknown date ==
List of shipwrecks: Unknown date 1926
Ship	State	Description
America	United States	The passenger and package delivery steamer collided with another steamer on the Great Lakes. She was repaired and returned to service.
HMS Eaglet	Royal Navy	The Repulse-class ship of the line was destroyed by fire.
Mary A. Gregory	United States	The retired schooner was towed from her berth in the Chicago River in Chicago, Illinois, to deep water in Lake Michigan and burned and scuttled as a means of disposal in the spring of 1926. She was the last commercial sailing vessel in Chicago.
Otranto	United Kingdom	The ocean liner suffered slight damage when she struck a rock at Cape Grosso, Greece.
Sapona	United States	Sapona, August 2009 The concrete ship came ashore at Bimini, Bahamas in a hurricane.
W. G. Mason	United States	The wooden tug was dismantled and scuttled in 13 feet (4.0 m) of water in Lake Huron near Rogers City, Michigan, at 45.41065°N 83.747217°W and abandoned.
