= Nuchek, Alaska =

Abandoned village

Coordinates: 60.3333°N 146.6553°W

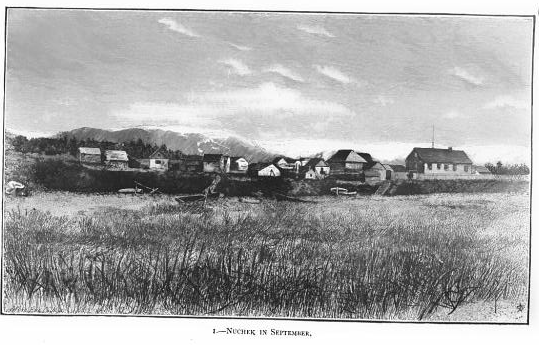
Nuchek, Alaska.

Nuchek (Núciq, Russian: Начек) is an abandoned village in the U.S. state of Alaska. It is located on Hinchinbrook Island at Port Etches bay, Prince William Sound. It is situated approximately 50 miles (80 km) to the west of the mouth of Copper River and 432 miles (695 km) west of Sitka.

== History ==
The village was located by James Cook in 1776–79 and was later used by the Alaska Commercial Company as a trading station. In 1928, after the death of Nuchek's last chief, the Alutiiq people left the village.

== Demographics ==
Historical population
Census	Pop.	Note	%±
1880	74		—
1890	145		95.9%
1900	144		−0.7%
U.S. Decennial Census

Nuchek first appeared on the 1880 U.S. Census as an unincorporated village. It reported 74 residents, of which 60 were Inuit, 11 were Creole (Mixed Russian & Native) and 3 Whites. In 1890, it reported 145 residents, of which 120 were Native, 18 were Creole and 7 Whites. It last reported on the 1900 census, but provided no racial breakdown. It has not reported since.
