= Cape Hinchinbrook Light =

Lighthouse in Alaska, United States

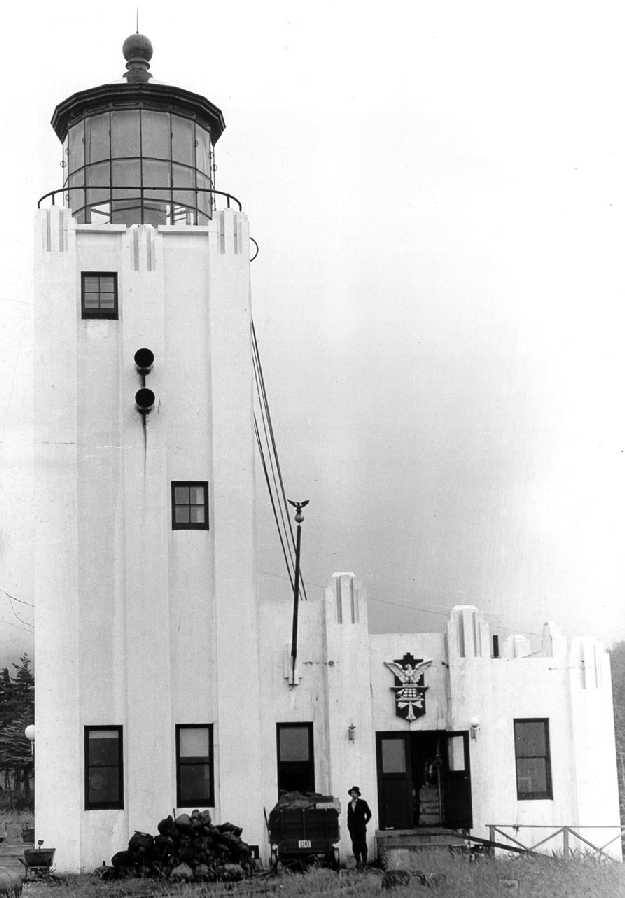
- Cape Hinchinbrook Light
- Location: Hinchinbrook Island; Prince William Sound; Alaska; United States
- Coordinates: 60°14′14″N 146°38′48″W

Tower
- Constructed: 1910 (first)
- Foundation: concrete and rock
- Construction: reinforced concrete tower
- Automated: 1974
- Height: 67 feet (20 m)
- Shape: octagonal tower with lantern
- Markings: art deco architecture white tower, black lantern
- Power source: solar power
- Operator: United States Coast Guard
- Heritage: National Register of Historic Places listed place

Light
- First lit: 1934 (current)
- Focal height: 237 feet (72 m)
- Lens: Third order Fresnel lens (original), Vega lens (current)
- Range: 19 nautical miles (35 km; 22 mi)
- Characteristic: Fl W 15s. obscured from 134° to 135° and 138° to 283° emergency light, Fl W 6s. of reduced intensity if main light is extinguished.
- Cape Hinchinbrook Light Station
- U.S. National Register of Historic Places
- U.S. Historic district
- Alaska Heritage Resources Survey
- Area: 6.9 acres (2.8 ha)
- Architects: D.A. Chase; Edwin Laird
- Architectural style: Art Deco
- MPS: Light Stations of the United States MPS
- NRHP reference No.: 05000728
- AHRS No.: COR-095
- Added to NRHP: July 29, 2005

The Cape Hinchinbrook Light is a lighthouse located near the southern end of Hinchinbrook Island adjacent to Prince William Sound, in Alaska, United States.

== History ==
Cape Hinchinbrook Lightstation, 1948

The Cape Hinchinbrook Lighthouse was first established in 1910 to mark the entrance to Prince William Sound. Congress authorized the construction of a lighthouse at this point in 1906 appropriating $125,000 for its construction. However, the full amount was not authorized in one lump sum. The money was appropriated over a number of years with $25,000 in 1906, $50,000 in 1907 and the rest in 1908. As a result, construction did not begin until 1909. In the winter of 1909 a temporary fixed white light was established on the second story of the building under construction. Due to the earthquakes in 1927 and 1928, which caused instability in the cliff around the lighthouse, it was felt a new light should be built on solid rock. The new 67-foot (20 m) octagonal tower was completed in 1934. The lighthouse was automated in 1974 and a solar-powered Vega lens was installed. The original third order Fresnel lens is on display at the Valdez Museum and Historical Archive in Valdez, Alaska.

It was listed on the National Register of Historic Places as Cape Hinchinbrook Light Station in 2005. The listing was for a historic district including two contributing buildings, three contributing structure, one contributing site, and three contributing objects.

== Climate ==
Climate data for Cape Hinchinbrook Light, Alaska
Month	Jan	Feb	Mar	Apr	May	Jun	Jul	Aug	Sep	Oct	Nov	Dec	Year
Record high °F (°C)	54 (12)	50 (10)	47 (8)	63 (17)	68 (20)	81 (27)	81 (27)	76 (24)	72 (22)	64 (18)	52 (11)	55 (13)	81 (27)
Mean daily maximum °F (°C)	33.3 (0.7)	35.4 (1.9)	36.1 (2.3)	41.3 (5.2)	47.4 (8.6)	54.7 (12.6)	58.3 (14.6)	58.4 (14.7)	53.9 (12.2)	45.8 (7.7)	39.6 (4.2)	35.3 (1.8)	45.0 (7.2)
Daily mean °F (°C)	29.8 (−1.2)	32.1 (0.1)	32.3 (0.2)	37.5 (3.1)	43.4 (6.3)	50.1 (10.1)	54.3 (12.4)	54.8 (12.7)	50.2 (10.1)	42.2 (5.7)	36.3 (2.4)	32.0 (0.0)	41.3 (5.2)
Mean daily minimum °F (°C)	26.2 (−3.2)	28.7 (−1.8)	28.5 (−1.9)	33.6 (0.9)	39.3 (4.1)	45.4 (7.4)	50.3 (10.2)	51.1 (10.6)	46.5 (8.1)	38.5 (3.6)	33.0 (0.6)	28.6 (−1.9)	37.5 (3.1)
Record low °F (°C)	−2 (−19)	1 (−17)	4 (−16)	18 (−8)	22 (−6)	22 (−6)	36 (2)	40 (4)	30 (−1)	24 (−4)	8 (−13)	1 (−17)	−2 (−19)
Average precipitation inches (mm)	5.65 (144)	5.46 (139)	4.50 (114)	6.31 (160)	8.40 (213)	4.56 (116)	7.70 (196)	9.12 (232)	12.86 (327)	11.37 (289)	7.37 (187)	8.36 (212)	91.66 (2,329)
Average snowfall inches (cm)	16.9 (43)	18.9 (48)	18.4 (47)	9.7 (25)	0.5 (1.3)	0.0 (0.0)	0.0 (0.0)	0.0 (0.0)	0.0 (0.0)	3.7 (9.4)	9.5 (24)	16.0 (41)	93.6 (238.7)

== See also ==
- List of lighthouses in the United States
- National Register of Historic Places listings in Chugach Census Area, Alaska
