= Hinchinbrook Island (Alaska) =

Island in the United States

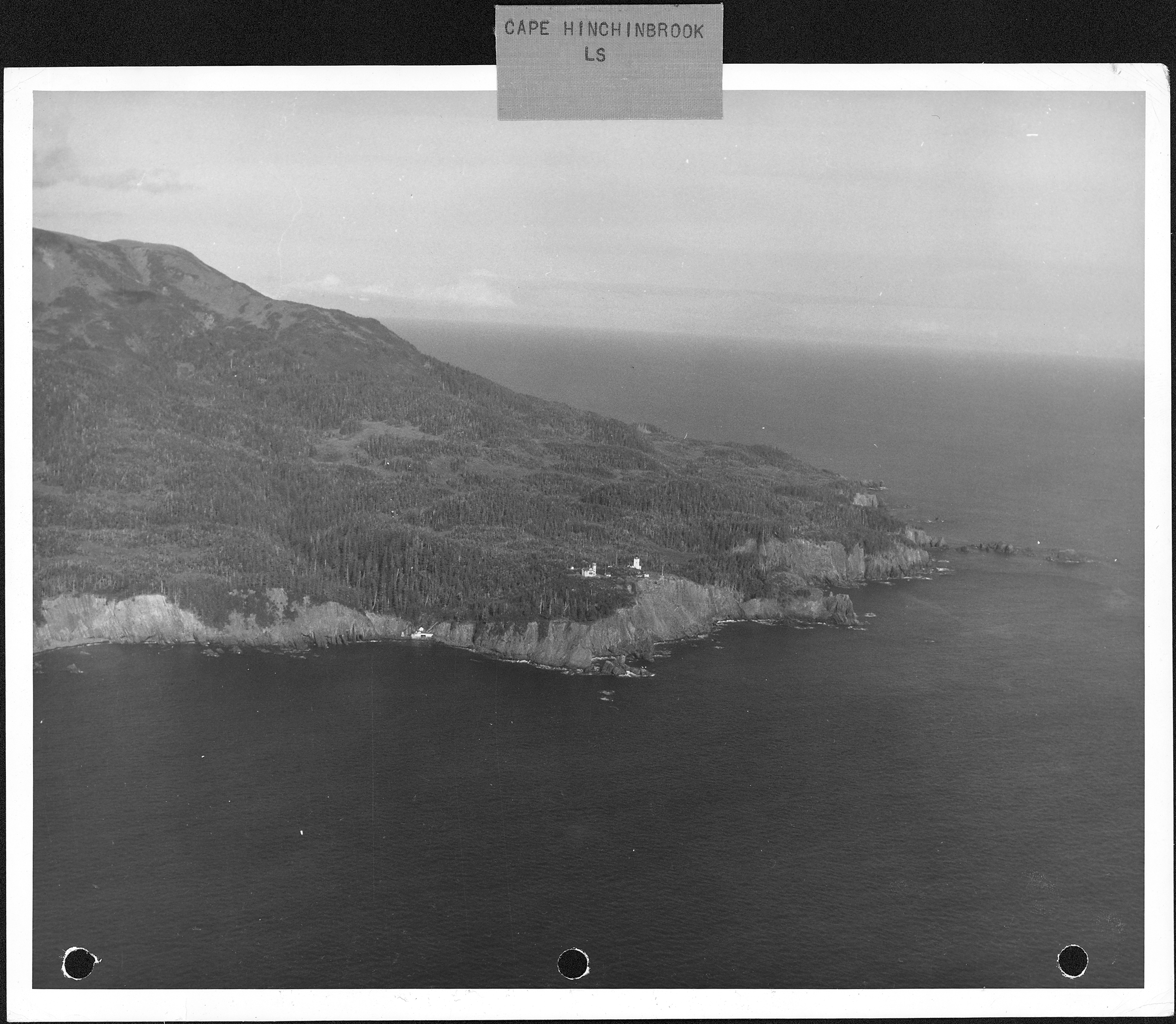
Old photo of the Cape Hinchinbrook, Alaska

Hinchinbrook Island (Russian: Хинчинбрук) is an island in the Gulf of Alaska lying at the entrance to Prince William Sound in the state of Alaska, United States. The island has a land area of 171.98 sq mi (445.438 km²), making it the 37th largest island in the United States. There was a population of five permanent residents as of the 2000 census.

Cape Hinchinbrook Light is located on the southwest side of the island. Also on the southwest side is the abandoned village of Nuchek on Port Etches (bay). The Chugach Alaska Corporation now runs the Nuuciq Spirit Camp at this site.

During the Cold War, a US Government White Alice radar site was located on the northeast corner of the island. This site is now abandoned, and all that remains is a trail to the former antenna site on a small hill to the southwest and several of the buildings. Nearby Boswell Bay Airport is the landing strip that formerly served this site. A few houses comprise the hamlet of Boswell Bay across the bay to the south. The State of Alaska maintains Boswell Bay Marine State Park nearby on Boswell Bay.

In 1792, a battle occurred on Hinchinbrook Island between Yakutat Tlingit and a group of Russians and Kodiak Sugpiaq led by Alexander Baranov. The Tlingit had likely come to the island seeking retribution after the Chugach Sugpiaq had raided them the previous year.

In 1797, Baranov visited Fort Konstantinovsk, built by the Lebedev-Lastochkin Company, on the island he called Nuchek Island. Most of these men joined his Shelikhov-Golikov Company.

In the middle of May 1912, the 1,502 ton United States Lighthouse Service Tender Armeria became stranded on the rocks near Cape Hinchinbrook. She was attempting to rescue the barge Haydn Brown but ended up a casualty herself. The crew of 36 were rescued by the steamer Admiral Sampson. The vessel, valued at $344,000, became a total loss. Some of the $70,000 cargo of coal, buoys and supplies for area lighthouses was salvaged.

== Climate ==
Hinchinbrook Island has a humid continental climate (Köppen: Dfb) closely bordering on a subpolar oceanic climate (Cfc). Because of its location in the Gulf of Alaska, the climate here is greatly influenced by the ocean. Although it is located at 60°N latitude, due to the influence of the Alaska warm current, the year-round temperature of the island is much warmer than that of inland Alaska. Among them, the average annual temperature of the island is 41.2 °F (5.1 °C). There are 4 months in a year where the average temperature exceeds 50 °F (10 °C), and only one month the average temperature is below 32 °F (0 °C) (freezing point). During the summer, the average day's temperature ranges from 50–58 °F (10–14 °C), and it is very rare to exceed 70 °F (21 °C). Temperature extremes ranged from −15 °F (−26 °C) on March 26, 1963 to 81 °F (27 °C) on June 15, 1963.

Climate data for Cape Hinchinbrook Light, Alaska
Month	Jan	Feb	Mar	Apr	May	Jun	Jul	Aug	Sep	Oct	Nov	Dec	Year
Record high °F (°C)	54 (12)	50 (10)	47 (8)	63 (17)	68 (20)	81 (27)	81 (27)	76 (24)	72 (22)	64 (18)	52 (11)	55 (13)	81 (27)
Mean maximum °F (°C)	42.6 (5.9)	42.7 (5.9)	43.2 (6.2)	50.5 (10.3)	58.0 (14.4)	65.0 (18.3)	69.6 (20.9)	67.2 (19.6)	60.9 (16.1)	54.1 (12.3)	46.6 (8.1)	43.2 (6.2)	71.9 (22.2)
Mean daily maximum °F (°C)	33.3 (0.7)	35.4 (1.9)	36.1 (2.3)	41.3 (5.2)	47.4 (8.6)	54.7 (12.6)	58.3 (14.6)	58.4 (14.7)	53.9 (12.2)	45.8 (7.7)	39.6 (4.2)	35.3 (1.8)	45.0 (7.2)
Daily mean °F (°C)	29.7 (−1.3)	32.1 (0.1)	32.3 (0.2)	37.4 (3.0)	43.3 (6.3)	50.1 (10.1)	54.2 (12.3)	54.7 (12.6)	50.2 (10.1)	42.2 (5.7)	36.3 (2.4)	32.0 (0.0)	41.2 (5.1)
Mean daily minimum °F (°C)	26.2 (−3.2)	28.7 (−1.8)	28.5 (−1.9)	33.6 (0.9)	39.3 (4.1)	45.4 (7.4)	50.3 (10.2)	51.1 (10.6)	46.5 (8.1)	38.5 (3.6)	33.0 (0.6)	28.6 (−1.9)	37.5 (3.1)
Mean minimum °F (°C)	13.2 (−10.4)	18.0 (−7.8)	17.8 (−7.9)	27.2 (−2.7)	32.9 (0.5)	39.0 (3.9)	44.7 (7.1)	45.9 (7.7)	40.0 (4.4)	31.0 (−0.6)	22.7 (−5.2)	17.5 (−8.1)	9.9 (−12.3)
Record low °F (°C)	−2 (−19)	1 (−17)	−15 (−26)	13 (−11)	22 (−6)	21 (−6)	36 (2)	40 (4)	30 (−1)	24 (−4)	8 (−13)	1 (−17)	−15 (−26)
Average precipitation inches (mm)	5.65 (144)	5.46 (139)	4.50 (114)	6.31 (160)	8.40 (213)	4.56 (116)	7.70 (196)	9.12 (232)	12.86 (327)	11.37 (289)	7.37 (187)	8.36 (212)	91.66 (2,328)
Average snowfall inches (cm)	16.9 (43)	18.9 (48)	18.4 (47)	9.7 (25)	0.5 (1.3)	0.0 (0.0)	0.0 (0.0)	0.0 (0.0)	0.0 (0.0)	3.7 (9.4)	9.5 (24)	16.0 (41)	93.7 (238)
Source: WRCC
