= MV Asiatic Prince =

History

United Kingdom
- Name: Asiatic Prince
- Operator: Rio Cape Line
- Port of registry: London
- Builder: Deutsche Werft
- Yard number: 93
- Launched: 27 January 1926
- Completed: April 1926
- Identification: UK official number 148744; code letters KTWC
- Fate: Lost without trace, March 1928

General characteristics
- Tonnage: 6,734 GRT, 3,656 NRT
- Length: 441.7 ft (134.6 m)
- Beam: 60.0 ft (18.3 m)
- Draught: 27 ft 6 1/4 in (8.39 m)
- Depth: 29.1 ft (8.9 m)
- Installed power: 1,313 NHP
- Propulsion: AEG Diesel engines, twin screws
- Speed: 15 knots (28 km/h)
- Crew: 48
- Notes: sister ships: Chinese Prince, Javanese Prince, Malayan Prince

MV Asiatic Prince was a motor cargo liner that was built in Germany in 1926, operated by a British shipping line, and disappeared without trace in the Pacific Ocean in 1928. When she was lost she was carrying silver bullion worth £263,000.

== Building ==
In 1926, Deutsche Werft built four sister ships for Rio Cape Line, which was a subsidiary of Furness, Withy. At about 6,700 GRT each and capable of 15 knots (28 km/h) they were large and fast for their era. Each ship had twin screws, driven by a pair of AEG eight-cylinder, four-stroke, single-acting Diesel engines. The combined power of the two engines was rated at 1,313 NHP. They were primarily cargo ships, but they had some passenger berths.

Rio Cape Line ships were managed by another Furness, Withy subsidiary, Prince Line, so the four ships were named Asiatic Prince, Chinese Prince, Javanese Prince and Malayan Prince.

== Final voyage and loss ==
On 16 March 1928 Asiatic Prince left San Pedro, Los Angeles bound for Yokohama. Her cargo included goods worth £180,000 as well as silver bullion worth £263,000. She had a complement of British and Chinese seafarers. She carried no passengers on this voyage.

On 22 March Asiatic Prince reported by wireless telegraph that she was 1,900 miles west of Los Angeles and had reduced speed due to adverse weather. On 24 March Ellerman Lines' City of Eastbourne received a faint wireless SOS message. City of Eastbourne did not get the name of the ship in distress, but the message gave a position about 200 miles northwest of Hawaii.

At the beginning of April 1928 Asiatic Prince was reported a week overdue at Yokohama. United States Navy ships then spent several days searching the ocean northwest of Honolulu but found nothing. A week later three US Navy cruisers searched the ocean around the Hawaiian Islands but also found nothing.

== Bibliography ==
- Harnack, Edwin P (1938) [1903]. All About Ships & Shipping (7th ed.). London: Faber and Faber. p. 485.
- Talbot-Booth, EC (1936). Ships and the Sea (Third ed.). London: Sampson Low, Marston & Co Ltd. p. 522.
- Wilson, RM (1956). The Big Ships. London: Cassell & Co. pp. 227, 228.
