= SS Ardmore =

SS Ardmore is the name of the following ships:

- SS Ardmore (1909), torpedoed and sunk by SM U-95 on 13 November 1917
- SS Ardmore (1920), launched in 1920 and scrapped in 1957
- SS Ardmore (1924), launched as Killiney in 1917 and renamed Ardmore in 1924, sunk by a mine in 1940

== See also ==
- Ardmore (disambiguation)
