= Port Etches =

Bay in Alaska, United States

Port Etches is a bay in the southcentral part of the U.S. state of Alaska. It is located on the west side of Hinchinbrook Island and opens onto Hinchinbrook Entrance, a strait between Hinchinbrook Island and Montague Island, connecting Prince William Sound and the Gulf of Alaska.

Port Etches was named by Captain Nathaniel Portlock in July 1787, presumedly for John Cadman Etches or Richard Cadman Etches, who with "other traders entered into a commercial partenship, under the title of the King George's Sound Company (also known as Richard Cadman Etches and Company), for carrying a fur trade from the western coast of America to China. George Dixon, who accompanied Portlock, called it "Port Rose". Russian fur traders gave it the name "Zaliv Nuchek". Its earliest known European name was "Puerto de Santiago", given on July 23, 1779, by Ignacio de Arteaga, during his exploration voyage with Juan Francisco de la Bodega y Quadra. The name commemorated Saint James, the patron saint of Spain, whose feast day falls on July 25. While the Spaniards were anchored in Port Etches they performed a formal possession ceremony. All the officers and chaplains went ashore in procession, raised a large cross while cannons and muskets fired salutes. The Te Deum was sung, followed by a litany and prayers. After a sermon was preached a formal deed of possession was drawn up and signed by the officers and chaplains. The title to Puerto de Santiago was important for years afterward, as it formed the basis of Spain's claim to sovereignty in the North Pacific up to 61°17′N.
