= Independent Spirit Award for Best Ensemble Cast in a New Scripted Series =

Annual US film award

- Awarded for: Best Ensemble Cast in a New Scripted Series
- Country: United States
- Presented by: Film Independent
- First award: 2020
- Currently held by: Chief of War (2025)
- Website: filmindependent.org

The Independent Spirit Award for Best Ensemble Cast in a New Scripted Series is one of the annual Independent Spirit Awards, presented to recognize the best in independent filmmaking.

== History ==
It was first awarded in 2020 with the BBC One/HBO series I May Destroy You being the first recipient of the award.

== Criteria ==
All series submitted for Best New Scripted Series are automatically considered for Best Ensemble Cast. Only one series is awarded each year.

== Recipients ==
=== 2020s ===
Year	Winner	Network	Nominee(s)
2020	I May Destroy You	BBC One / HBO	Michaela Coel, Paapa Essiedu, Weruche Opia, and Stephen Wight
2021	Reservation Dogs	FX on Hulu	Paulina Alexis, Funny Bone, Lane Factor, Devery Jacobs, Zahn McClarnon, Lil Mike, Sarah Podemski, and D'Pharaoh Woon-A-Tai
2022	Pachinko	Apple TV+	Soji Arai, Jin Ha, Inji Jeong, Minha Kim, Kaho Minami, Lee Minho, Steve Sanghyun Noh, Anna Sawai, Jimmi Simpson, and Yuh-jung Youn
2023	Jury Duty	Freevee	Alan Barinholtz, Susan Berger, Cassandra Blair, David Brown, Kirk Fox, Ross Kimball, Pramode Kumar, Trisha LaFache, Mekki Leeper, James Marsden, Edy Modica, Kerry O'Neill, Rashida Olayiwola, Whitney Rice, Maria Russell, Ishmel Sahid, Ben Seaward, Ron Song, and Evan Williams
2024	How to Die Alone	Hulu	Melissa DuPrey, Jaylee Hamidi, KeiLyn Durrel Jones, Arkie Kandola, Elle Lorraine, Michelle McLeod, Chris "CP" Powell, Conrad Ricamora, Natasha Rothwell, and Jocko Sims
2025	Chief of War	Apple TV+	Charlie Brumbly, Luciane Buchanan, Cliff Curtis, Brandon Finn, Moses Goods, Te Ao o Hinepehinga, Benjamin Hoetjes, Siua Ikale'o, Keala Kahuanui-Paleka, Mainei Kinimaka, Kaina Makua, Jason Momoa, Temuera Morrison, Te Kohe Tuhaka, and James Udom
