= John Young (advisor) =

British subject & advisor (c.1742–1835)

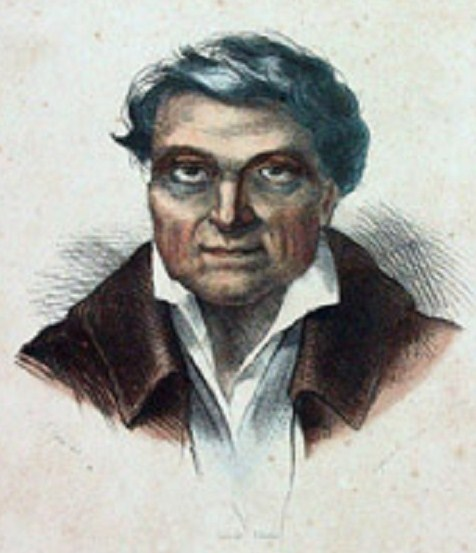

Royal Governor of Hawaiʻi
- In office 1802–1812
- Monarch: Kamehameha I
- Succeeded by: Kuakini

Personal details
- Born: c. 1742 or 17 March 1742 Crosby, England
- Died: 17 December 1835 (aged 93) Honolulu, Oahu
- Resting place: Royal Mausoleum of Hawaii
- Spouse(s): Namokuelua; Mary Kaʻōanāʻeha
- Children: Robert Young; James Kāneloa Young; Fanny Kekelaokalani; Grace Kamaʻikuʻi Young; John Kalaipaihala Young II; Jane Lahilahi Young
- Parent(s): Robert and Grace Young

John Young (c. 1742 – 17 December 1835) was a British subject who became an important military advisor to Kamehameha I during the formation of the Kingdom of Hawaii. He was left behind by Simon Metcalfe, captain of the American ship Eleanora, and along with a Welshman Isaac Davis, became a friend and advisor to Kamehameha. Young brought knowledge of naval and land battle strategies to Kamehameha, and became a strong voice on affairs of state for the Hawaiian Kingdom, playing a major role during Hawaii's first contacts with the European powers. He spent the rest of his life in Hawaiʻi. Between 1802 and 1812, Young ruled as Royal Governor of Hawaii Island while Kamehameha was away on other islands. He organized the construction of the fort at Honolulu Harbor. The Hawaiians gave him the name ʻOlohana based on Young's typical command "All hands (on deck)".

== Life ==
According to his tombstone, he was born in 1742 in Crosby, Lancashire, England. Other sources give his birth as 17 March 1744. His father was Robert Young, also from Crosby, and mother Grace. He had two brothers: Peter and James.After his death, two families from Massachusetts and Connecticut claimed that Young was American and a member of their family, but all contemporary sources seem to indicate he was British.

Young served as boatswain on the Eleanora, an American ship captained by Simon Metcalfe, engaged in the maritime fur trade between the Pacific Northwest and China. Sailing from Cape Cod in 1789, the Eleanora put in at Kealakekua Bay on the island of Hawaii in February 1790. In March, Young went ashore to investigate the disappearance of the Eleanora's companion ship, the Fair American, under Thomas Humphrey Metcalfe, and was detained because Kamehameha did not want Metcalfe to learn that his own forces had attacked her. Metcalfe waited two days, but eventually sailed without Young. It was there that he met Isaac Davis, a Welshman who was the only surviving member of Fair American's crew.

In battles such as the Battle of Nuʻuanu, when Kamehameha's army conquered Oʻahu, Young was in charge of the cannon. He is credited with firing the shot that put an end to Kaʻiana, who had seceded from the invading army en route and joined Kalanikūpule, king of Oʻahu and Maui. At the close of this contest, when Kamehameha was called back to Hawaiʻi island to suppress the rebellion of Namakeha, Young was left on Oʻahu to adjust the new regime's affairs, then with a number of foreigners who also joined Kamehameha at Hawaiʻi island. Beginning about 1800 or 1802, he was appointed as the Royal Governor of Hawaii island after chief Mokuhia, whom Kamehameha had picked, was murdered by a rival. This included his superintendency of tax gatherings when he returned to Kawaihae.

Young acted as interpreter for many English-speaking visitors, and sowed the seeds of Christianity in Hawaii. When Captain Vancouver visited the island during the Vancouver Expedition in 1793, he offered to take Young and Davis back to Britain. But they were content with their island life and refused the offer. Naturalist Archibald Menzies left seeds and plants such as citrus fruit in his care. He helped mediate a treaty with Britain in 1794, and coordinated the building of the first large European-style ships.

In 1803, Richard Cleveland, of the American ship Lelia Byrd, left a mare with foal with Young in Kawaihae. This was the first horse ever seen in the islands, and led to the establishment of Parker Ranch. He took the first horses and cattle to Honolulu in 1809.

Young lived near Kealakekua Bay probably until about 1819, when Kamehameha I died.

Young built the first European-style house on the island of Hawaiʻi, and its ruins are still at the Puʻukoholā Heiau National Historic Site near Kawaihae. It was made of stone and Young had no tools but a hatchet and a wooden trowel. He made the door with a hatchet, hewing it out of a koa tree slab. He whitewashed the house with lime made from white coral fished from the sea.

Lucy Goodale Thurston, in her story of her life as a missionary in Hawaii, described Young:

He had long been a rare example in that degenerate age, of building a hedge about his family and standing in the gap thereof. When occasion offered, he spoke with energy and decision, giving no uncertain sound, well understood by his children and by strangers. By marriage, by deeds and by counsel, he had justly risen to the eminence of a peer with the chiefs of the nation. Saxon blood flowed in his veins. He was Mr. Young, the noble grandfather of our most noble Queen Emma. His descendants all had the blood of chiefs flowing in their veins, for his wives were women of high rank.

He was one of the few close friends at Kamehameha's side when he died in 1819 at Kamakahonu.

== Family ==
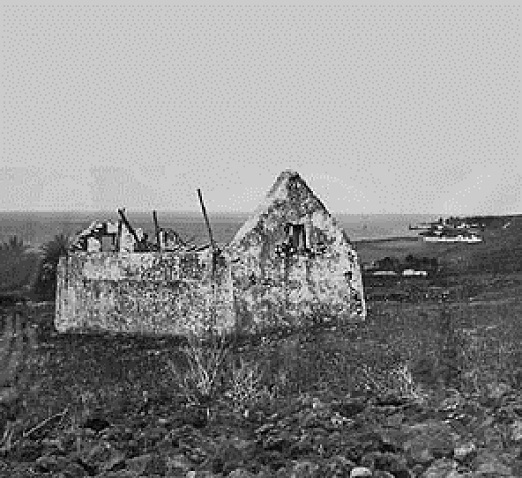
Ruins of John Young's House at Kawaihae

After the wars, Young returned to Kawaihae on the Big Island and expanded his compound, including building a small European-style fort. There he and wives raised a family and entertained both Hawaiian and western visitors.

His first marriage, in 1795, was to the chiefess Namokuelua of Oahu aristocracy. Their son, James Kānehoa, was an influential member of the court of Kamehameha II. On the king's 1823 visit to England, Kānehoa was entrusted with the official letters of introduction and served as translator. Kamehameha II, his queen and three other chiefs contracted measles and died abroad. Another son was Robert Young who was born in 1796, sent to school in America, fought for the American side in the War of 1812 and disappeared.

About 1805, Kamehameha's niece, Kaʻōanāʻeha, his favourite brother's daughter, became Young's second wife. This marriage brought him increased recognition and prestige.

Four children were born to Young's second marriage. Fanny Kekelaokalani, his eldest daughter married George Naʻea and gave birth to a daughter, Emma, who later married King Kamehameha IV. Grace Kamaʻikuʻi Young married Thomas Charles Byde Rooke and adopted her niece Emma. John Kalaipaihala Young Jr., known as Keoni Ana, married Alapai and became one of the only two men to hold the title Kuhina Nui. Jane Lahilahi Young married Joshua Kaʻeo and gave birth to Peter Kaʻeo, a member of the House of Nobles. Jane also mothered an illegitimate son by Kamehameha III, Albert Kūnuiākea, who might be the last direct descendant of Kamehameha I. His line is believed to have gone extinct.

In 1810, Young adopted his murdered companion Isaac Davis's children. They were Sally, age 13; George, 2 or 10 years old; and Betty, age 7.

=== Family tree ===
John Young (Hawaii) family tree

Keliʻimaikaʻi (died 1809) | Kalikoʻokalani | Kalaipaihala
Kaʻōanāʻeha (died 1850)
Henry C. Lewis | Fanny Kekelaokalani (1806–1880) | George Naʻea (1797–1852)
Mary Paʻaʻāina (1833–1853) | James Augustus Griswold (1823–?) | Dr. T. C. B. Rooke (1806–1858)
House of Kamehameha
Queen Emma (1836–1885) | Kamehameha IV (1836–1885) | Kamehameha III (1813–1854)
Albert Kamehameha (1858–1862) | Kiwalaʻo (died 1851)

Robert Young | Grace
Davis Family
John Young (1742–1835) | Namokuelua (died 1804)
Robert (1796–1813?) | Haʻale | James Kānehoa (1797–1851) | Sarah Kaniaulono (1797–1867)
Jane Lahilahi | Nuʻuanu
Grace Kamaʻikuʻi (1808–1866) | Governor Cox Keʻeaumoku (1784–1824)
Samuel Nuʻuanu
Jane Lahilahi (1813–1862) | Joshua Kaʻeo (c. 1808–1858) | Keoni Ana (1810–1857) | Julia Alapaʻi (died 1849)
Albert Kūnuiākea (1851–1903) | Mary Lonokahikini (1851–1904) | Peter Kekuaokalani (1836–1880) | Keliʻimaikaʻi "Alebada" (died 1851)

Notes:
- Apple, Russel A. (1978). "Appendix A: Young Family Geneology". Pahukanilua: Homestead of John Young: Kawaihae, Kohala, Island of Hawaiʻi : Historical Data Section of the Historic Structure Report. Honolulu: National Park Office, Hawaii State Office. pp. 39–41. OCLC 4962701.
- "John Young's Family". The Daily Bulletin. Vol. XV, no. 51. Honolulu. March 2, 1891. p. 2.
- Kanahele, George S. (1999). Emma: Hawaii's Remarkable Queen. Honolulu: University of Hawaii Press. p. 5. ISBN 978-0-8248-2240-8. OCLC 40890919.
- McKinzie, Edith Kawelohea (1983). Stagner, Ishmael W. (ed.). Hawaiian Genealogies: Extracted from Hawaiian Language Newspapers. Vol. 1. Honolulu: University of Hawaii Press. pp. 38–39. ISBN 0-939154-28-5. OCLC 12555087.

== Death ==
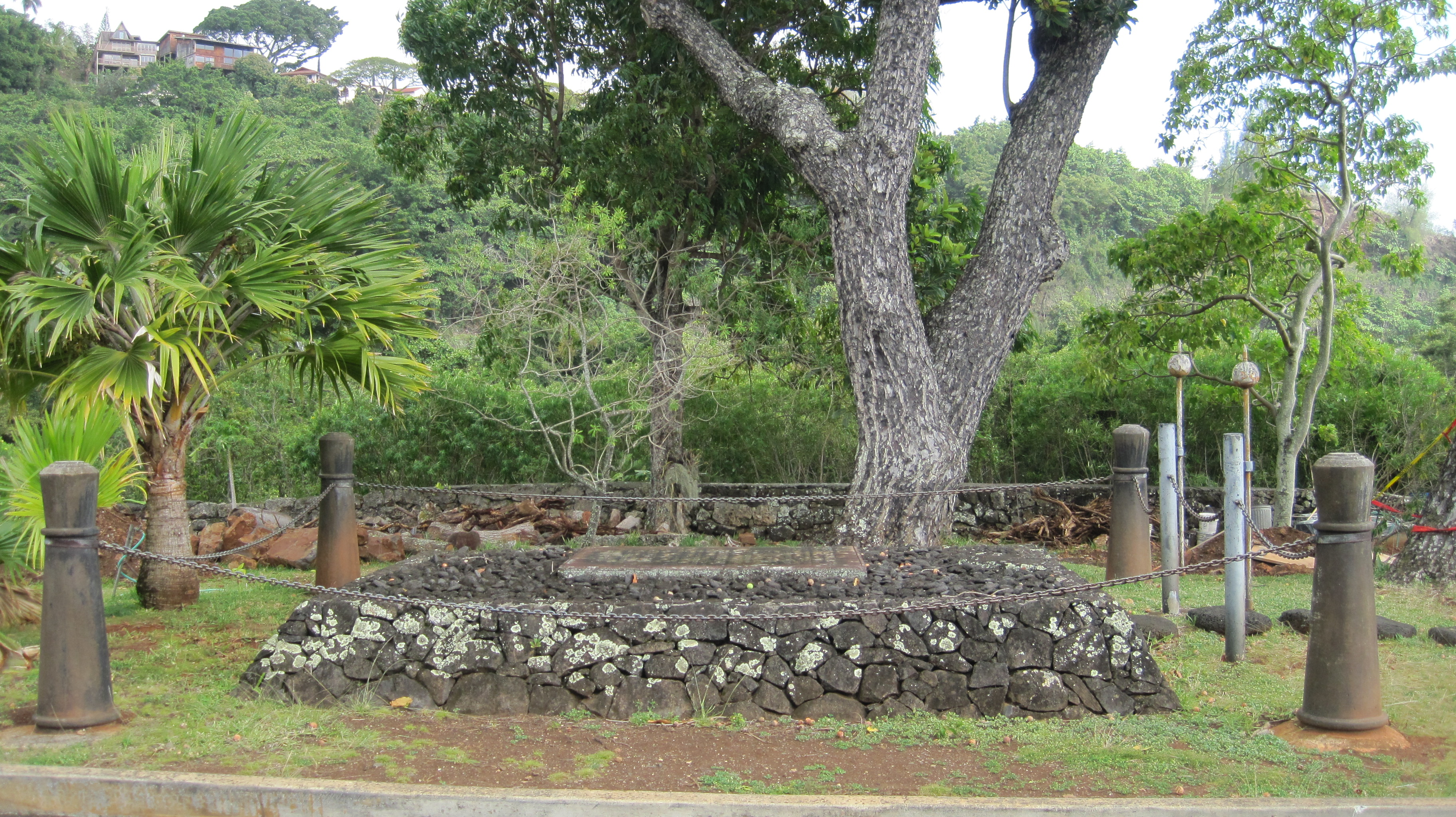
John Young's gravesite at the Royal Mausoleum of Hawaii

During an illness in December 1835, his daughter Grace sent a ship to collect him and his wife Kaʻōanāʻeha. She transported them from Kawaihae on the Big Island to Honolulu, so Rooke could administer a heart medication and keep him under observation. He insisted on bringing his own coffin with him. "When I die, I don't want to leave any question about how I wished my body to be treated," he said. Fear of being murdered and having his body treated for burial in the old traditions, with the chiefs taking his bones to make icons or fishhooks, plagued his painful days and nights. Two weeks after his arrival on Oahu, Young died at Rooke House in Honolulu on 17 December 1835, at the age of 93 after living in Hawaiʻi for 46 years. Grace sent for the family while the Oahu chiefs planned his funeral. His lands were divided among his children and the children of Isaac Davis he had adopted.

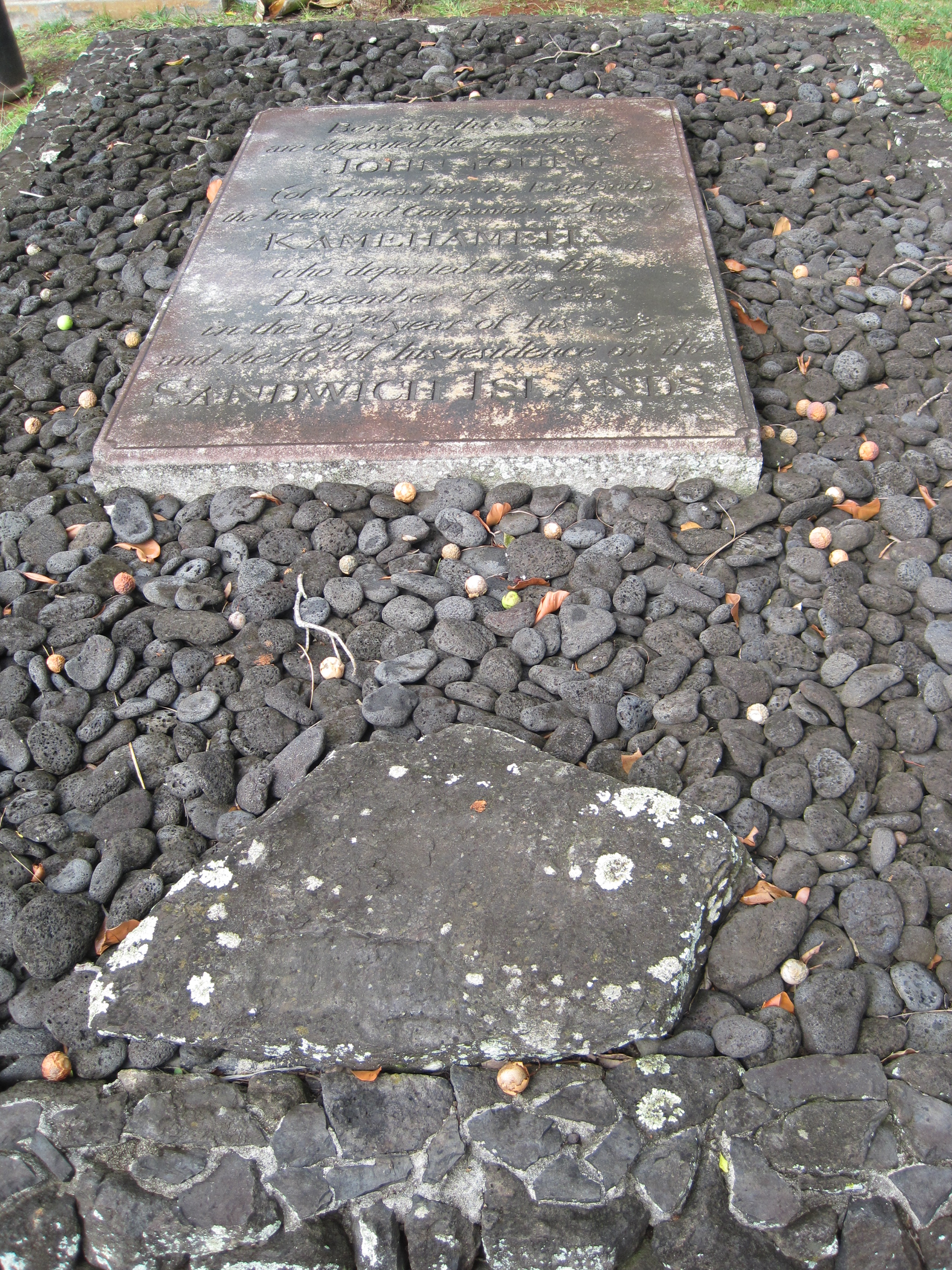
Plaque atop John Young's grave

He was interred in the cemetery adjacent to the little coral mausoleum, called Pohukaina, on the Iolani Palace ground, on 18 December 1835. Later he was removed to the Royal Mausoleum of Hawaii at Mauna 'Ala on 16 May 1866. At the Royal Mausoleum, on a flat, grey stone which covers his grave, is the following inscription:

Beneath this stone are deposited
the remains of John Young
(of Lancashire, England)
The friend and companion-in-war of
Kamehameha.
who departed this life
17 December 1835,
in the 93rd year of his age
and the 46th of his residence
on the Sandwich Islands

== In popular culture ==
Young is played in the 2025 series Chief of War by Dutch actor Benjamin Hoetjes.

Government offices
| Preceded by First | Royal Governor of Hawaii Island; 1802 - 1812? | Succeeded by John Adams Kuakini |
