= Rick San Nicolas =

Rick Makanaaloha Kiaʻimeaokekanaka San Nicolas is a Native Hawaiian and CHamoru master featherwork artist, educator, and cultural practitioner, raised in Hawaiʻi on the island of Oʻahu. In 2014, he was selected as the first artist for the Hawaiʻi Volcanoes National Park's Artist-in-Residence program. He was a cultural adviser for the featherwork in a 2024 local short film “Kūkini.” San Nicolas acted as a featherwork cultural consultant for the Apple TV series Chief of War.
