= Kaʻiana =

- Kamaliʻikane (Prince) of Puna, Kaʻū and the island of Kauaʻi
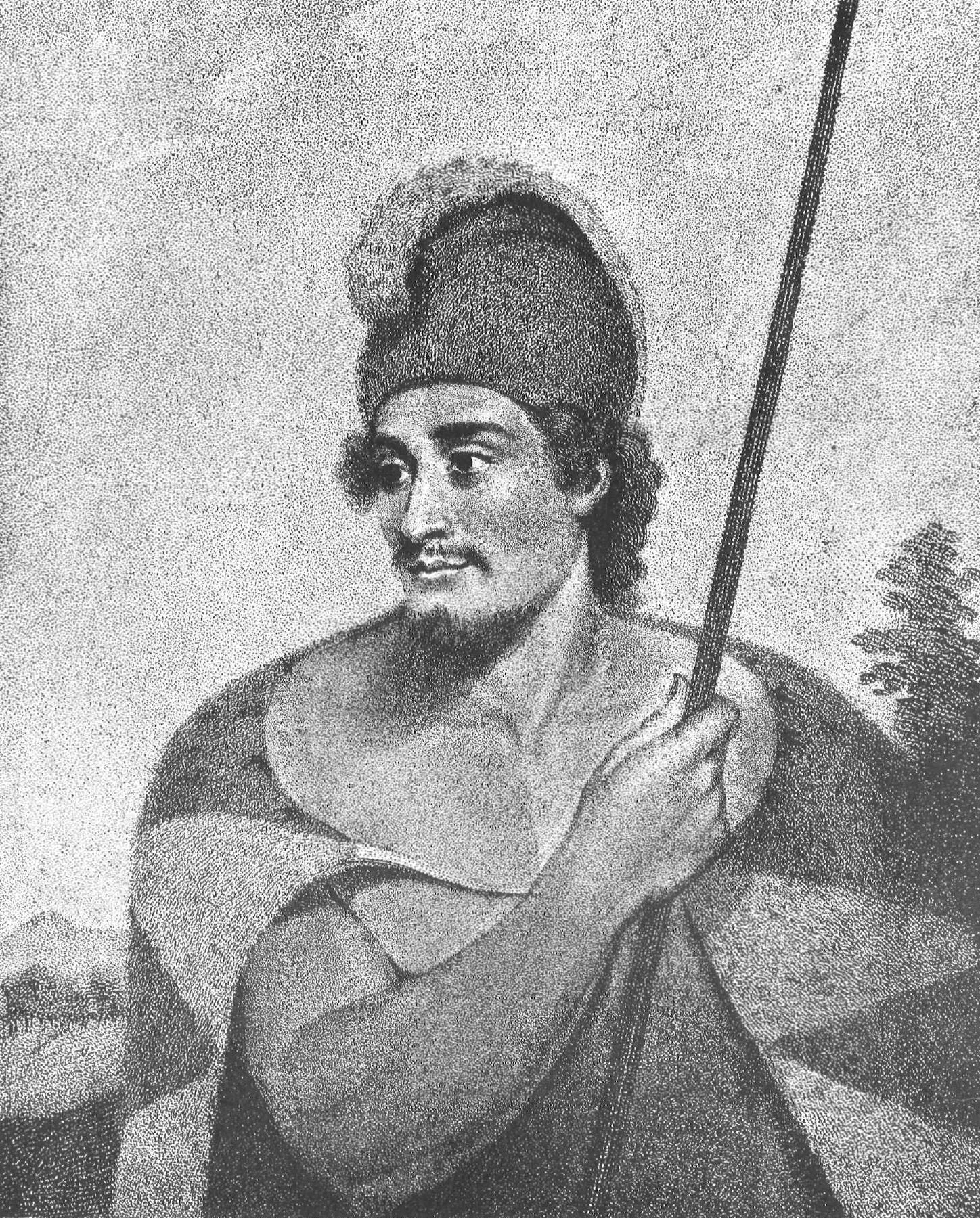
- Tianna, a Prince of Atooi or Kaʻiana, lithograph after painting by Spoilum, 1787. in John Meares. Voyages Made in the Years 1788 and 1789
- Born: Keawe-Kaʻiana-a-ʻAhuʻula; 1755; Place of birth unknown
- Died: May 1795 (aged 39–40); Laʻimi, Nuʻuanu Valley
- Spouses: Kekupuohi (w); Loʻe (w)
- Issue: Kamakahalahalawai (k)
- House: House of Keawe
- Father: ʻAhuʻula-a-Keawe (k)
- Mother: Kaupekamoku (w)
- Religion: Hawaiian religion
- Military career
- Allegiance: Kahekili II, Kamakahelei and Kāʻeokūlani and Kamehameha I
- Conflicts: Kahekili II's conquest of Oʻahu and the Battle of Nuʻuanu

Kaʻiana, also known as Keawe-Kaʻiana-a-ʻAhuʻula, (about 1755 – 1795) was a Native Hawaiian warrior and aliʻi of Puna, Hawai‘i, who turned against Kamehameha I in 1795 during his conquest of Oahu and then sided with the island's ruler, Kalanikupule.

== Birth and family ==
While Kaʻiana's place of birth is unknown, it is likely he was raised in Hilo. His mother was Kaupekamoku (w), the granddaughter of Ahia (wahine/female) from the ʻĪ family of Hilo, Hawaii. His father was ʻAhuʻula-a-Keawe (k), a son of Keaweʻīkekahialiʻiokamoku (kāne/male). His name is sometimes recorded with different variations; Tianna, Tyaana, Ty-e-a-naa, Tianner, and Tayanah. Through his father, he is first cousin to much of the Island of Hawaii's nobility, including Kalaniʻōpuʻu (k), Keōua (k), and Keawemaʻuhili (k). His mother's pedigree included her paternal heritage to Oahu and Hilo, while her maternal line is from the Maui royal family. She was half-sister to Kekaulike (k).

He had two half-brothers from his mother with whom he maintained close relationships until their deaths rebelling against Kamehameha I. Their names were Nāmākēhā (k) and Nāhiʻōleʻa (k). Their fathers were of the Maui royal family. Nāhiʻōleʻa is considered one of the fathers of Kekūanaōʻa along with Kiʻilaweau (k), both husbands of Inaina (w) in a tradition called poʻolua. The three brothers helped conquer Oahu with Kahekili II in the early 1780s but moved to Kauaʻi after becoming dissatisfied and unsuccessfully rebelling against Kahekili.

On March 8, 1779, either Kaʻiana-a-ʻAhuʻula or his cousin Kaʻiana Ukupe is recorded as "Taiana" traveling aboard HMS Resolution from Kauaʻi to Niʻihau on the last leg of Captain James Cook's third and final voyage after the navigators death. The ship's surgeon David Samwell recorded that "Taiana" request to return to England with the ship was refused. His cousin Kaʻiana Ukupe, a son of Kaolohaka (k), was the father of Kaikioʻewa, the first governor of Kauaʻi who joined forces along with others to support Kamehameha I.

Kaʻiana was described by Captain John Meares in 1788: "He was near six feet five inches in stature, and the muscular form of his limbs was of an Herculean appearance". Meares also stated that he carried himself; "replete with dignity, and having lived in the habit of receiving the respect due to superior rank in his own country, he possessed an air of distinction".

== Kahekili II's conquest of Oʻahu ==
Around 1770 Peleioholani (k), the aliʻi nui or mōʻī (supreme ruler) of Oʻahu died and was succeeded by his son Kumahana (k) who was deposed by a meeting of the aliʻi (nobles) in council and replaced by Kahahana. Kumahana took his family to Kauaʻi where they were given refuge in Waimea. Kumahana's only son Kaneoneo married Kamakahelei, a queen regnant of Kauaʻi and died attempting to regain Oʻahu. In 1782 Kaʻopulupulu, the kahuna nui (high priest) of Puʻu o Mahuka Heiau died, removing the last obstacle to invasion for Aliʻi Nui, Kahekili II of Maui. His forces launched from Lahaina, Maui and landed in Waikiki on Oʻahu with warriors that included Kaʻiana, Namakeha, and Nāhiʻōleʻa. After Kahahana's defeat many of the forces remained on Oʻahu including Kaʻiana and his brothers. They lived at Kāneʻohe and Heʻeia on the Windward Coast of the island. After two years, there was resistance to Maui's occupation. The people of Oʻahu gained the support of some of the Maui aliʻi, most notable being Kaʻiana, Namakeha, and Nāhiʻōleʻa. The conspiracy was discovered and while many of the Maui men were killed, Kaʻiana and his brothers escaped to Kauaʻi, which was now ruled by Kamakahelei and her husband Kāʻeokūlani, a son of Kekaulike, making him a half-brother of Kahekili.

== Kauaʻi ==
On Kauaʻi, Kaʻiana and his brothers, as well as their families, were cared for by Kāʻeokūlani. When the first Europeans to return to the islands since the death of Cook arrived, they were greeted by Kāʻeokūlani and Kaʻiana, (Note: James Jackson Jarves calls Kaʻiana a brother of Kāʻeo, but they were cousins through Kukaniauaula (w), a grandmother the two had in common that Fornander believes is the same as Papaikaniau (w).) carrying his young daughter and accompanied by a large group of attendants. HMS King George and HMS Queen Charlotte were captained by Nathaniel Portlock and George Dixon. The ships anchored off Waimea on June 19, 1786. Dixon said that Kaʻiana's daughter was:

"..a fine child about seven years old; ... he treated her with a fondness truly paternal, carrying her for the most part in his arms, and when fatigued, his attendants anxiously strove which should have the honour of bearing little Miss, till the father again reassumed his pretty charge."

— George Dixon, A Voyage Round the World (1789)

Portlock wrote in his journal about the first Christmas on Kauai, December 1786. He had passed out small presents to the women and children and was then surprised by gifts of pigs and fresh vegetables delivered to his ship from Kaʻiana. A few months after Portlock and Dixon had left the island, in the summer of 1787, the Nootka arrived captained by John Meares. The ship stayed only a few months before sailing off with Kaʻiana on board. When Dixon had returned from the Pacific Northwest, he was hoping to re-unite with Portlock and the King George at Kauaʻi in mid-September. He was told by ʻŌpūnui that another ship had arrived and left with Kaʻiana. He described Meares as "ʻeno", Hawaiian for a "wild and suspicious man" who had given no gifts in return for the provisions he was given. After his ship was provisioned Dixon returned gifts to Kāʻeokūlani of a large woollen cloak and an iron adze. Portlock returned on October 3, 1787, but finding Dixon gone, sailed on almost immediately.

== Voyage with Meares ==
On September 2, 1787, Ka'iana departed Hawai'i on John Meares' ship Nootka as Meares' guest. They arrived in Canton (Guangzhou) in October 1787. Ka'iana also visited Macau.

In southern China, Meares picked up three other Hawaiians left there by other Western ships. These three include a stout man and a boy from Maui, who were not specifically named, and a Hawaiian woman in Canton by the name of Wynee, who had been left there by Captain Charles William Barkley, on the British ship Imperial Eagle. Wynee and the unnamed man died of illness on the voyage home while the fate of the young boy was never recorded. Ka'iana, who remained by Wynee's bedside caring for her, contracted a fever as well. He reportedly became seriously distraught upon learning of her death, although he would recover. Wynee bequeathed to Ka'iana some trade articles she had acquired and asked him to deliver her remaining possessions to her father and mother.

After departing from Canton, Meares bought the ship Iphigenia. Meares gave command of the ship to William Douglas and transferred Kaʻiana to it. Kaʻiana and Douglas then sailed to the Philippines and the northwestern coast of North America.

Douglas would name one of the stops off the coast of Alaska as "Tianna's Bay" in honor of the Hawaiian, although today the bay is known as Icy Bay.

== Under service to Kamehameha I ==
The Iphigenia arrived in Maui on December 6 or 7, 1788, where Ka'iana was greeted by his brother-in-law "Harwallenee" [sic]. The ship departed for Hawaiʻi, stopping at Kawaihae, Kailua and finally docking at Kealakekua Bay where they were greeted by Kamehameha I. According to historian Samuel Kamakau, Kamehameha I persuaded Kaʻiana to stay in Hawaiʻi, saying, "Here is land, here are chiefs, here are commoners. Let us live on Hawaii. Do not return to Kauai and Oahu."

The Iphigenia would later sail to Kauai to bring Kaʻiana's relatives, including his wife and son, and his brothers and their relatives to Hawaiʻi. Kaʻiana and his brothers would settle on Hawaiʻi and help Kamehameha I secure a larger arsenal of Western firearms and ammunition from visiting foreign ships to use in his conquest of the Hawaiian Islands. At this time, the island of Hawaiʻi was divided between the Kamehameha I and his cousin Keōua Kūʻahuʻula, whom the brothers would help Kamehameha defeat and kill in 1791.

Kaʻiana was installed as district chief of Puna by Kamehameha I. In January 1793, British explorer George Vancouver visited Hawaiʻi and described how the two brothers were of a "turbulent, treacherous, and ungrateful dispositions." The British explorer wrote, "Nomatahah (Nāmākēhā) and Tamaahmootoo (Kameʻeiamoku) are artful, designing, and restless characters, and have dispositions to act on all occasions of hazard, or unlawful attempt, in conjunction with Tianna (Kaʻiana)." Vancouver also alluded that the two brothers were involved in the capture of the American ship Fair American.

In 1795, Kaʻiana and his brother were ordered by Kamehameha I to join him on his campaign against Kalanikūpule, the aliʻi nui of Maui and Oʻahu and the son and successor of Kahekili II. Kaʻiana and Nāhiʻōleʻa would answer the call, but Nāmākēhā ignored the summons.

On Oʻahu, Kaʻiana and Nāhiʻōleʻa, dissatisfied with being excluded from Kamehameha's war council, defected to Kalanikūpule. Kaʻiana‘s wife Kekupuohi refused to defect against Kamehameha. Kaʻiana and Nāhiʻōleʻa were both killed at the Battle of Nuʻuanu in 1795.

== In popular culture ==
Kaʻiana is the protagonist of the historical drama series Chief of War, where he is portrayed by Jason Momoa.

== Ancestry ==
Kaʻiana family tree

**Key- Subjects with bold titles and blue bold box= Aliʻi line. Bold title and grey bolded box= Lower ranking Aliʻi line. Bold title and un-bolded box= European nobility. Regular name and box= makaʻāinana or untitled foreign subject**.

**Iwikauikaua (k)**	**Keākamāhana (w)**
**Kanaloakapulehu (k)**	**Keākealaniwahine (w)**
**Ka'ulahea (k)**	**Papaikaniau**; **Lonoikaniau**; **Kukaniauaula (w)** (Note: "Papaikaniau, Lonoikaniau or Kukaniauaula" (Note: Stokes, John F.G. (1909). Index to "The Polynesian Race" by Abraham Fornander. Honolulu, Hawaii: Bishop Museum Press. p. 75. ISBN 978-1371858827. OCLC 227259228.))	**Mauna Puoanui (k)**	**Keaweʻīkekahialiʻiokamoku (k)**	Unknown ?
**Kekaulike (k)**	**Kanaluihoae (k) (Note: "Namakeha was son of the above-mentioned Kaupekamoku and Kanaluihoae, a brother or cousin of Kekaulike of Maui." (Note: Fornander, Abraham (1919). Fornander Collection of Hawaiian Antiquities and Folk-Lore. Honolulu, Hawaii: Bishop Museum Press. p. 288. ISBN 9781330368510. OCLC 3354092.))**	**Kuimiheua II (k) (Note: "Nahiolea was another son of the same above-mentioned Kaupekamoku and Kuimiheua II, a cousin of Kekaulike of Maui." (Note: Fornander, Abraham (1919). Fornander Collection of Hawaiian Antiquities and Folk-Lore. Honolulu, Hawaii: Bishop Museum Press. p. 288. ISBN 9781330368510. OCLC 3354092.))**	**Kaupekamoku (w)**	**Ahuula-a-Keawe (k)**	**Kaolohaka-a-Keawe (k)**
**Namakeha (k)**	**Nāhiʻōleʻa (k)**	**Kaʻiana (k)** (Note: "Kaiana's father was Ahaula, who was the son of Keawe, king of Hawaii, by a mother whose name is now unknown. The mother of Kaiana was Kaupekamoku, a granddaughter of Ahia, of the family of Hilo") (1755 - 1796)	**Kaʻiana Ukupe (k)**

Explanatory notes and reference sources
