= John McCluer =

British hydrographer (c. 1759–1795)

- Born: c. 1759
- Died: 1795
- Military career
- Allegiance: Kingdom of Great Britain; East India Company
- Service: Bombay Marine
- Rank: Captain
- Known for: Hydrography

John McCluer (c. 1759 – 1795) was a Scottish hydrographer who rose to the rank of captain in the Bombay Marine. Between 1785 and 1787 he surveyed Muscat and Matruh harbours at the entrance to the Gulf of Oman. In 1787 he was ordered to survey the bank of soundings off Bombay, which he did so thoroughly that his charts remained practically as he left them for nearly seventy years. In 1790 he was appointed to command a small expedition to the Pelew Islands, with the double object of surveying and establishing friendly relations with the natives. He was lost at sea in 1795.

== Career ==
=== Persian Gulf ===
John McCluer, born about 1759, joined the Bombay Marine as a volunteer about 1777. He was promoted second lieutenant on 18 February 1780 and first lieutenant on 8 January 1784. He obtained a high reputation as a surveyor while still a lieutenant. In 1785, in the Scorpion, he made a new plan of the cove of Muscat, whence considerable trade was then carried on to China and India, as well as to Bussorah and the various ports in the Gulf of Oman. In 1786–1787, in the intervals of his regular duty, he completed a survey of the Persian Gulf. It was rough work, but by far the best then existing, and enabled Alexander Dalrymple to publish from the surveys a chart extending from the entrance to the Persian Gulf to Bussorah.

The original survey of the Persian coast is contained in two sheets, that including the south-eastern part of the coast, from the entrance of the Gulf, for a distance of 300 miles (483 km), being on a smaller scale than the other. The other sheet contains the rest of the coast, with the principal channel of the Shatt-ul-Arab as far up as Bussorah, distant about 30 leagues (145 km) from the sea; this place, being at that time the chief seat of commerce and communication between India and the Turkish dominions, besides possessing an establishment of the East India Company, was much frequented by their ships.

=== Malabar Coast ===
Plan of Diu Island, 1788

From 1787 to 1790, McCluer was engaged in the East Indies, on a survey of the western coast of India, under the orders of the East India Company: at first in the Experiment, and afterwards in the Hawk and Experiment, neither of which were of more than 50 tons burden. He had as his assistant a certain John Procter in a pattamar, of whose ability he speaks in the highest terms. Having completed the coast between Bombay and Surat, he sounded over the space between the coast of Guzarat and India, made surveys of other parts of the Indian coast, and then proceeded to the Maldivh Islands and Diego-Garcia. A box and two pocket (Arnold) chronometers were used, but these proving irregular in their rates, he returned them. The bearings and altitudes of the land were taken by means of a Hadley sextant. Some of the results were incorporated by James Horsburgh in his East India Directory.

=== Pacific Islands ===
Discoveries of the Panther and Endeavour, 1790, 1791 and 1792

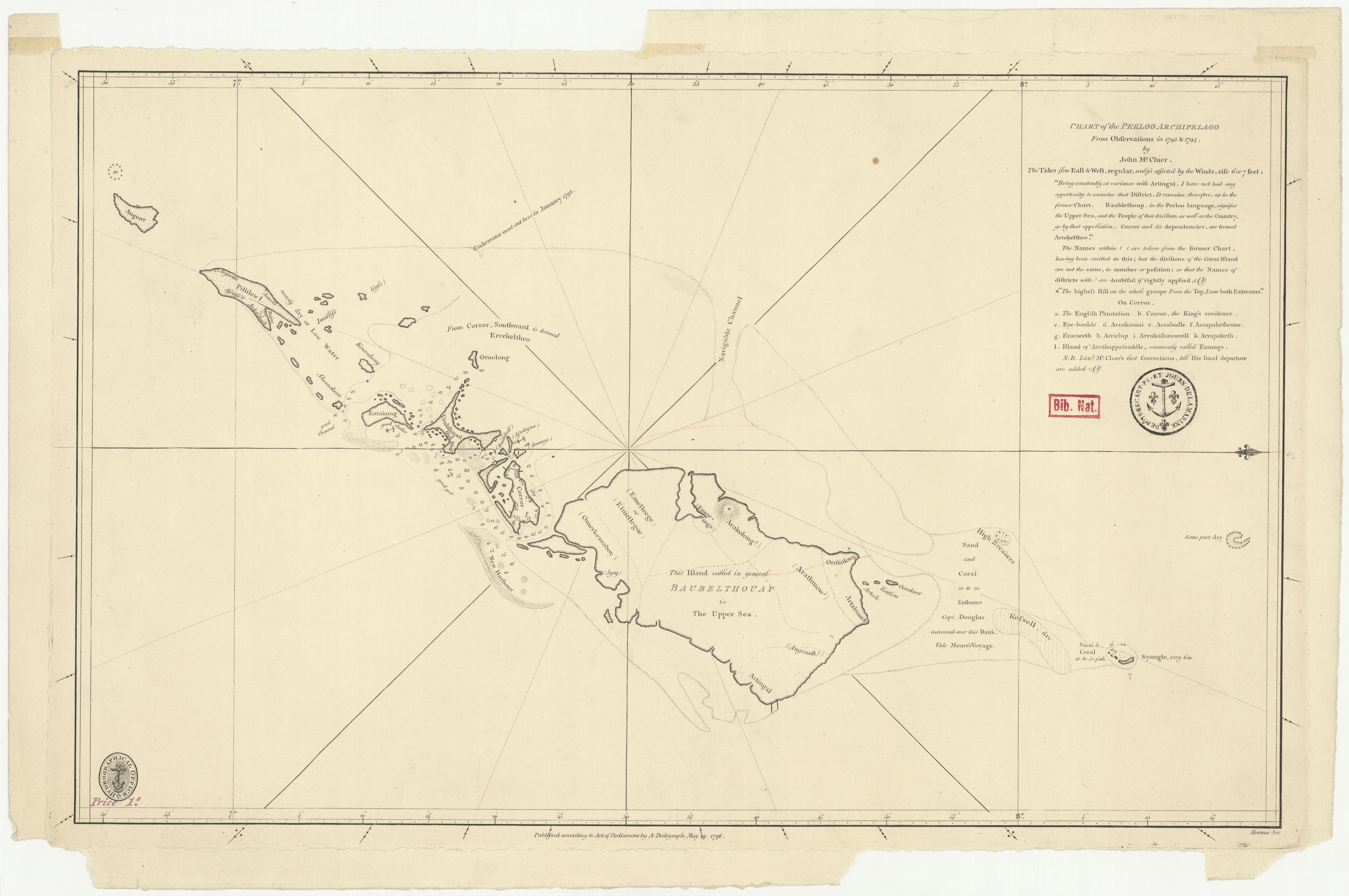
Chart of the Peeloo Archipelago from observations in 1793 & 1794

In 1790 McCluer was appointed to command a small expedition to proceed to the Pelew Islands (now Palau) for the purpose of carrying presents to their king (ibedul), Abba Thulle, and to inform him of the death of his son, Prince Lee Boo, who had come to England with Captain Wilson's expedition in 1783. The Panther and Endeavour, vessels belonging to the East India Company's marine establishment at Bombay, were fitted for this service, under the command of Captain McClure. Wedgeborough and White, two officers of the Bombay Marine who had been shipwrecked with Wilson in the Antelope on those islands, were appointed lieutenants. On 23 August, McCluer set out in the Panther, with the Endeavour, under Lieutenant William Drummond, as companion ship, reaching the Pelew Islands on 21 January 1791, where they were welcomed with feasting, singing, and dancing: for they brought with them livestock, guns, and other presents.

On 12 February, McCluer embarked, in the Panther, on a supply trip to China, and was accompanied by three significant islander youths: the adopted son, Kokiuaki, and daughter of Abba Thulle, and another young girl. He describes "[t]he King ordering his own brother Arrakoker with his State canoe to go and fetch them on board".

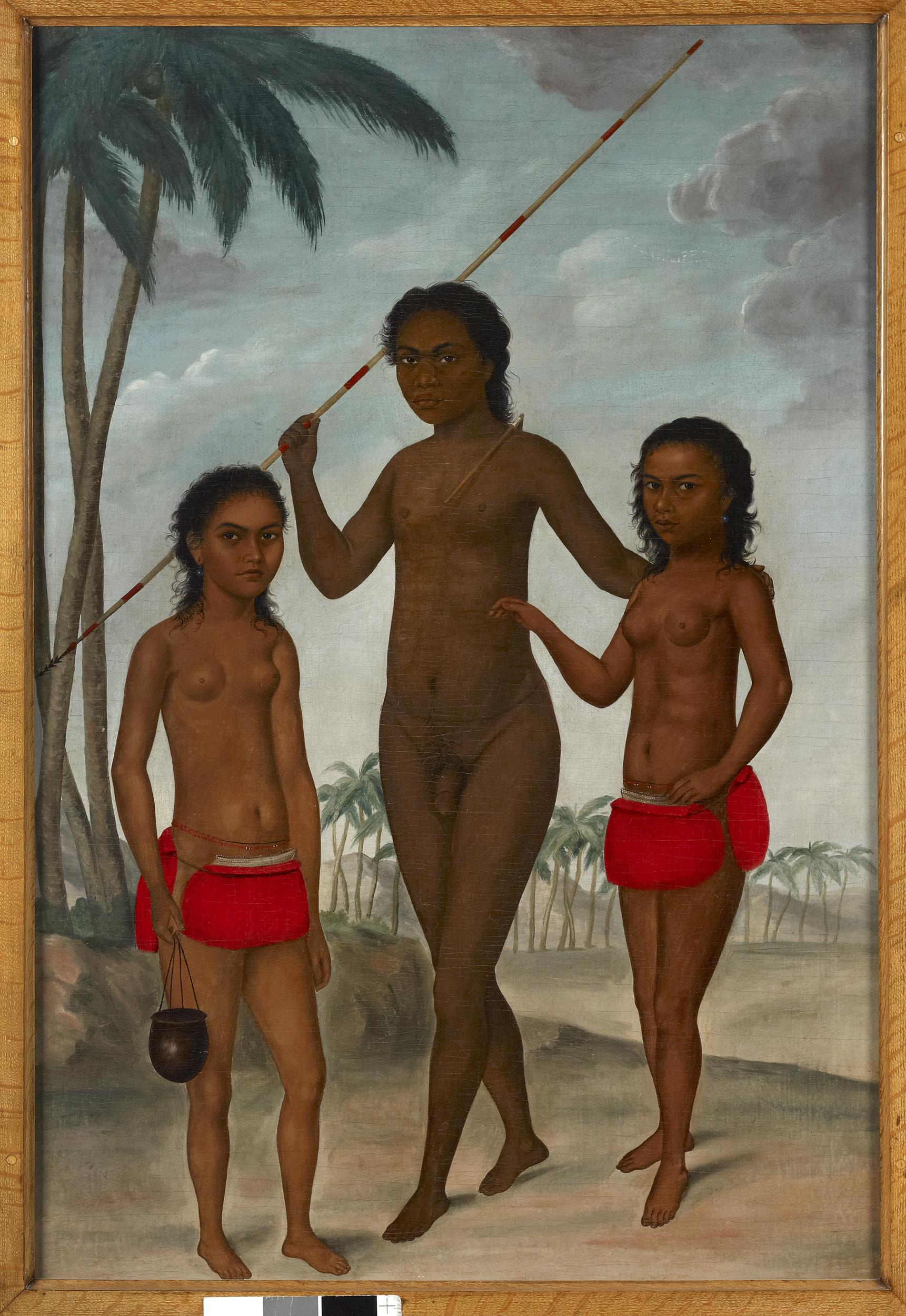
Portrait of Kokiuaki and his sisters by Spoilum, 1791

During their stay at Macao, the natives were inoculated with the small-pox. McClure had portraits in oils made of them by Spoilum, on which he writes:

The famous painter Spoilem came down to Macao at my request, his terms were to be ensured 50 Dollars for his trip, this sum I gave him for a picture of myself and the three Pelew people in a groupe, this piece I hope is already in your possession, which I left with Mr. Freeman [at Macao] to be sent home by the ships next season. This piece was judged to be a striking likeness of everyone in the groupe, and the Palau people were much pleased with their own resemblance. Dr. Harrison and several of the Gentlemen had a copy of the three people.

On 21 March the China fleet sailed for England, escorted by the Leopard and Thames as far as Java Head; and thus the Panther's journals were transmitted home.

Another object of the mission was to make a survey of the Pelew group, with the view of ascertaining whether there was a harbour capable of affording safety and provision to any of the company's ships which might be disabled through stress of weather in their voyages to or from China. According to Laughton, "McCluer carried out the survey with his accustomed ability". Between January 1791 and January 1793 he examined the Pelew Islands, the Sulu Archipelago, and a great part of the coast of New Guinea. He also discovered a deep inlet on the western end of New Guinea which was afterwards named McCluer Gulf in his honour.

== Madness ==
On returning to the Pelew Islands from New Guinea in January 1793, McCluer suddenly announced to Wedgeborough, his first lieutenant, his intention of resigning the command and settling there with the intention of founding an English settlement. On 2 February he formally wrote, desiring Wedgeborough take the command. "I will write", he said, "to the Bombay Presidency the cause I have for remaining at this place. It will be sufficient vindication for you and the rest of the gentlemen belonging to the vessel for me here to acknowledge that you have used every argument in your power to persuade me from this uncommon and unprecedented step. … It is nothing but my zeal for my country that prompts me." Wedgeborough finally supplied him with arms and other necessaries from the ship's stores, and left him.

"It would seem that the long and arduous work in New Guinea had weakened his mind", notes Laughton, "and that he was unable to resist the fascinations of the dusky beauties of the islands. It is only by a species of insanity that his extraordinary conduct and breach of all rules of naval discipline can be explained."

After fifteen months' residence on the island McCluer tired of his solitude. Having been promoted to be captain in the Bombay Marine on 27 June 1793, he resolved to return to the service of the East India Company and go to Ternate "to hear the news". As bad weather came on he changed his mind and steered for China, reaching Macao after a perilous navigation in a native boat, without compass or other instruments, and with no provisions except cocoa-nuts and water. He had five men in the boat with him, who seem to have all arrived safe, though McCluer himself was afterwards laid up with a severe attack of fever and ague.

On recovering he purchased a vessel, by means of a bill drawn on Bombay, and returned to the Pelew Islands, where he embarked his native family and property, with men servants and women servants: "after the manner of the patriarchs of old" (in Laughton's phrase). He then sailed for Calcutta, and meeting on the way the Bombay frigate, bound to Bombay, he sent some of his family on by her. He himself, with the rest, went on to Calcutta, and sailing thence was never heard of again.

== Charts ==
A few of the charts resulting from McCluer's labours were:

- The coast of Malabar, Coromandel and Ceylon;
- The Senhate Islands and reef (Laccadivhs);
- Tracks of HMS Endeavour and Panther, from the east-end of Java to New Guinea;
- Pellew Islands;
- Sulu Archipelago;
- Coast of Arabia from the Curia Muria Islands;
- Port of San Pio Quinto (Philippines).

== Gallery ==
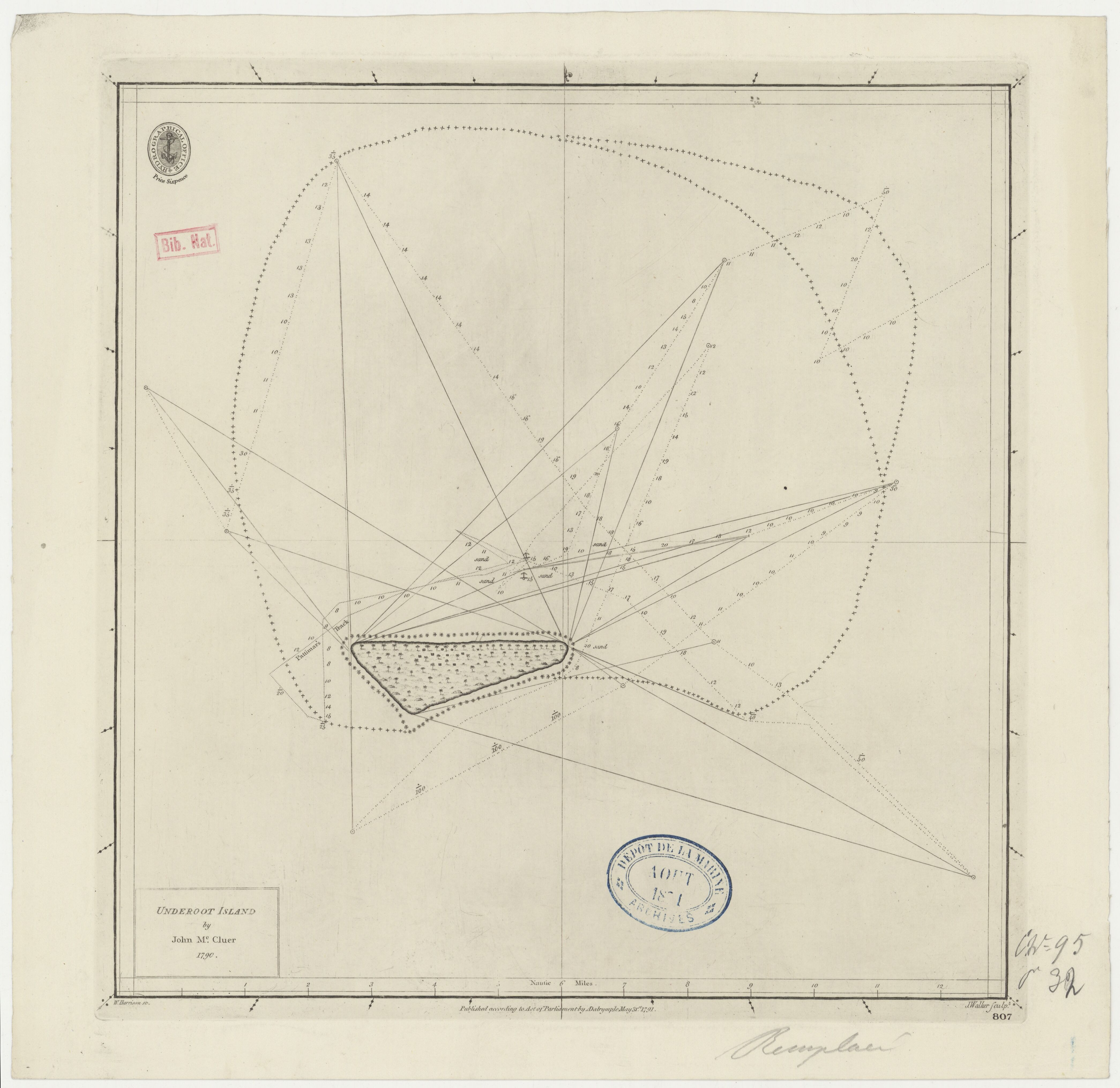
Underoot Island, 1790

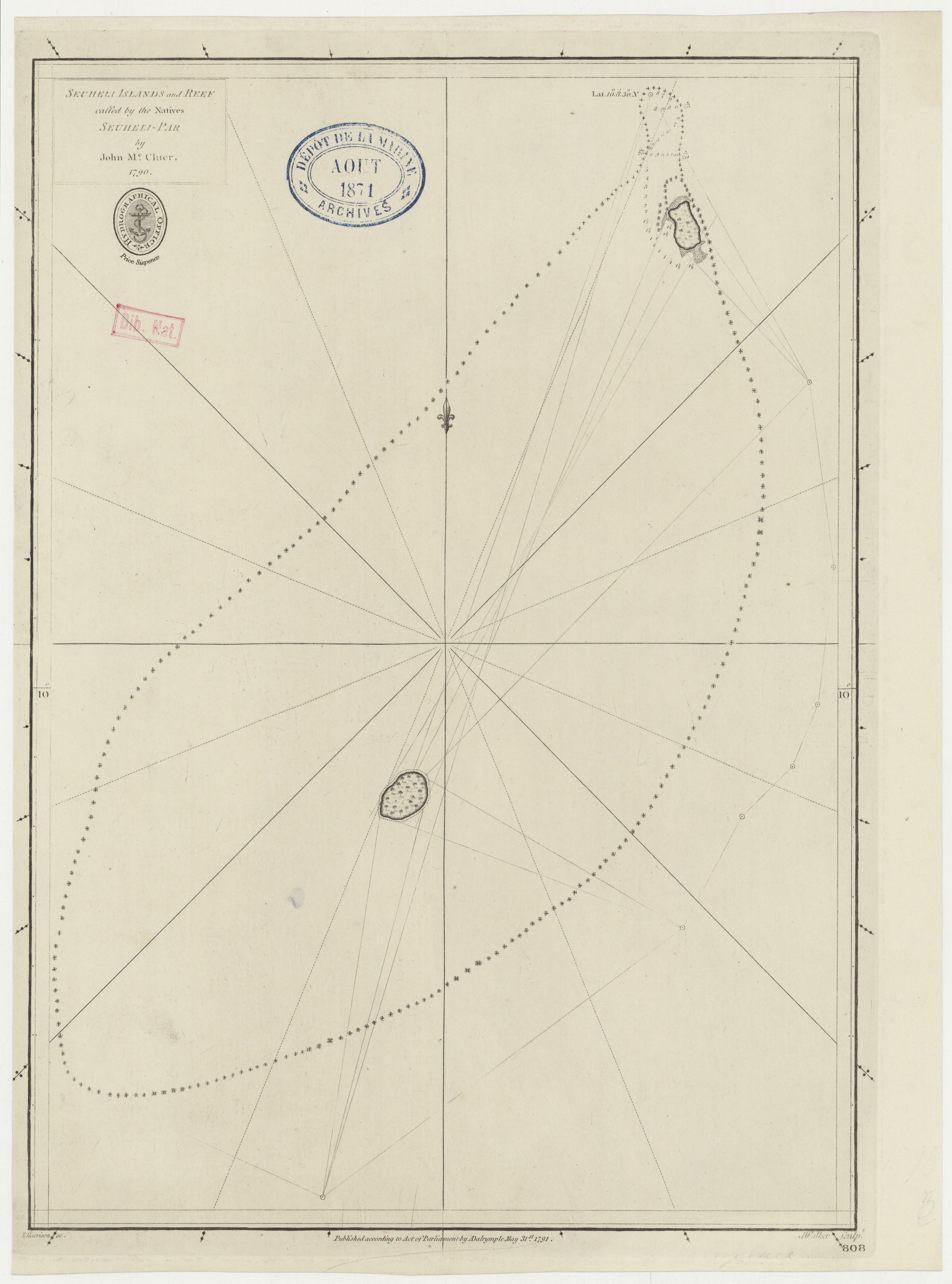
Seuheli Islands and Reef called by the Natives Seuheli-Par, 1790

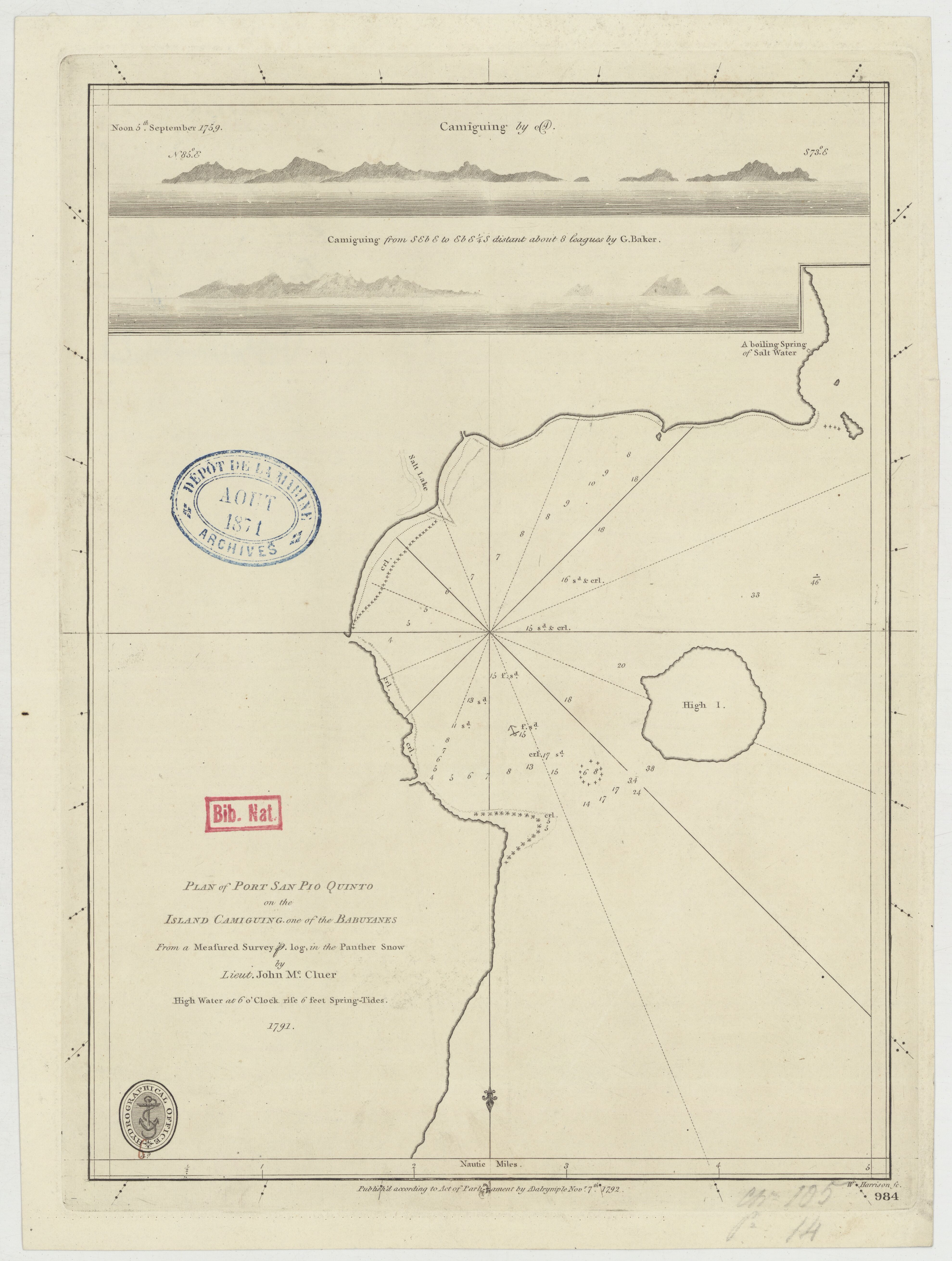
Plan of port San Pio Quinto on the island Camiguing, one of the Babuyanes, 1791

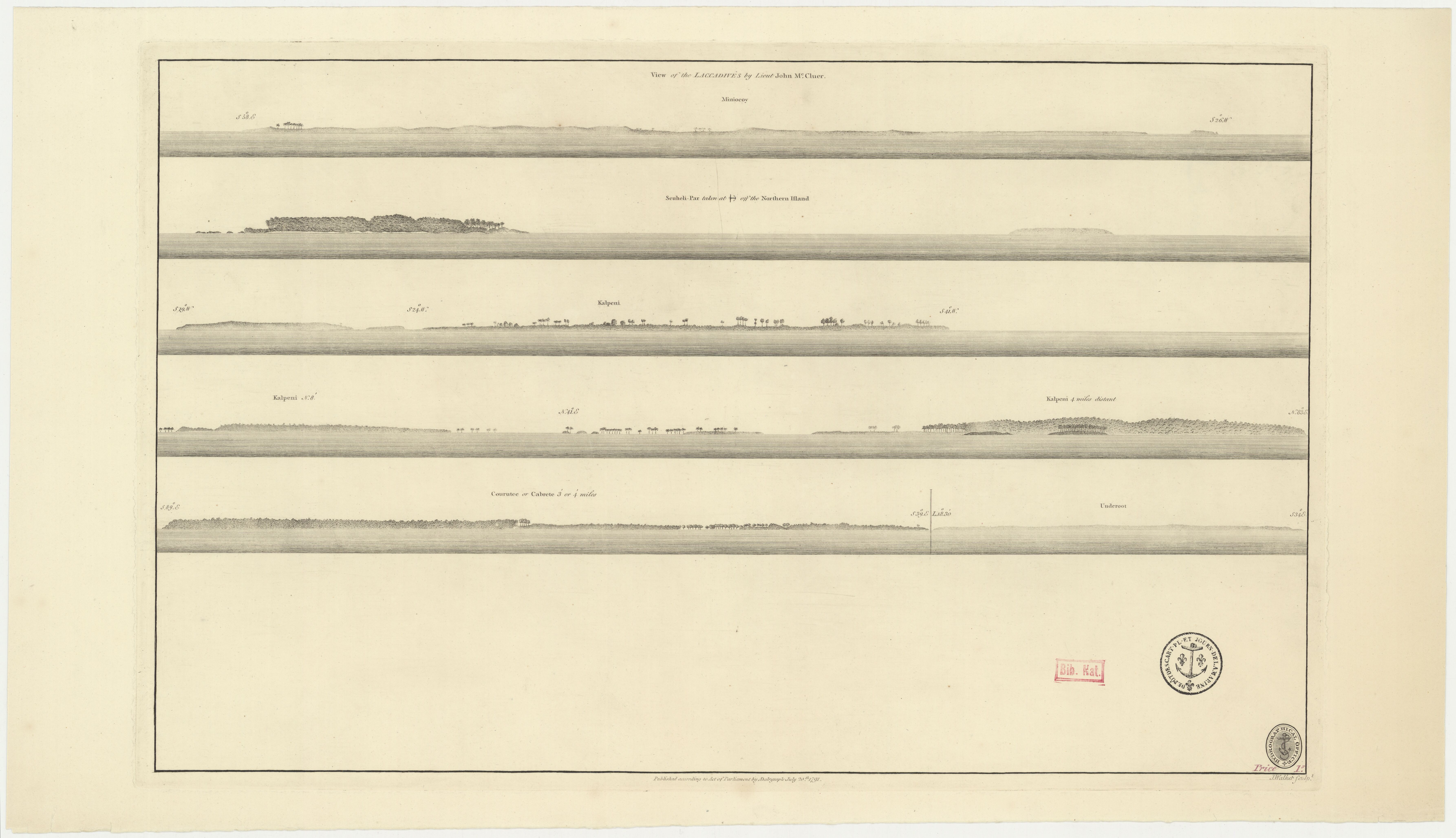
View of the Laccadives, 1791

Views on the coast of Guzarat, 1794

== Sources ==
- David, Andrew C. F. (2007). "McCluer, John (1759?–1795), hydrographer". Oxford Dictionary of National Biography (online ed.). Oxford University Press. doi:10.1093/ref:odnb/17389. (Subscription, Wikipedia Library access or UK public library membership required.)
- Dawson, L. S. (1883). Memoirs of Hydrography. Part I. Eastbourne: Henry W. Keay. p. 15.
- Hockin, J. P. (1803). "Supplement to the Account of the Pelew Islands". Keate, George. An Account of the Pelew Islands. London: Printed for Captain Henry Wilson by W. Bulmer and Co.
- Low, Charles Rathbone (1877). History of the Indian Navy. Vol. 1. London: Richard Bentley and Son. pp. 187–191.
- Nero, Karen L. (2011). "A Tale of Three Time Travelers: Maintaining Relationships, Exploring Visual Technologies". Hermann, Elfriede (ed.). Changing Contexts, Shifting Meanings: Transformations of Cultural Traditions in Oceania. Honolulu: University of Hawai‘i Press. pp. 296, 298–299, 302–304, 308.
- "Capt John McCluer". The British Museum. Retrieved 19 November 2022.
- Lloyd's List. No. 2326. London, 19 August 1791.

Attribution:

- This article incorporates text from a publication now in the public domain: Laughton, John Knox (1893). "McCluer, John". In Lee, Sidney (ed.). Dictionary of National Biography. Vol. 35. London: Smith, Elder & Co. pp. 3–4.
