= Chief of War =

2025 American historical drama series

- Promotional poster
- Genre: Historical drama
- Created by: Thomas Paʻa Sibbett; Jason Momoa
- Starring: Jason Momoa; Luciane Buchanan; Te Ao o Hinepehinga; Te Kohe Tuhaka; Brandon Finn; Siua Ikaleʻo; Mainei Kinimaka; Roimata Fox; Keala Kahuanui-Paleka; Moses Goods; James Udom; Benjamin Hoetjes; Kaina Makua
- Composers: Hans Zimmer; James Everingham
- Country of origin: United States
- Original languages: Hawaiian; English
- No. of episodes: 9

Production
- Executive producers: Jason Momoa; Thomas Paʻa Sibbett; Francis Lawrence; Peter Chernin; Jenno Topping; Erik Holmberg; Doug Jung; Tracey Cook; Brian Andrew Mendoza; Anders Engström; Jim Rowe; Molly Allen; Tim Van Patten
- Running time: 40–59 minutes
- Production companies: On the Roam; Hard J Productions; about:blank; Fifth Season; Chernin Entertainment

Original release
- Network: Apple TV+
- Release: August 1 – September 19, 2025

Chief of War is an American historical drama series created by Thomas Paʻa Sibbett and Jason Momoa for Apple TV+. Momoa also stars in and executive produces the series, which premiered on August 1, 2025.

== Premise ==
Based on true events, the story begins at the end of the 18th century when the four major kingdoms of the Hawaiian Islands (Hawaiʻi, Maui, Oʻahu, and Kauaʻi) are in a state of war. The series follows Kaʻiana, a warrior chief (Hawaiian: aliʻi) of Maui who travels outside the islands, returns home, and joins a bloody campaign to unite the kingdoms under the prophesied rule of Kamehameha I.

== Cast and characters ==
=== Main ===
- Jason Momoa as Kaʻiana
- Luciane Buchanan as Kaʻahumanu
- Te Ao o Hinepehinga as Kupuohi
- Te Kohe Tuhaka as Namake
- Brandon Finn as Prince Kūpule
- Siua Ikaleʻo as Nāhi
- Mainei Kinimaka as Heke
- Roimata Fox as Taula
- Keala Kahuanui-Paleka as ʻŌpūnui
- Moses Goods as Moku
- James Udom as Tony
- Benjamin Hoetjes as John Young
- Kaina Makua as Kamehameha I

=== Supporting ===
- Temuera Morrison as King Kahekili
- Charlie Brumbly as Marley
- Erroll Shand as Captain John Meares
- Sisa Grey as Vai (Note: Partially based on the historical figure of Wynee.)
- Cliff Curtis as Keōua (Note: A composite character merging the historical figures of Keōua Kūʻahuʻula and his brother Kīwalaʻō. This Keōua is also not to be confused with another historical figure of the same name, the father of Kamehameha I, who died c. the 1750s–1760s, two to three decades prior to when this series is set.)
- Ioane Goodhue as Lima
- Branscombe Richmond as King Kalaniʻōpuʻu
- Jason Hood as Captain Simon Metcalfe
- Kekuhi Keali‘ikanaka‘oleohaililani as Keōua's mother

Additionally, several former New Zealand All Blacks players including Piri Weepu, Frank Bunce, Kees Meeuws, Troy Flavell, Liam Messam, and Ofa Tuʻungafasi cameo as Maui Kingdom warriors in the first episode.

== Production ==
According to Thomas Paʻa Sibbett, he and Jason Momoa came up with the idea for Chief of War in 2015; it was initially conceived as a feature film focusing on Kamehameha before switching to the point of view of Kaʻiana instead. It was announced in April 2022 that Apple TV+ had ordered an eight-episode miniseries, with Momoa set to star in and executive produce. Justin Chon was set to direct two episodes of the series that same month. Momoa and Sibbett co-wrote all episodes, with assistance on Hawaiian language dialogue provided by staff of Awaiaulu, an archiving and translation company based in Honolulu. Cultural advisors were appointed in every production department to achieve as high a degree of authenticity as possible, even as far as building war vessels (waʻa) from scratch using real local materials and historical techniques.

Hans Zimmer and James Everingham collaborated with musician Kaumakaiwa Kanakaʻole for the soundtrack that incorporated traditional instruments.

Casting announcements in October and November revealed that Temuera Morrison, Luciane Buchanan, Te Ao o Hinepehinga, Kaina Makua, Moses Goods, Siua Ikaleʻo, Brandon Finn, James Udom, Mainei Kinimaka, and Te Kohe Tuhaka had joined the cast. Cliff Curtis would join in a recurring role in February 2023. Buchanan had auditioned prior through a long-distance Zoom table reading from Los Angeles with Momoa. Kaina Makua had no prior acting experience and was a taro farmer and canoe racing coach before being recommended by both Momoa and later a cultural advisor to Sibbett.

Filming for the series began by October 2022 in New Zealand, with Bay of Islands being used to stand in for 18th century Hawaiʻi. Major battle scenes were filmed from middle November to December in the lava fields of Kalapana; filming still continued when Mauna Loa erupted for the first time in more than three decades during this period.

== Episodes ==
No.	Title	Directed by	Written by	Original release date
1	"The Chief of War"	Justin Chon	Thomas Paʻa Sibbett & Jason Momoa	August 1, 2025
Kaʻiana, a war chief of Maui exiled to Kauaʻi, is summoned by the King of Maui, Kahekili, who wants Kaʻiana and his brothers, Namake and Nāhi, to help him conquer Oʻahu as part of a prophecy predicting the unification of Hawaii. While Kaʻiana is reluctant, Kahekili convinces Kaʻiana by giving him his father’s bones, claiming they were desecrated by Oʻahu warriors trying to steal the bones’ mana to attack Maui. Kaʻiana invades Oʻahu with a war fleet, but is horrified when he realizes that Kahekili had lied and Oʻahu was not planning to attack Maui. Kahekili executes the young king of Oʻahu and has the island’s malae burned. An outraged Kaʻiana plans with his brothers to betray Kahekili.
2	"Changing Tides"	Justin Chon	Thomas Paʻa Sibbett & Jason Momoa and Doug Jung	August 1, 2025
Kahekili realizes that Kaʻiana has betrayed him and correctly surmises that they have returned to Maui to collect Heke, the sister to Kaʻiana’s wife Kupuohi. He sends a war party led by his son, Prince Kūpule, to hunt down Kaʻiana and his brothers. After Kaʻiana and his brothers land at Maui, they are separated as they fight off the warriors of Maui. Kaʻiana encounters the noble princess Kaʻahumanu, who is preparing to leave for the island of Hawaiʻi with her father, chief Moku, to escape Kahekili’s rule and cement her betrothal to the chief of Kohala, Kamehameha. Kaʻiana helps Kaʻahumanu dodge Maui patrols and convinces her to allow his family to accompany her to Hawaiʻi. Meanwhile, a shore party from a British ship captained by John Meares is surprised by Maui warriors and in their haste leave behind a sailor named John Young. Kaʻahumanu and Kaʻiana’s family escape to Hawaiʻi along with John Young, while Kaʻiana falls off a cliff while fighting off Kūpule’s warriors and is presumed dead, only to be picked up by Meares, who is heading to Alaska to hunt for furs.
3	"City of Flowers"	Anders Engström & Brian Andrew Mendoza	Thomas Paʻa Sibbett & Jason Momoa and Doug Jung	August 8, 2025
A year has passed since Kaʻahumanu and Kaʻiana’s family escaped to Hawaiʻi. On Oʻahu, Kahekili resorts to increasingly brutal methods to suppress holdout chiefs, executing entire families who he deems “impure”. On Hawaiʻi, the dying King Kalaniʻōpuʻu gathers his chiefs at Kaʻū, including his nephew Kamehameha and his son Keōua to discuss the rising threat of Kahekili. Moku arranges for Kaʻahumanu and Kamehameha to be wed and confides to Kaʻahumanu that he believes Kamehameha to be the prophesied king to unite the kingdoms. Meanwhile, Kaʻiana, who has accompanied Meares to Alaska, learns of the power of firearms and becomes friends with Tony, a Black crewmate. Meares docks at Zamboanga in the Spanish East Indies and Kaʻiana tries to buy firearms to help fight Kahekili. He is aided by Vai, a native Hawaiian trader who recognized his distinctive feather cloak. Kaʻiana and Vai pitch a deal to Meares to supply them with firearms in exchange for sandalwood. A treacherous member of Meares’ crew, Marley, sells the location of the Hawaiian islands to American captain Simon Metcalfe and kidnaps Tony into slavery.
4	"City of Flowers, Part II"	Anders Engström & Brian Andrew Mendoza	Thomas Paʻa Sibbett & Jason Momoa and Doug Jung	August 15, 2025
On Hawaiʻi, King Kalaniʻōpuʻu dies and his son Keōua becomes king, but the late king bestows Kamehameha with the feathered idol of the war god Kū and the power to wage war. Keōua is outraged but Kamehameha refuses to relinquish the idol or the power. Kamehameha, unsure of his next steps, consults Kaʻahumanu, who urges him to trust his own judgement. John Young teaches Kaʻahumanu and others in Kohala to speak English, and also about the Western world. Meanwhile, believing Kaʻiana to be dead, Kaʻiana’s wife Kupuohi and brother Namake grow close in their shared grief and initiate a romantic relationship, to Nāhi and Heke’s chagrin. In Zamboanga, Kaʻiana discovers that Tony has been kidnapped into slavery. He raids the slave market, rescuing Tony, and barely catches Meares leaving port with Vai.
5	"The Race of the Gods"	Brian Andrew Mendoza	Thomas Paʻa Sibbett & Jason Momoa and Doug Jung	August 22, 2025
On Hawaiʻi, Kamehameha decides to be cautious; against the advice of Moku and his advisors, he does not preemptively attack King Keōua, who continues to resent Kamehameha. Meares’s ship returns to Hawaiʻi, reuniting Kaʻiana with his family, Vai with her son, and John Young with the crew. Kaʻiana rekindles his relationship with Kupuohi, unaware of her romance with Namake. Kaʻiana offers to join Kamehameha’s council of chiefs and provide firearms against Kahekili, but Moku and Kamehameha are unconvinced and suspicious. Kamehameha decides to host a lava sledding race between him, Kaʻiana, and his brothers to decide whether the gods wish for him to heed Kaʻiana’s counsel. Kaʻiana wins, and Kamehameha accepts Kaʻiana’s offer of an alliance. Meanwhile, Keōua leads a raid on Kamehameha’s storehouses in Kohala, initiating hostilities.
6	"The Splintered Paddle"	Brian Andrew Mendoza	Thomas Paʻa Sibbett & Jason Momoa and Doug Jung	August 29, 2025
In the aftermath of the raid, Kamehameha orders Kaʻiana and Kupuohi to Kaʻū to negotiate with Keōua. Kaʻiana and Kupuohi urge Keōua to ally against Kahekili, but he demands the idol of Kū and rebuffs them. Kamehameha promulgates the Law of the Splintered Paddle, where he guarantees the safety of civilians in wartime. Meares supplies Kaʻiana with guns, resupplies, and departs on friendly terms. Tony and John Young decide to stay in Hawaiʻi and teach Kamehameha’s men how to fire muskets. Meanwhile, On Oʻahu, Kahekili tortures several chiefs he suspects of disloyalty. Prince Kūpule grows uneasy with his father Kahekili’s increasingly erratic and bloodthirsty behavior. His friend and lover Lima urges him to take the throne to preserve Maui. Keōua arrives unannounced and proposes an alliance with Kahekili, as long as Hawaiʻi is to remain unconquered. Kahekili accepts and orders his lieutenant ʻŌpūnui to send a battalion to assist Keōua, while secretly planning to backstab him later.
7	"Day of Spilled Brains"	Anders Engström	Thomas Paʻa Sibbett & Jason Momoa and Doug Jung	September 5, 2025
American captain Simon Metcalfe and the crew of the Eleanora land on Hawaiʻi and begin harvesting sandalwood. They are discovered and brought to Kamehameha, professing friendship. Kaʻiana, wary of the men, especially Marley who tried to sell Tony into slavery in Zamboanga, counsels Kamehameha to kill them, but he refuses. Kaʻiana and Tony decide to try to kill Marley themselves on Metcalfe’s ship but are stopped by Kamehameha, who orders Metcalfe to leave in peace. Kaʻiana and his family quarrel over Kamehameha’s decision. Metcalfe, angry at being denied the sandalwood, opens fire on a village, killing and maiming hundreds of Hawaiians, and throws Marley overboard.
8	"The Sacred Niu Grove"	Brian Andrew Mendoza	Thomas Paʻa Sibbett & Jason Momoa and Doug Jung	September 12, 2025
Kaʻiana berates Kamehameha for not killing Metcalfe and his men, and decides to return to his exile in Kauaʻi. Before Kaʻiana leaves for Kauaʻi, Nāhi and Heke, who are now in a relationship, visit a sacred niu grove and find King Keōua and Maui warriors under ʻŌpūnui ravaging it. Keōua kills Nāhi, forcing Heke to watch. ʻŌpūnui rapes Heke before sending her back with Keōua’s message. Kaʻiana tearfully buries his brother’s bones as Keōua throws the overseer of the niu grove into a volcano as a sacrifice to the gods. Kupuohi convinces Kamehameha to accept Kaʻiana’s guns, calling them the "Voice of Kū." Kamehameha and Kaʻahumanu convince Kaʻiana to stay, as Kamehameha accepts the inevitability of bloodshed with Keōua and Kahekili. On Oʻahu, Kahekili, while under the intoxicating influence of ʻawa, accidentally stabs Kūpule in an argument.
9	"The Black Desert"	Jason Momoa	Thomas Paʻa Sibbett & Jason Momoa	September 19, 2025
Anticipating battle, both Kamehameha and Keōua train their troops, with Kamehameha’s troops training with Kaʻiana’s firearms. Meanwhile, Namake confesses to Kaʻiana his relationship with Kupuohi before Kaʻiana’s return, with Kaʻiana forgiving Namake. Before the battle, Kamehameha prays to the idol of Kū, proclaims Kaʻiana a chief of Hawaiʻi, and elevates Queen Kaʻahumanu to be one of his formal advisors. At a lava plain near a volcano, Kamehameha’s army meets Keōua’s army combined with ʻŌpūnui’s detachment of Maui warriors in a pitched battle. During the ritualized taunting before the battle, Kaʻiana goads ʻŌpūnui into ordering an attack, which is cut down by musket fire. A fierce melee ensues as the volcano erupts, wiping out a large portion of Keōua’s army. ʻŌpūnui is killed by Heke in revenge for Nāhi’s death and her own rape, and Keōua is killed by a blast from the erupting volcano. A triumphant Kaʻiana leads the army in hailing Kamehameha, now King of Hawaiʻi. On Oʻahu, Lima informs Kahekili of Keōua’s defeat. Kahekili, unfazed by the revelation, vows to conquer Hawaiʻi.

== Release ==
The series debuted its first two episodes on August 1, 2025, with new episodes premiering weekly thereafter until September 19, 2025. Despite the series having initially been announced as a limited miniseries, Momoa and Sibbett stated in July 2025 that a second and third season could possibly be greenlit in September.

== Reception ==
The series holds a 93% approval rating on review aggregator Rotten Tomatoes, based on 45 critic reviews. The website's critics consensus reads, "Starring Jason Momoa at his ferocious best, Chief of War is a brutal epic that recreates Native Hawaiian history with commendable authenticity." On Metacritic, which uses a weighted average, the series holds a score of 71/100 based on 24 critics, indicating "generally favorable" reviews.

== Historical accuracy ==
Chief of War takes creative liberties while being based on historical events and featuring real people, like Kaʻiana and Kamehameha. John Young was a real historical figure who became a high-ranking military advisor to Kamehameha. He trained Kamehameha's warriors in the use of muskets and cannons, which were pivotal weapons in the unification wars.
