= Nāmākēhā =

Hawaiian high chief (died 1797)

Nāmākēhā (died January 1797) was a Hawaiian high chief (aliʻi) who fought on multiple sides during the unification wars in the latter 18th century with his two brothers. Originally from Maui, he and his brothers defected a number of times and resettled on different islands before they allied themselves with King Kamehameha I who would become the first monarch of a unified Hawaiian Kingdom. In 1796, he rebelled in Hilo against King Kamehameha I and was defeated, captured and killed as a human sacrifice.

== Biography ==
=== Family background ===
His name Nāmākēhā means “The lightning flash in the sky” in the Hawaiian language. Born of the aliʻi class of Hawaiian nobility, Nāmākēhā's mother Kaupekamoku, was the granddaughter of Ahia, from the ʻĪ family of Hilo, and was also a descendant of Kalehunapaikua, the fourth son of Kākuhihewa, aliʻi nui of Oʻahu. Nāmākēhā's father Kanaluihoʻae was from the ruling family of Maui and a cousin or brother of Kekaulike, aliʻi nui of Maui. He had two maternal half-brothers: Nāhiʻōleʻa (son of Kuimiheua II of Maui) and Kaʻiana (son of ʻAhuʻula-a-Keawe of Hawaiʻi Island). As a descendant of the Maui chiefess Kaʻakalani (or Kaʻakaualaninui), Nāmākēhā also possessed a specific kapu called "Kekapupoʻohoʻolewaikalā (a head so sacred that it could not be exposed to the sun except at dawn)". Elizabeth Kekaʻaniau, a later royal descendant from the same family, would explain that the kapu was only practiced on certain days and required the aliʻi to position their head to the sun from sunrise to sunset.

=== Service to Maui and Kauaʻi ===
Nāmākēhā is first mentioned during the reign of his cousin Kamehamehanui Aiʻluau, aliʻi nui of Maui. He is listed with two other chiefs of Lānaʻi: Kalaimanuia and Kealiʻiʻaʻa, as supporters of the Maui ruler. He would fight in the war of "Kapalipilo" in c. 1759 which pitted Kamehamehanui Aiʻluau against the forces of Kalaniʻōpuʻu, aliʻi nui of Hawaiʻi, over the control of the districts of Hāna and Kipahulu in East Maui.

Nāmākēhā and his brothers helped their cousin and Kamehamehanui Aiʻluau's brother and successor Kahekili II, aliʻi nui of Maui, conquer the island of Oʻahu from its aliʻi nui Kahahana in 1783. After the conquest, Kahekili set up his court at Kailua while his subordinate chiefs were sent to occupy different parts of the island. The brothers were stationed in Kāneʻohe and Heʻeia on the windward side of the island.

In 1785, the chiefs of Oʻahu led by Elani of ʻEwa, father of Kahahana, plotted to overthrow Kahekili II and ambush his forces. This conspiracy became known as the Waipiʻo Kimopo (Waipiʻo assassination). Kalaniulumoku, a nephew of Kahekili, was asked to take part in the conspiracy, and Nāmākēhā and his brothers joined in support of him. However, Kahekili II discovered the plot before it materialized and retaliated severely by killing most of the rebel Oʻahu chiefs. Many chiefs and chiefesses possessing the kapu moe (prostrating kapu) were killed or mutilated without regard to their exalted ranks. It was said that the bones of Oʻahu chiefs killed were so numerous that Kalaikoa, a chief under Kahekili, built a house named "Kauwalua" from the remains of the slain.

The three brothers escaped to Kauaʻi where they were welcomed by their cousin and Kahekili's half-brother Kāʻeokūlani who was married to the female ruler of the island, Kamakahelei. However, by 1788, the brothers were at odds with Kāʻeo.

=== Service to Kamehameha I ===
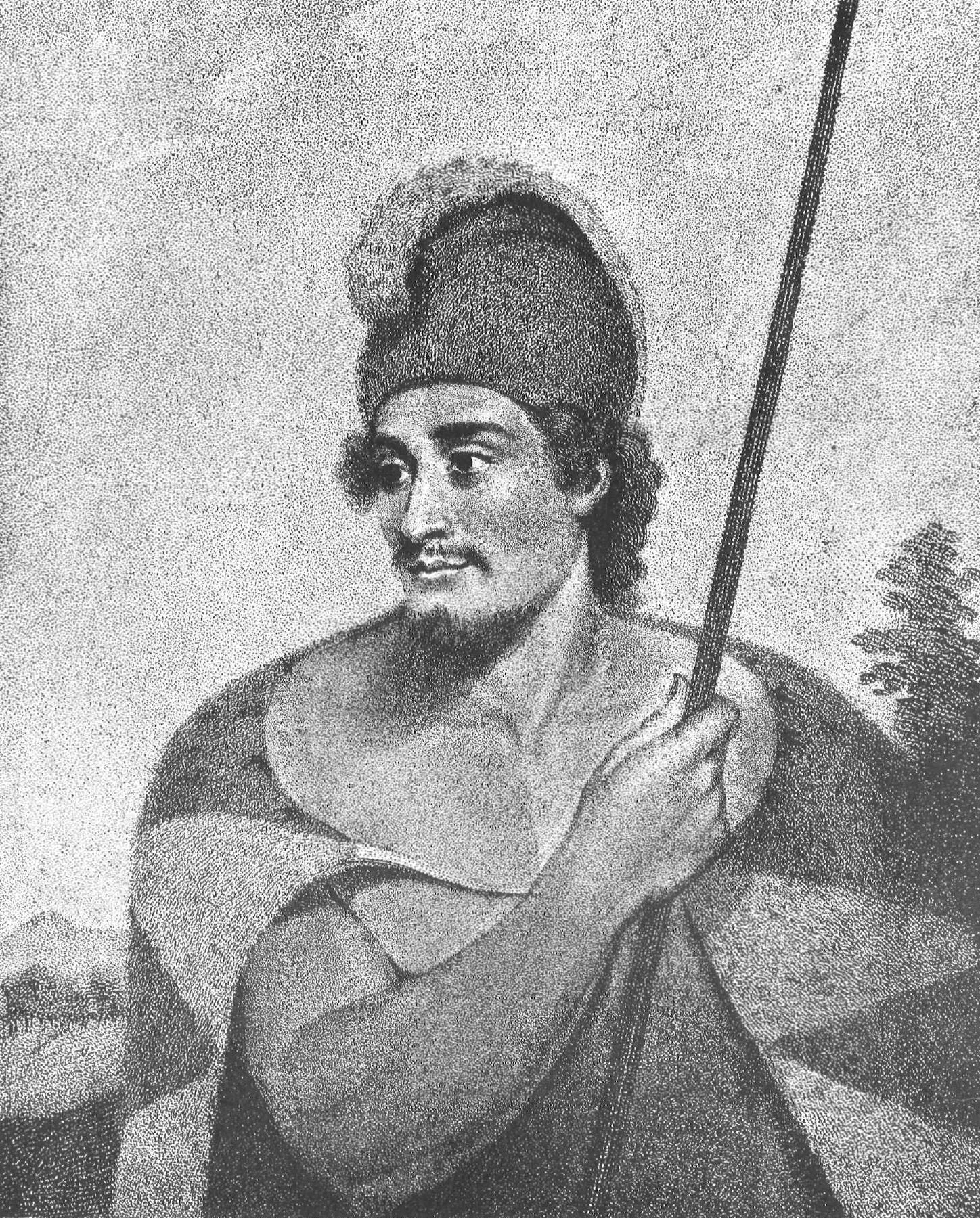
His brother Kaʻiana, lithograph after painting by Spoilum, 1787

In 1789, Nāmākēhā and his brothers sailed to Hawaiʻi Island on the ship of British explorer John Meares. Captain Meares called the two brothers "Namaatehaw" or "Namitahaw" and "Tianna" and wrote that six of Nāmākēhā's relatives (four females) along with Kaʻiana's wife and son were also given passage. At this time, the island of Hawaiʻi was divided between the Kamehameha I and his cousin Keōua Kūʻahuʻula, whom the brothers would help Kamehameha defeat and kill in 1791. Nāmākēhā would take up residence in the district of Kaʻū. In January 1793, British explorer George Vancouver visited Hawaiʻi and described how the two brothers were not favored by him and his crew because of "their turbulent, treacherous, and ungrateful dispositions." The British explorer wrote, "Nomatahah (Nāmākēhā) and Tamaahmootoo (Kameʻeiamoku) are artful, designing, and restless characters, and have dispositions to act on all occasions of hazard, or unlawful attempt, in conjunction with Tianna (Kaʻiana)." Vancouver also alluded that the two brothers were involved in the capture of the American ship Fair American.

In 1795, Nāmākēhā and his brother were ordered by Kamehameha I to join him on his campaign against Kalanikūpule, the aliʻi nui of Maui and Oʻahu and the son and successor of Kahekili II. His brothers Kaʻiana and Nāhiʻōleʻa would answer the call, but Nāmākēhā ignored the summons. According to historian Samuel Kamakau, he refused the summons because he was too ashamed to fight against Kalanikūpule. The decision was also swayed by the counsel of Kalanihuia, a kahuna (priest) of Kiwalaʻo and Keōua Kūʻahuʻula, two cousins and rivals whom Kamehameha I had killed in his conquest of Hawaiʻi Island. An alternative account, written by Captain Charles Bishop in 1796, stated that Nāmākēhā was appointed co-regent of Hawaiʻi with the British foreign advisor Isaac Davis, a survivor of the Fair American, while Kamehameha was off on his campaign. On Oʻahu, Kaʻiana and Nāhiʻōleʻa, dissatisfied with being excluded from Kamehameha's war council, defected to Kalanikūpule and were both killed at the Battle of Nuʻuanu in 1795.

=== Rebellion against Kamehameha I ===
Kamehameha I would stay on Oʻahu to prepare for an invasion of Kauaʻi and Niʻihau. In February 1796, Nāmākēhā took advantage of Kamehameha I’s absence and started an uprising in the district of Hilo. Isaac Davis was unsuccessful in stopping the rebellion. Those who opposed the rule of Kamehameha I and the former supporters of the deposed Keōua Kūʻahuʻula flocked to the forces of Nāmākēhā. The insurgents overran the neighboring districts of Kaʻū and Puna. One unnamed European was killed in the conflicts. In either August or September, Kamehameha I rushed back to Hawaii in order to pacify the rebellion. The forces of the two armies met at Kaipalaoa, South Hilo, where Kamehameha quickly destroyed the rebels. After his defeat, Nāmākēhā fled the battlefield and was pursued by Kamehameha's warriors. He was later captured and sacrificed to the war god Kūkaʻilimoku, in January 1797, at the Pinao Heiau in Piʻihonua, Hilo.

Kamehameha I would remain on Hawaiʻi from 1796 to 1802 in order to consolidate his rule and prevent any further political instability in his home island. Nāmākēhā's rebellion was the last battle which Kamehameha I fought in as he would unite the remaining independent islands of Kauaʻi and Niʻihau by diplomacy in 1810.

== Bibliography ==
- Alexander, William DeWitt (1891). A Brief History of the Hawaiian People. New York: American Book Company. OCLC 187412143.
- Bishop, Charles (2016). Roe, Michael (ed.). The Journal and Letters of Captain Charles Bishop on the North-West Coast of America, in the Pacific, and in New South Wales, 1794–1799. London: Routledge. ISBN 978-1-317-02679-2. OCLC 992196566.
- Desha, Stephen (2000). Kamehameha and His Warrior Kekūhaupiʻo. Honolulu: Kamehameha Schools Press. ISBN 978-0-87336-056-2. OCLC 248030597.
- Fornander, Abraham (1880). Stokes, John F. G. (ed.). An Account of the Polynesian Race: Its Origins and Migrations, and the Ancient History of the Hawaiian People to the Times of Kamehameha I. Vol. 2. London: Trubner & Company. OCLC 4823096. Archived from the original on June 29, 2016.
- Galois, Robert (2011). A Voyage to the North West Side of America: The Journals of James Colnett, 1786-89. Vancouver, BC: UBC Press. ISBN 978-0-7748-4001-9.
- Kamakau, Samuel (1992) [1961]. Ruling Chiefs of Hawaii (Revised ed.). Honolulu: Kamehameha Schools Press. ISBN 0-87336-014-1. OCLC 25008795.
- Kanahele, George S. (1999). Emma: Hawaii's Remarkable Queen. Honolulu: University of Hawaii Press. ISBN 978-0-8248-2240-8. OCLC 40890919.
- Kanahele, George S. (1995). Waikīkī, 100 B.C. to 1900 A.D.: An Untold Story. Honolulu: University of Hawaii Press. ISBN 978-0-8248-1790-9. OCLC 33009852.
- Kuykendall, Ralph Simpson (1965) [1938]. The Hawaiian Kingdom 1778–1854, Foundation and Transformation. Vol. 1. Honolulu: University of Hawaii Press. ISBN 0-87022-431-X. OCLC 47008868.
- McKinzie, Edith Kawelohea (1986). Stagner, Ishmael W. (ed.). Hawaiian Genealogies: Extracted from Hawaiian Language Newspapers. Vol. 2. Honolulu: University of Hawaii Press. ISBN 978-0-939154-37-1. OCLC 12555087.
- Meares, John (1790). Voyages Made in the Years 1788 and 1789, from China to the North West Coast of America. London: Printed at the Logographic Press. OCLC 2210719.
- Meares, John (1791). Voyages Made in the Years 1788 and 1789, From China to the North West Coast of America with an Introductory Narrative of a Voyage Performed in 1786, From Bengal, in the Ship Nootka. Hawaiian Historical Society Reprints. Honolulu: Hawaiian Historical Society.
- Miller, David G. (1988). "Kaʻiana, the Once Famous 'Prince of Kauaʻi'". Hawaiian Journal of History. 22. Honolulu: Hawaiian Historical Society: 1–19. hdl:10524/389. OCLC 60626541.
- Pratt, Elizabeth Kekaaniauokalani Kalaninuiohilaukapu (1920). History of Keoua Kalanikupuapa-i-nui: Father of Hawaii Kings, and His Descendants, with Notes on Kamehameha I, First King of All Hawaii. Honolulu: Honolulu Star-Bulletin. OCLC 154181545.
- Vancouver, George (2017). Lamb, W. Kaye (ed.). The Voyage of George Vancouver, 1791–1795: Volume 3. Routledge. ISBN 978-1-351-53953-1.
