= Jason Momoa =

American actor (born 1979)

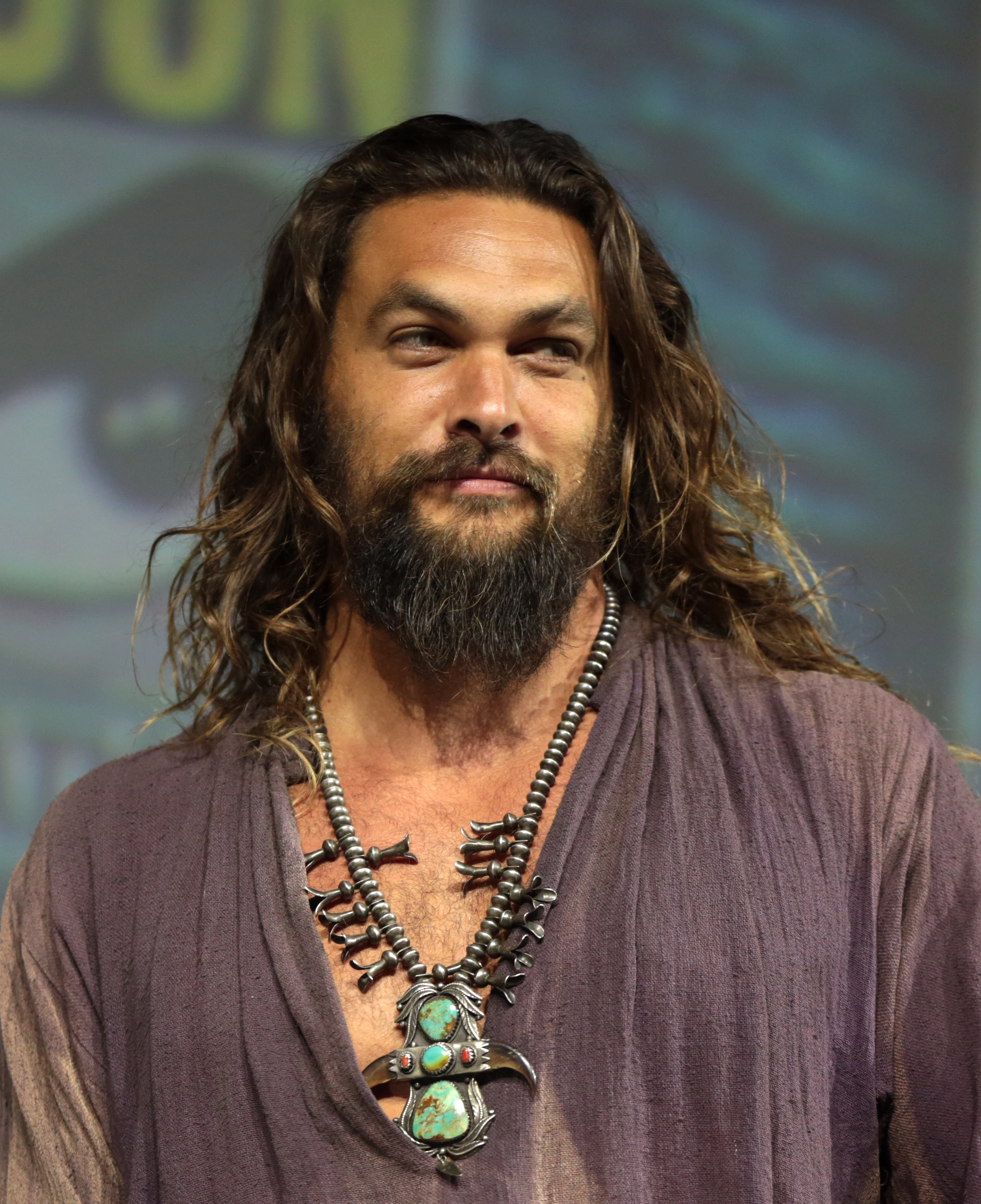
- Momoa at the 2018 San Diego Comic-Con
- Born: Joseph Jason Namakaeha Momoa; August 1, 1979 (age 47); Honolulu, Hawaii, U.S.
- Occupations: Actor; filmmaker
- Years active: 1999–present
- Spouse: Lisa Bonet (m. 2017; div. 2024)
- Children: 2

Joseph Jason Namakaeha Momoa (/məˈmoʊə/; born August 1, 1979) is an American actor and film producer. He made his acting debut as Jason Ioane on the syndicated action drama series Baywatch: Hawaii (1999–2001), which was followed by portrayals of Ronon Dex on the Syfy science fiction series Stargate Atlantis (2005–2009), and Khal Drogo in the first two seasons of the HBO fantasy drama series Game of Thrones (2011–2012). He went on to play the lead roles in the Discovery Channel historical drama series Frontier (2016–2018), and the Apple TV shows See (2019–2022) and Chief of War (2025).

Since 2016, Momoa has appeared in various DC Comics media, first portraying Aquaman in the DC Extended Universe (2016–2023) and later portraying Lobo in the succeeding DC Universe franchise. He has also played Duncan Idaho in the science fiction film Dune (2021) and his clone Hayt in the sequel Dune: Part Three (2026), and has starred in the action film Fast X (2023) and the adventure comedy film A Minecraft Movie (2025).

== Early life ==
Momoa was born on August 1, 1979, in Honolulu, Hawaii, to Coni (née Lemke), a photographer, and Joseph Momoa, a painter. He is an only child. His father is Native Hawaiian, while his mother is of German, Irish, and Pawnee ancestry. Shortly after his birth, his parents divorced and he and his mother moved to Norwalk, Iowa, where he was raised. He graduated from Norwalk High School and was a member of the school's soccer team alongside Brandon Routh. Momoa attended the University of Hawaiʻi at Mānoa.

In his early teen years, Momoa became a rock climber and boulderer when his mother took him to Custer State Park where Sylvan Lake and the Needles of South Dakota lie.

== Career ==
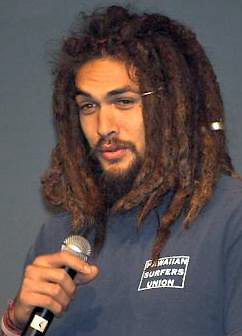
Momoa during the filming of Stargate Atlantis in 2006

At 19 years old, while living and working in Honolulu, Momoa decided to audition for the television series Baywatch Hawaii, in which he was cast as Jason Ioane (1999–2001). He was in the main cast on the 2004–2005 Fox drama North Shore as Frankie.

In 2004, Momoa appeared in the road comedy film Johnson Family Vacation. From 2005 to 2009, Momoa appeared as Ronon in Stargate Atlantis, for which he learned martial arts.

In 2009, he was cast as Roman in four episodes of the comedy-drama television series The Game (2009). He portrayed the title protagonist in Conan the Barbarian (2011), a reimagining of the 1982 film of the same name and a role made famous by Arnold Schwarzenegger. Momoa gained fame for his role of Khal Drogo on HBO's Game of Thrones. In his audition for the role, he performed a Haka, one of many intimidating Māori dances traditionally used to convey a challenge to an opponent, or a welcome to a visitor.

Momoa directed and co-wrote Road to Paloma (2014), an American drama thriller film, together with writers Jonathan Hirschbein and Robert Homer Mollohan. The film stars Momoa, Sarah Shahi, Lisa Bonet, Michael Raymond-James and Wes Studi. It premiered at the Sarasota Film Festival. The film had a limited theatrical release and a VOD release.

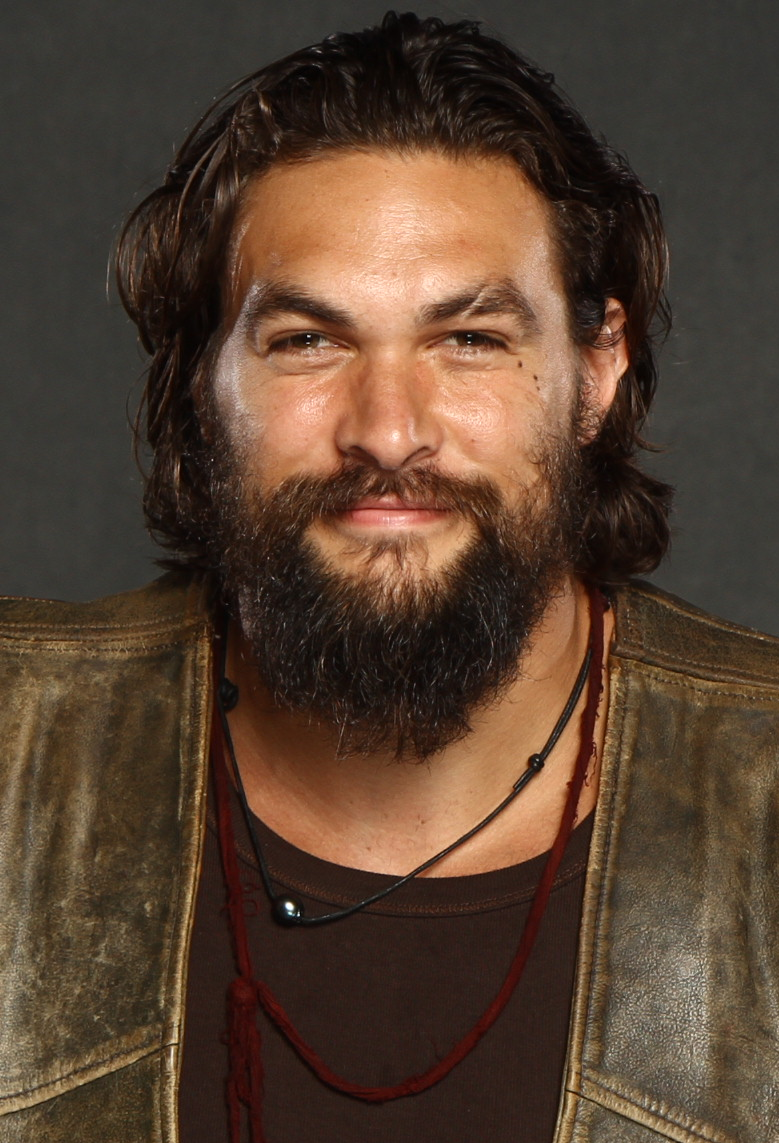
Momoa in 2014

Momoa joined the dark comedy/thriller indie Sugar Mountain (2016) alongside Cary Elwes and Haley Webb; its principal photography was done in Alaska. He also starred as Phillip Kopus, a Ramapough Mountain Indian, on the SundanceTV drama series The Red Road (2014–2015).

Momoa was reported to have been cast in the role of Arthur Curry / Aquaman, after he auditioned for Bruce Wayne / Batman. He first played the role in a cameo in the superhero film Batman v Superman: Dawn of Justice (2016), marking Aquaman's live action film debut. Momoa played the character in a leading role in the 2017 ensemble film Justice League and its director's cut, Zack Snyder's Justice League. He then starred in Aquaman (2018). He also reprised this role in The Lego Movie 2: The Second Part.

Momoa portrayed Connor in the Canadian horror action film Wolves (2014), and starred in the Sci-fi horror movie Debug; it was written and directed by Momoa's former Stargate Atlantis co-star, British-born Canadian actor David Hewlett. He portrayed a cannibal in the drama thriller film The Bad Batch (2017). Momoa appeared in the Canadian action film Braven (2018).

Between 2016 and 2018, Momoa portrayed Declan Harp in all three seasons of the Canadian historical drama television series Frontier and was an executive producer on the show. The series chronicles the North American fur trade in late 1700s Canada, and follows Declan Harp, a part-Irish, part-Cree outlaw who is campaigning to breach the Hudson's Bay Company's monopoly on the fur trade in Canada, which has become corrupt and engages in illegal activities to enrich itself.

Momoa was featured in Apple's post-apocalyptic drama series See in 2019. He played Duncan Idaho in the Denis Villeneuve film Dune (2021). He is set to return as Hayt in Dune: Part Three (2026), a ghola created in the image of Duncan Idaho.

In 2020, Momoa appeared in a halftime commercial for Rocket Mortgage for Super Bowl LIV. He also appeared in the teaser for "Scary Little Green Men" by Ozzy Osbourne from his album Ordinary Man. In 2022, Momoa joined the cast of the tenth Fast & Furious film titled Fast X as the main villain, Dante Reyes, the son of Hernan Reyes (Joaquim de Almeida), the main antagonist killed by Luke Hobbs (Dwayne Johnson) in Fast Five. Fast X is produced by and stars Vin Diesel.

In 2023, Momoa made his final outings as Aquaman, beginning with an uncredited cameo in the post-credits scene of The Flash, and then reprising his main character role in his solo films sequel Aquaman and the Lost Kingdom. In 2024, he filmed a role in the comedy film Carnival: At the End of Days.

Momoa starred as Kaʻiana in Apple's historical drama series Chief of War (2025). Momoa is also the series' co-creator and executive producer.

Momoa played Lobo in the DC Universe film Supergirl (2026). Momoa is also slated to play the role of Blanka in a Street Fighter reboot film.

== Music ==
Momoa is a fan of heavy metal music and has noted that he "build[s] [his] characters off of metal songs". He invited members of Archspire for cameo appearances in the first episode of the TV series See, and he also practiced proper screaming technique with the vocalist of Archspire, Oli Peters, for a significant scene in the series. In 2020, Momoa was featured in the song "Doom" by black metal band Scour. Momoa is a hobby musician and plays bass guitar, mandolin, ukulele and guitar in his spare time, the first of which he took up after listening to Tool's song "Sober". In 2024, Momoa formed the power trio ÖOF TATATÁ alongside longtime friends Kenny Dale Borill and Mike Hayes, performing at Nashville's Cannery Hall in May. The band performed a one-off show in Auckland, New Zealand in August.

In July 2025 he hosted Black Sabbath and Ozzy Osbourne's farewell concert, "Back to the Beginning" in Birmingham, England.

== Personal life ==
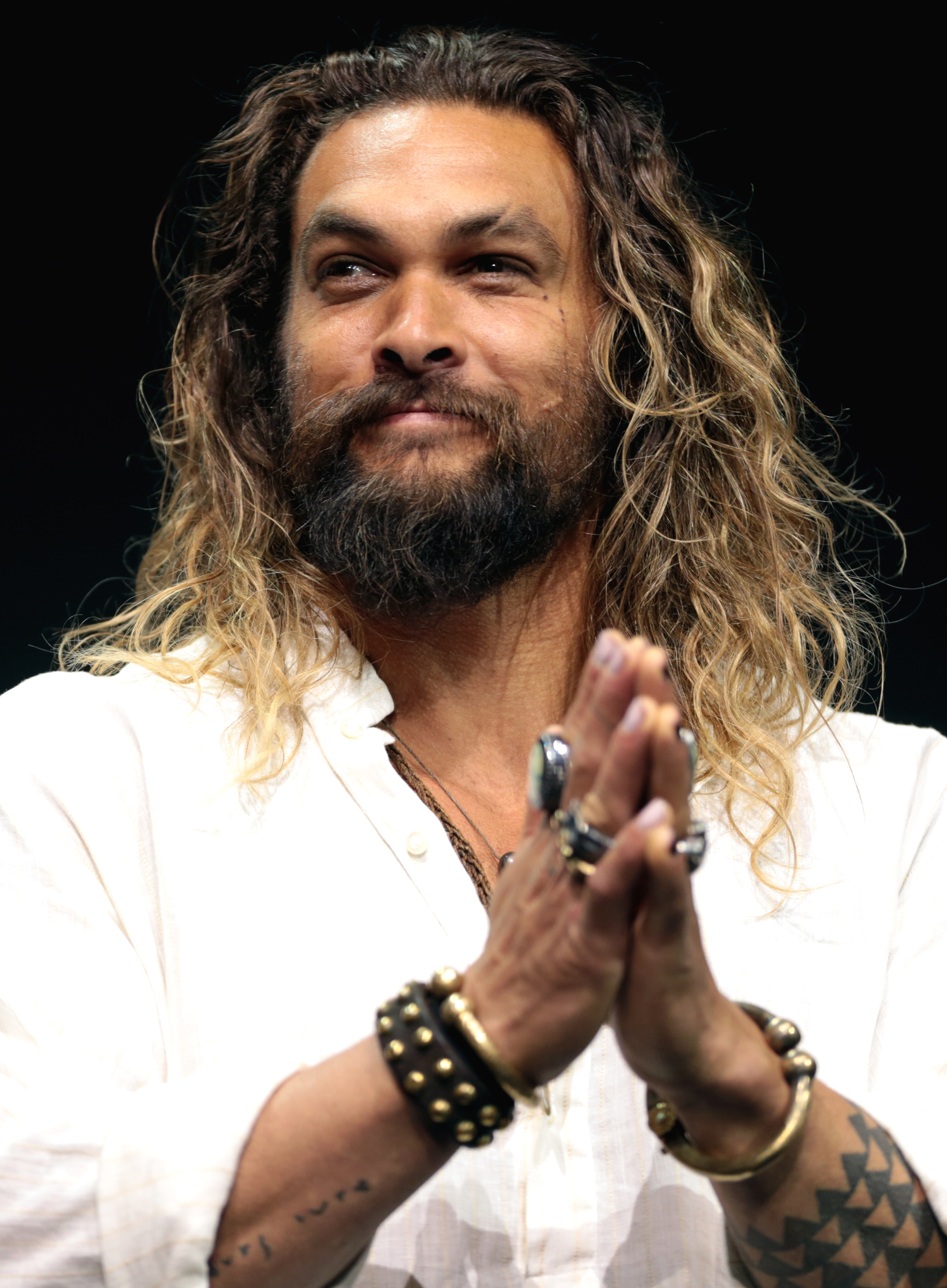
Momoa in July 2017

Momoa met his first fiancée, actress Simmone Jade Mackinnon, on the set of Baywatch in 1999. They were together for six years and became engaged in 2004. Mackinnon and Momoa called off their engagement after Momoa began a relationship with actress Lisa Bonet in 2005.

Although it was previously believed that Momoa and Bonet had married on November 15, 2007, the couple did not marry until October 2017. Daughter Lola Iolani was born in July 2007, and son Nakoa-Wolf Manakauapo Namakaeha was born in December 2008. In January 2022, Momoa and Bonet announced their split. In January 2024, Bonet filed for divorce, citing irreconcilable differences and listing their date of separation as October 7, 2020. On July 9, 2024, the divorce was finalized. As of 2024, Momoa is in a relationship with actress Adria Arjona.

In 2017, Momoa began practicing Brazilian jiu-jitsu.

In 2019, he participated in protests against the building of the Thirty Meter Telescope on Mauna Kea, a holy spiritual site for native Hawaiians.

Momoa has numerous tattoos, including a half sleeve on his left forearm, a tribute to his family god, or ʻaumakua.

=== Facial scar ===
On November 15, 2008, Momoa was slashed across the face with a broken beer glass during an altercation at the Birds Cafe, a tavern in Los Angeles, California. He received approximately 140 stitches during reconstructive surgery and the scar through his left eyebrow is apparent in his later work. The assailant was sentenced to five years in prison for the attack.

=== Advocacy ===
Momoa is an UNEP advocate who is dedicated to protecting the global oceans and coral reefs.

== Filmography ==
=== Film ===
Key
| † | Denotes productions that have not yet been released |

| Year | Title | Role | Notes | Ref. |
|---|---|---|---|---|
| 2004 | Johnson Family Vacation | Navarro | | |
| 2007 | Pipeline | Kai | | |
| 2010 | Brown Bag Diaries: Ridin' the Blinds in B Minor | Mikey | Short film; also director, screenwriter and executive producer | |
| 2011 | Conan the Barbarian | Conan the Barbarian | | |
| 2012 | Bullet to the Head | Keegan | | |
| 2014 | Road to Paloma | Robert Wolf | Also director, producer and co-writer | |
| 2014 | Debug | I Am | | |
| 2014 | Wolves | Connor Slaughter | | |
| 2016 | Batman v Superman: Dawn of Justice | Arthur Curry / Aquaman | Cameo appearance | |
| 2016 | Sugar Mountain | Joe Bright | | |
| 2017 | Once Upon a Time in Venice | Spider | | |
| 2017 | The Bad Batch | Miami Man | | |
| 2017 | Justice League | Arthur Curry / Aquaman | | |
| 2018 | Braven | Joe Braven | Also producer | |
| 2018 | Aquaman | Arthur Curry / Aquaman | | |
| 2019 | The Lego Movie 2: The Second Part | Arthur Curry / Aquaman | Voice role | |
| 2020 | Gather | Himself | Documentary film; also executive producer | |
| 2021 | Zack Snyder's Justice League | Arthur Curry / Aquaman | Director's cut of Justice League | |
| 2021 | Sweet Girl | Ray Cooper | Also producer | |
| 2021 | Dune | Duncan Idaho | | |
| 2022 | Slumberland | Flip | | |
| 2022 | The Last Manhunt | Big Jim | Also co-story writer and executive producer | |
| 2023 | Fast X | Dante Reyes | | |
| 2023 | The Flash | Arthur Curry / Aquaman | Uncredited post-credits appearance | |
| 2023 | Aquaman and the Lost Kingdom | Arthur Curry / Aquaman | Also co-story writer | |
| 2024 | The Fall Guy | Himself | Uncredited cameo appearance | |
| 2024 | The Trainer | Himself | Cameo appearance | |
| 2025 | A Minecraft Movie | Garrett "The Garbage Man" Garrison | Also producer | |
| 2025 | In the Hand of Dante | Rosario | | |
| 2026 | The Wrecking Crew | Jonny Hale | Also producer | |
| 2026 | Supergirl | Lobo | | |
| 2026 | Street Fighter | Blanka | Voice and motion capture | |
| 2026 | Dune: Part Three † | Hayt | Post-production | |
| 2027 | Animal Friends † | Bear (voice) | Post-production | |
| 2027 | A Minecraft Movie Squared † | Garrett "The Garbage Man" Garrison | Filming; also producer | |
| TBA | Protecting Jared † | | Post-production; also producer | |
| TBA | Copperhead † | | Filming | |

=== Television ===
| Year | Title | Role | Notes | Ref. |
|---|---|---|---|---|
| 1999–2001 | Baywatch: Hawaii | Jason Ioane | Main role; 38 episodes (seasons 10–11) | |
| 2003 | Baywatch: Hawaiian Wedding | Jason Ioane | Television film | |
| 2003 | Tempted | Kala | Television film | |
| 2004–2005 | North Shore | Frankie Seau | Main role; 21 episodes | |
| 2005–2009 | Stargate Atlantis | Ronon Dex | Main role; 73 episodes (seasons 2–5) | |
| 2009 | The Game | Roman | Recurring role; 4 episodes (season 3) | |
| 2011–2012 | Game of Thrones | Khal Drogo | Recurring role (season 1), Guest role (season 2); 11 episodes | |
| 2014–2015 | The Red Road | Phillip Kopus | Main role; 12 episodes | |
| 2014–2015 | Drunk History | Jim Thorpe | Episode: "Sports Heroes" | |
| 2014–2015 | Drunk History | Jean Lafitte | Episode: "New Orleans" | |
| 2016–2018 | Frontier | Declan Harp | Main role; 18 episodes (also executive producer) | |
| 2018–2026 | Saturday Night Live | Himself | 2 episodes as host; 2 episodes as special guest | |
| 2019 | The Simpsons | Himself | Voice role; Episode: "The Fat Blue Line" | |
| 2019–2022 | See | Baba Voss | Main role; 24 episodes | |
| 2022 | Peacemaker | Arthur Curry / Aquaman | Episode: "It's Cow or Never" | |
| 2023 | The Climb | Himself | Docuseries; 8 episodes | |
| 2024 | On the Roam | Himself | Host; 8 episodes Also director and executive producer (5 episodes) | |
| 2025 | Chief of War | Kaʻiana | Lead role; 9 episodes (also co-creator, writer, and executive producer); Directed episode: "The Black Desert" | |
| 2026 | Saturday Night Live | Hagrid | Episode: "Finn Wolfhard/ASAP Rocky" | |

=== Video games ===
| Year | Title | Role | Notes | Ref. |
|---|---|---|---|---|
| 2020 | Fortnite Battle Royale | Arthur Curry / Aquaman | Based on likeness | |
| 2025 | Minecraft | Garrett "The Garbage Man" Garrison | A Minecraft Movie live event | |

== Awards and nominations ==
| Year | Award | Category | Work | Result | Ref. |
|---|---|---|---|---|---|
| 2011 | CinemaCon Awards | Male Rising Star | Conan the Barbarian & Game of Thrones | Won | |
| 2011 | Scream Awards | Best Ensemble | Game of Thrones | Nominated | |
| 2011 | Screen Actors Guild Awards | Outstanding Performance by an Ensemble in a Drama Series | Game of Thrones | Nominated | |
| 2017 | Canadian Screen Awards | Best Actor in a Continuing Leading Dramatic Role | Frontier | Nominated | |
| 2019 | Nickelodeon Kids' Choice Awards | Favorite Movie Actor | Aquaman | Nominated | |
| 2019 | Nickelodeon Kids' Choice Awards | Favorite Superhero | Aquaman | Nominated | |
| 2019 | MTV Movie & TV Awards | Best Kiss (shared with Amber Heard) | Aquaman | Nominated | |
| 2019 | Teen Choice Awards | Choice Sci-Fi/Fantasy Movie Actor | Aquaman | Nominated | |
| 2023 | Hollywood Critics Association Midseason Film Awards | Best Supporting Actor | Fast X | Runner-up | |
| 2024 | Critics' Choice Super Awards | Best Villain in a Movie | Fast X | Nominated | |
| 2024 | People's Choice Awards | The Action Movie Star of the Year | Aquaman and the Lost Kingdom | Nominated | |
| 2024 | Nickelodeon Kids' Choice Awards | Favorite Movie Actor | Aquaman and the Lost Kingdom | Nominated | |
| 2025 | Nickelodeon Kids' Choice Awards | Favorite Movie Actor | A Minecraft Movie | Nominated | |
| 2026 | Film Independent Spirit Awards | Best Ensemble Cast in a New Scripted Series | Chief of War | Won | |
