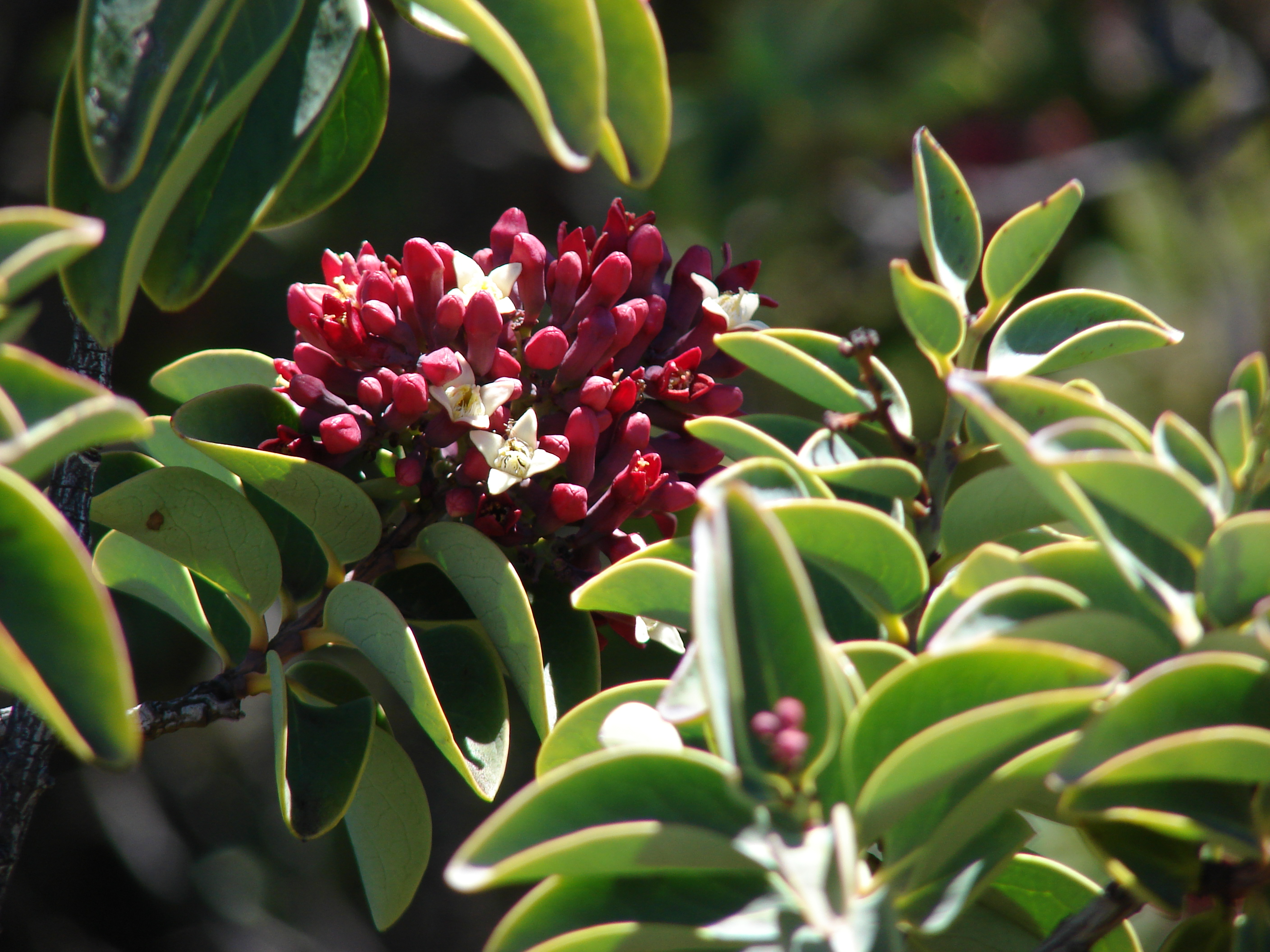

Conservation status
- Endangered (IUCN 3.1)

Scientific classification
- Kingdom: Plantae
- Clade: Tracheophytes
- Clade: Angiosperms
- Clade: Eudicots
- Order: Santalales
- Family: Santalaceae
- Genus: Santalum
- Species: S. haleakalae

Binomial name
- Santalum haleakalae Hillebr.

= Santalum haleakalae =

Species of tree

Santalum haleakalae, known as Haleakala sandalwood or ʻIliahi in Hawaiian, is a species of flowering tree in the sandalwood family, that is endemic to the islands of Maui, Lanai, and Molokai in the Hawaiian Islands, part of the United States. It grows in subalpine shrublands at elevations of 1,900 to 2,700 m (6,200 to 8,900 ft), especially on the slopes of Haleakalā.

== Description ==
This is a shrub or small tree with green, ovate leaves that are often glaucous and tinged purple, especially in var. halekalae. The flowers are cream-colored to red in bud and cream to white when open, arranged in tight compound cymes. The fruit are reddish to black drupes.

== Range ==
Santalum haleakalae var. haleakalae occurs only on the slopes of Haleakalā on Maui. Santalum haleakalae var. lanaiense occurs on the islands of Lanai, Molokai, and Maui.

== Habitat ==
Santalum haleakalae var. haleakalae occupies subalpine and montane mesic forests, while Santalum haleakalae var. lanaiense occupies wet shrublands.

== Ecology ==
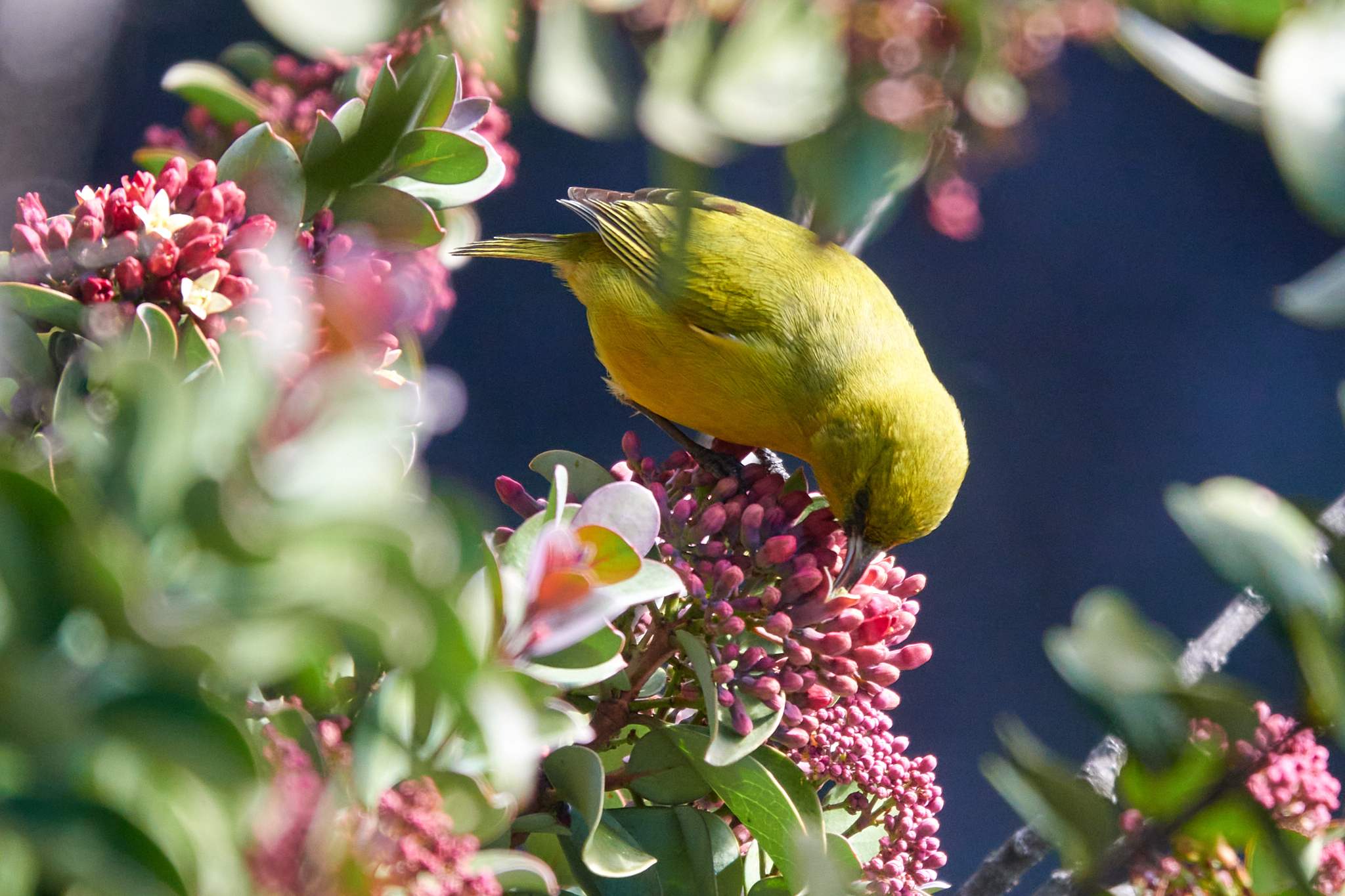
Maui ʻamakihi feeding on nectar

Like most sandalwoods, Santalum haleakalae is a hemiparasite, deriving some of its nutrition from the roots of surrounding plants, and Santalum haleakalae var. lanaiense is thought to use koa (Acacia koa) as a host (among other native trees). Their flowers provide nectar for native Hawaiian honeycreepers like the Maui ʻamakihi.

== Human use ==
Native Hawaiians used ‘iliahi (including other native members of this genus) for a variety of medicinal purposes, perfuming kapa, and making musical instruments. After learning of the lucrative global market in sandalwood in the late 18th century, Hawaiian nobles forced people of lower castes to harvest the wood of this and related trees, many of whom suffered or died in the process, resulting in famine due to abandoning food crops. Hawaii was so well known in China for its sandalwood that people in the Macau area referred to it as "Tan Heung Shan," or "the Sandalwood Mountains." The trade in Hawaiian sandalwood ended around the middle of the 19th century, and while many ‘iliahi populations have recovered, large, old trees remain difficult to find.

== Etymology ==
The specific and varietal epithet haleakalae comes from Haleakalā, the volcano to which that variety is endemic. The varietal epithet lanaiense comes from the island of Lanai, one of the islands where that variety occurs.

== Taxonomy ==
Research in 2010 determined that the Santalum freycinetianum was polyphyletic and the variety Santalum freycinetianum var. lanaiense was most closely related to S. haleakalae. The authors combined them as two varieties of the same species, Santalum haleakalae var. haleakalae for the plants on Haleakalā and Santalum haleakalae var. lanaiense for the plants elsewhere on Maui as well as on Lanai and Molokai.
