= Kaina Makua =

American actor, businessman, and athlete

- Education: BA, University of Hawaii
- Occupations: Businessman, taro farmer, outrigger canoe paddling coach, actor
- Notable credit: Kamehameha I in Chief of War

Kaina Makua is a Native Hawaiian taro farmer, outrigger canoe athlete, businessman and actor. He is known for portraying Kamehameha I in the television miniseries Chief of War (2025).

== Life and career ==
Kaina Makua is patrilineally descended from Kamehameha house line. Aside from businessmaking, he is widely known for coaching various outrigger canoe teams. Notably representing Kauai region in 2022 International Va’a Federation World Sprints.

Makua also appears in Haututu Hunters (2023).
