= James Udom =

American-Nigeria actor

- Born: Akwaibom
- Occupation: Actor
- Years active: 2013–present
- Notable credit: Seyton in The Tragedy of Macbeth

James Udom is an American-Nigerian male actor. He is known for his roles as Seyton in The Tragedy of Macbeth (2021), Mitch in Echo 3 (2022–2023) and Tony in Chief of War (2025).
