= Benjamin Hoetjes =

Dutch-Australian actor

- Occupation(s): Actor, model
- Years active: 2009–present
- Notable credit: John Young in Chief of War

Benjamin Hoetjes is Dutch-Australian actor and model. He is best known for his roles as England advisor for Hawaii Kingdom, John Young in Chief of War (2025).

== Filmography ==
=== Film ===
Year	Title	Role	Notes	Ref.
2012	From Here	Himself	short film	
2015	I Am Evangeline	Ten	Australian indie film, co-star with Georgia Flood	
2017	Home and Away: All or Nothing	The Bandit		
2020	Black Water: Abyss	Viktor	Sequel of Black Water, Main character	
2023	Choose Love	Florian		

=== Television ===
Year	Title	Role	Notes	Ref.
2016	The Code	Anton	6 episodes	
2017	Knightfall	Angus	1 episodes	
2018	Mystery Road	Eric Hoffman	3 episodes	
2025	Chief of War	John Young	Main character, 8 episodes	
