= Fair American =

American sailing vessel

History

United States
- Name: Fair American
- Launched: 1784
- Captured: By Native Hawaiians, 1790

Hawaiian Kingdom
- Name: Fair American
- Acquired: 1790

General characteristics
- Class & type: schooner or brig
- Tons burthen: 26 (bm)
- Length: 33 ft (10 m)
- Beam: 8 ft (2.4 m)
- Propulsion: Sail
- Crew: 4

Fair American was a small American sailing vessel described variously as a schooner or sloop or brig. Purchased for use in the maritime fur trade on the Pacific Northwest coast, Fair American sailed from Macau to Nootka Sound on Vancouver Island in 1789. At Nootka Sound she was captured by the Spanish Navy during the Nootka Crisis. Taken to San Blas, Mexico, the vessel, its teenage skipper, Thomas Humphrey Metcalfe, and crew of four were soon released. Hoping to rendezvous with his father, Simon Metcalfe, Thomas Metcalfe sailed to Hawaii. Attacked by Native Hawaiians, Fair American was captured and all were killed except for crewman Isaac Davis. The vessel then came under the control of Kamehameha I, as did Isaac Davis and John Young, a crewman from Simon Metcalfe's ship Eleanora, and Isaac Ridler, a crewmember of John Kendrick's Columbia Rediviva, who had been left on Hawaii. The Fair American, crewed by Native Hawaiians under the advisement of Davis and Young, played an important role in Kamehameha's conquest of Maui and Oahu, and the creation of the Hawaiian Kingdom.

== Description ==
Descriptions of the Fair American vary in details but agree in general that she was a schooner or sloop or brig of 26 tons, 33 feet (10 m) long, and 8 feet (2.4 m) wide. In 1793 George Vancouver described the Fair American thus: "The vessel in question had been a pleasure boat and was lengthened at China. Her gunwale was not a foot higher than that of the double canoes of this country [Hawaii], and being navigated and protected by five persons only under the command of an inexperienced young man, she became not less a desirable acquisition to Tamaahmootoo than a prize of easy attainment". One of Vancouver's officers, after seeing the Fair American, wrote that he was "Stuck with Surprize, at so small a Vessel having been employ'd on such a Commercial pursuit as she had been, and to have travers'd Such an immense tract of Boisterous Ocean as she had done."

== Voyage to Nootka Sound ==
There is little information about Fair American before 1789. According to historian Mary Malloy, Fair American was built in New Jersey in 1784.

In 1789 the American trader Simon Metcalfe was in Macau, China, with his ship Eleanora. He was intending to take a cargo of tea to New York City. But while in Guangzhou (Canton) or Macau, he heard about the possibility of making large profits trading sea otter furs in China. Metcalfe decided to sail to the Pacific Northwest Coast to acquire sea otter furs before returning to China to buy tea. An English captain recommended taking a second, smaller ship to serve as tender and to more easily navigate narrow fjords. To this end he purchased the Fair American in Macau. Command was given to Simon's son, Thomas Humphrey Metcalfe. The small vessel had a crew of four, plus Thomas Metcalfe, who was 18 years old.

The Eleanora, under Simon Metcalfe, and the Fair American, under Thomas Metcalfe, left Macau in May 1789, intending to sail together, but they were separated during a storm in the South China Sea. Thomas Metcalfe was left to find his own way across the ocean in the Fair American. His only navigational instrument was a compass, which broke en route. His only guide was a copy of a map made by James Cook. Cook's map provided a general impression of the North Pacific coast but lacked detail.

Thomas sailed the Fair American north along the Japanese archipelago, the Kuriles, and the Aleutian Islands. After 42 days at sea he stopped at a Russian fur-trade post on Unalaska Island, where the Russian commander Potak Zaikov provided flour and dried fish. Thomas continued down the Pacific Northwest Coast, acquiring some furs through trade with some Tlingit and Haida villages, before arriving at Nootka Sound. In the vicinity of Dixon Entrance he encountered and briefly met with John Kendrick, who was sailing Lady Washington to Haida Gwaii. According to Esteban José Martínez, the Spanish commander at Nootka Sound, Thomas Metcalfe's Fair American arrived with "her mast sprung and her sails split", and that the schooner had no provisions left but only "some casks of water and some 65 otter skins". In addition, Martínez noted that Thomas Metcalfe had "no written passport or instructions and no papers except his diary", and that his sole compass was broken.

Martínez, an experienced sailor who had been to Alaska the year before, was impressed. About Thomas he wrote: "He is but a boy, who under his father's orders undertook such an extended voyage. He and his men were exposed to the greatest dangers from rough weather and lack of provisions. They sailed over the open sea for more than three thousand leagues [over 7,700 miles (12,400 km)]. They were exposed to a thousand insults from the heathen and driven by necessity had to seek a meeting with the Spaniards, from which they expected relief."

== Capture at Nootka Sound ==
In 1789 both Simon Metcalfe and his son Thomas were caught up in the Nootka Crisis at Nootka Sound. As increasing numbers of trading ships visited Nootka Sound, Spain decided to assert its claim to the Pacific Northwest Coast. In early 1789 a Spanish force under Martínez arrived and established Santa Cruz de Nuca and Fort San Miguel.

Thomas Metcalfe sailed Fair American into Nootka Sound on 20 October 1789, whereupon the vessel and crew were promptly seized and arrested. Martínez left Nootka for the Spanish naval base at San Blas, Mexico, on 31 October 1789. He sailed with several ships including the captured Fair American, which was put under the command of John Kendrick Jr.

On the way to San Blas a storm forced the Fair American to seek shelter at Monterey, California. Thomas Metcalfe and his crew spent about ten days in prison in Monterey. Then they continued south, arriving at San Blas on 6 December 1789, where Metcalfe and his men were again imprisoned. The Spanish viceroy, Juan Vicente de Güemes, 2nd Count of Revillagigedo, was worried about the possibility of international crisis sparked by the seizure of three British merchant ships as well as the Fair American. Deciding to focus solely on Britain, he ordered the immediate release of Thomas Metcalfe, his men and ship. Later the viceroy decided it would be better to escort the Fair American back to Nootka Sound before releasing her. But by the time the news reached San Blas, Thomas Metcalfe was already sailing the Fair American to Hawaii.

== Release and events in Hawaii ==
The Metcalfes had planned to spend the winter in the Hawaiian Islands, which were independent and only just beginning to be visited by outsiders. After being released from San Blas, Thomas Metcalfe sailed the Fair American to Hawaii, hoping to rendezvous with his father. Reaching the Island of Hawaiʻi, Thomas Metcalfe brought Fair American into Kawaihae Bay, where shortly before his father Simon had flogged Chief Kameʻeiamoku, who had then vowed revenge upon the next ship.

On 16 March 1790, Kameʻeiamoku's men easily captured the Fair American and killed everyone except Isaac Davis, who was badly injured but survived. Kameʻeiamoku appropriated the ship, its guns, ammunition, and other valuable goods, as well as Isaac Davis himself. At the time no one was aware of the family relation between the captain of the Fair American and Simon Metcalfe, whose Eleanora was anchored at Kealakekua Bay, about 30 miles (50 km) away.

== Hawaiian vessel ==
The Fair American was commandeered by King Kamehameha I. The vessel became the first foreign style vessel in Kamehameha's war fleet. In the aftermath of the capture of Fair American, and with Simon Metcalfe nearby, who had just killed about 100 Hawaiians in the Olowalu Massacre, Kamehameha had the Fair American hidden and forbid any contact with Simon Metcalfe's Eleanora. After a few days the elder Metcalfe, sensing danger or becoming frustrated, left and set sail for China, not knowing that his son had been murdered not far away. He never learned about the attack on Fair American or the fate of his son.

These events mark a turning point in Hawaiian history. John Young and Isaac Davis were instrumental in Kamehameha's military ventures and his eventual conquest and Unification of Hawaii. Young and Davis became respected translators and military advisors for Kamehameha. Their skill in gunnery, as well as cannon from the Fair American, helped Kamehameha win many battles, including the Battle of Kepaniwai, later in 1790, where the forces of Maui were defeated.

In retaliation for the invasion of Maui Kahekili II and his brother Kaʻeokulani led a fleet of 700 war canoes in an attack on the north coast of Hawaii. Kamehameha met them with his own fleet, including Fair American, and drove them off after a long naval battle off the shore of the Waipio Valley. The battle became known as the Battle of Kepuwahaulaula, meaning "Battle of the Red Mouthed Guns", after the use of cannon and firearms on both sides. This battle probably took place in April or May, 1791.

The Fair American continued to be an important vessel in Kamehameha's navy. In 1794 the fur trading vessel Jefferson, under Captain Josiah Roberts, encountered the Fair American in Hawaii. Roberts wrote that the vessel was "navigated altogether by natives", and that its captain was also a Native Hawaiian.

== See also ==
- Nootka Convention
- List of historical ships in British Columbia
