= Spoilum =

Chinese artist (c.1765–1805)

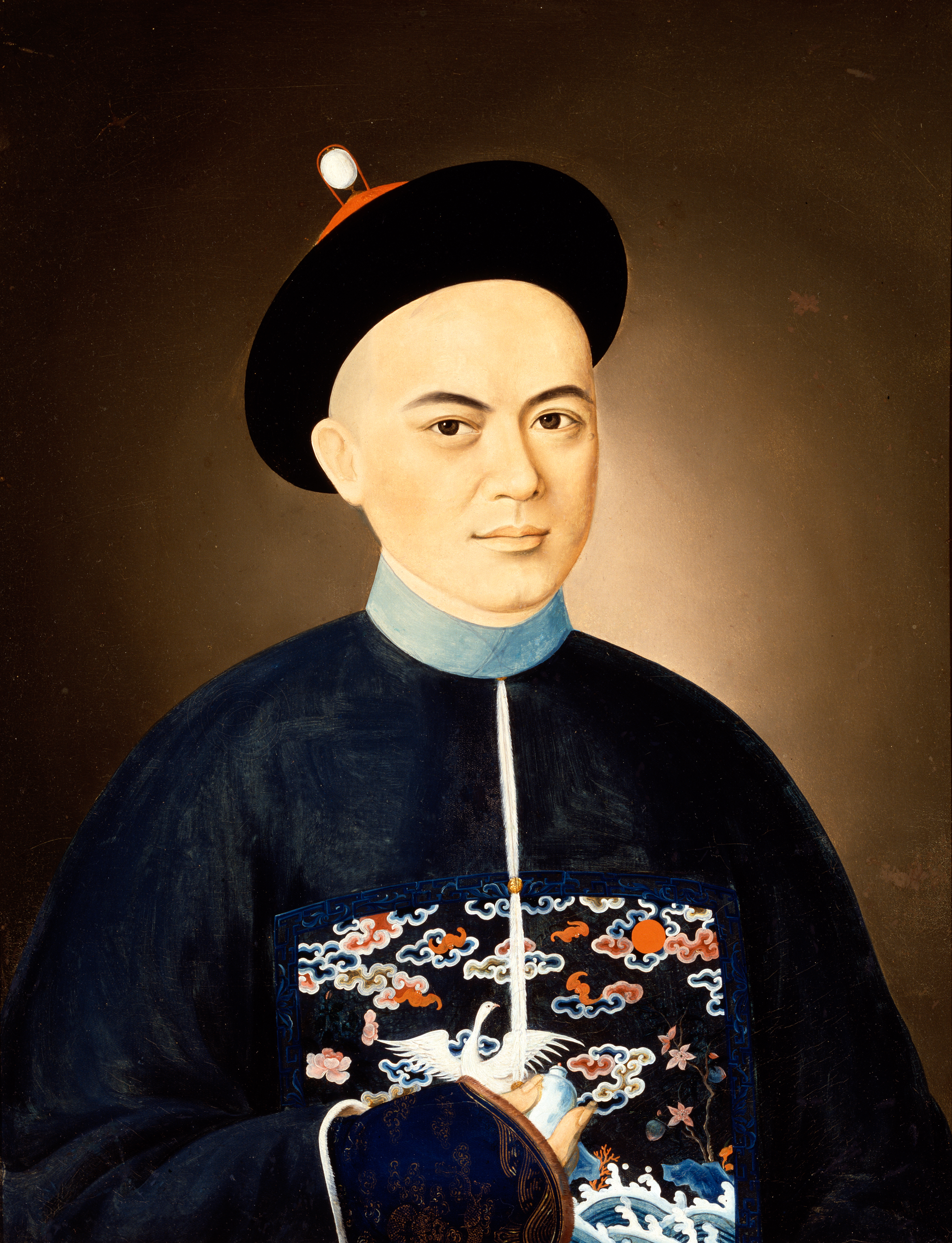
Portrait of Eshing, by Spoilum

Spoilum (active 1765–1805; Chinese: 關作霖; pinyin: Guan Zuolin) was a Chinese artist active in Guangzhou between 1785 and 1810, during the Old China Trade. He was the earliest oil painter in Canton. He painted portraits of Chinese and Western merchants and sea captains in the Western style painting with oil on canvas rather than ink on paper or silk in the Chinese style. He created paintings of Chinese hong merchants Eshing (silk merchant) and Puan Kee Qua. His portraits of Western merchants typically required a two- or three-hour sitting, and cost $10. He also mastered the European technique of reverse glass painting. Little is known of his life, although he was one of a family of painters, including his grandson Lam Qua, and is said to have traveled extensively in the West.
