= Auld =

Auld is a Scottish surname meaning "old". Notable people with the name include:

- A. Graeme Auld, British Old Testament scholar
- Alex Auld (born 1981), Canadian hockey player
- Andrew Auld (1799–1873), Scottish ship's carpenter in Hawaii
- Andy Auld (1900–1977), Scottish-American soccer player
- Audrey Auld-Mezera, musical artist
- Bertie Auld (1938–2021), Scottish football player and manager
- Bill Auld, Scottish international rugby union player
- Brian Auld, American baseball executive
- Cathy Auld, Canadian curler
- Doug Auld (born 1962), American editor and publisher of Sprint Car & Midget Magazine
- Elizabeth Auld (1901–1998), Australian journalist and writer
- Eric Auld (1931–2013), Scottish painter
- Eva Auld Watson, American painter
- F. H. Auld (1881–1961), Canadian agricultural scientist and Saskatchewan's Deputy Minister of Agriculture
- Georgie Auld (1919–1990), Canadian-American jazz tenor saxophonist, clarinetist and bandleader
- Gertrude Auld Thomas (1872–1959), American soprano and composer
- Isabel Auld (1917–2016), Canadian volunteer and the first female chancellor of the University of Manitoba
- James Auld (disambiguation), multiple people
- Jenny Auld, Scottish politician
- Jim Auld (1889–1974), New Zealand international rugby league footballer
- John Auld (disambiguation), multiple people
- Margaret Auld (1932–2010), Scottish nurse, Marion, and Chief Nursing Officer of Scotland 1977–1988
- Mary Auld, Scottish politician and women's organizer
- Patrick Auld, Australian winemaker, father of W. P. Auld
- Robert Auld (disambiguation), multiple people
- Robin Auld (judge) (born 1937), judge in the English Court of Appeal
- Robin Auld (musician) (born 1959), South African singer-songwriter, guitarist, poet and writer
- Susan Mary Auld, UK naval architect
- W. P. Auld (1840–1912), Australian explorer, wine maker and merchant
- William Auld (1924–2006), Scottish author and Esperanto leader
- William Auld Tait, Canadian politician and pioneer

== See also ==
- Auld Lang Syne
- Auld Mound
- Auld Reekie
- Aulds (surname)
- Ault (disambiguation)
- Old (surname)
- Ould (surname)
