= Edgar and Lucy Henriques House =

Historic house in Hawaii, United States

- U.S. National Register of Historic Places
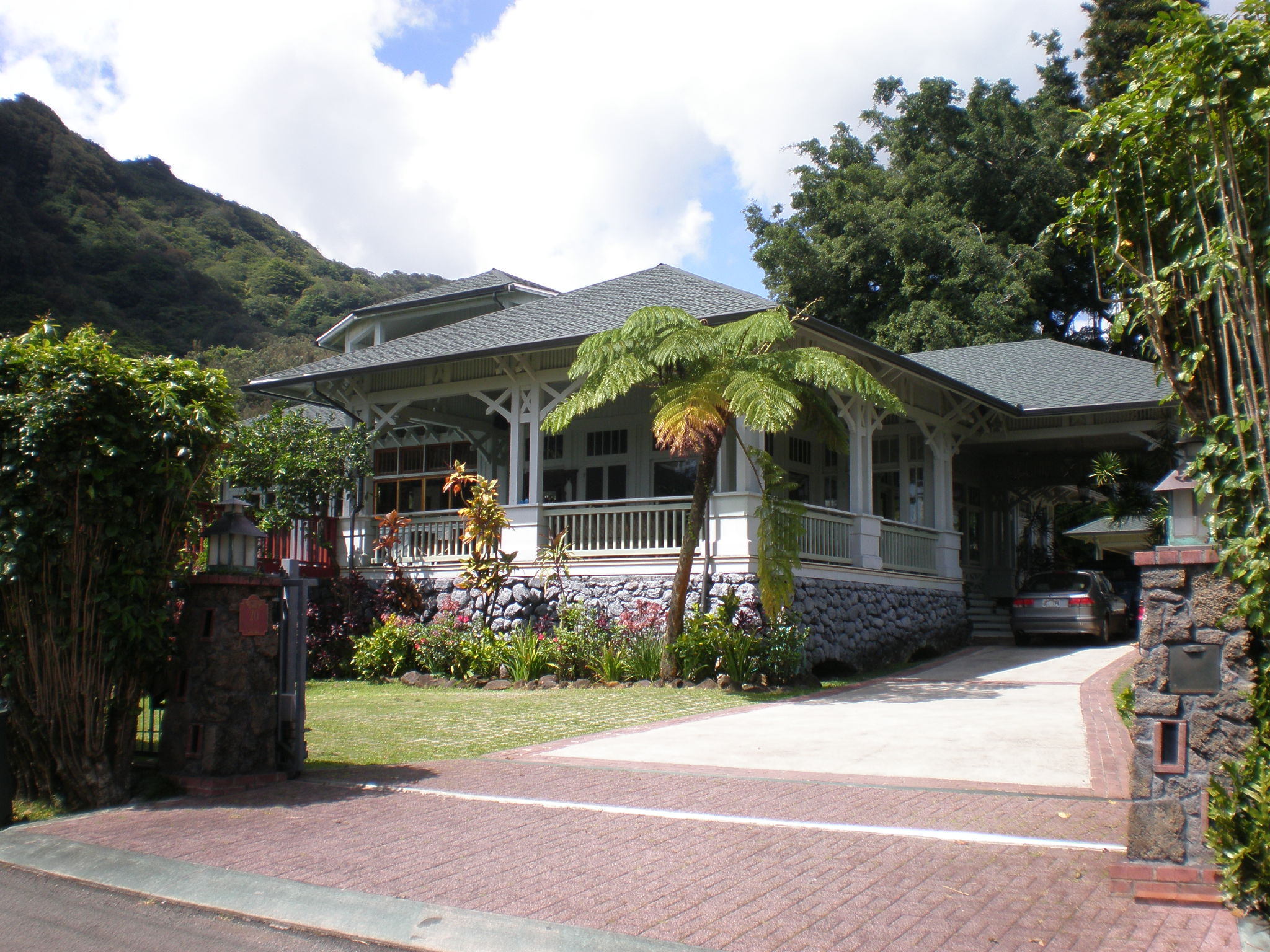
- Edgar and Lucy Henriques House

- Location within Hawaii
- Location: 20 Old Pali Place, Honolulu, Hawaii
- Coordinates: 21°20′48″N 157°49′36″W
- Area: 0.5 acres (0.20 ha)
- Built: 1904
- Architect: Thomas Gill
- Architectural style: Kamaaina
- NRHP reference No.: 84000202
- Added to NRHP: November 1, 1984

The Edgar and Lucy Henriques House at 20 Old Pali Place in Honolulu, Hawaiʻi was built in 1904 for the Henriques couple, who had married in 1898.

Edgar Henriques was a businessman who had arrived in Hawaiʻi from New York City in 1896. Lucy was of high-born Hawaiian aliʻi heritage, descended from Isaac Davis, a British seaman who served as advisor to Kamehameha I in dealing with foreigners and in conquering the other islands. Lucy's aunt, Lucy Kaopaulu Peabody, built the house for the couple and also lived there herself until her death in 1928. It stands as one of the best-preserved and few surviving examples of a grand "kamaaina" dwelling from the end of the 19th century, with a covered porte-cochere and wraparound lānai; a splendid, wide-open interior; and large doors and windows that could easily be opened to tropical breezes. Its architect was Thomas Gill, father of Thomas P. Gill, and it was listed on the Hawaiʻi and National Register of Historic Places in 1984.

Lucy Kalanikumaikiekie Henriques was active in the Daughters of Hawaii, the Hawaiian Historical Society (HHS), and the Kaahumanu Society. Her husband Edgar was a prominent member of the business community and also active in the HHS, publishing occasional studies on traditional Hawaiian history and culture. Edgar and Lucy had a large collection of Hawaiian cultural artifacts, which are now in the Bernice P. Bishop Museum.

In 1932, Lucy Henriques willed land and a trust fund to establish a medical facility at Mahahikilua in Kamuela, Hawaii. After many delays, the Lucy Henriques Medical Center finally opened in 1977, eventually merging with North Hawaii Community Hospital in 1999.
