= Peke =

Peke may refer to:

- Peke, or Pekingese, a breed of dog originating in China
- Elizabeth Peke Davis (1803-1860), a Hawaiian high chiefess and daughter of Isaac Davis Aikake
- Hurricane Peke, a September 1987 hurricane
- Fifi the Peke, a fictional character created by The Walt Disney Company
- Ainize Barea (born 1992), Spanish footballer known as Peke
- Peke (To Love Ru), a fictional character in the manga series To Love Ru
