= Russian Fort Elizabeth =

Historic place in Kauaʻi County, Hawaiʻi

- Pāʻulaʻula State Historical Park
- U.S. National Register of Historic Places
- U.S. National Historic Landmark
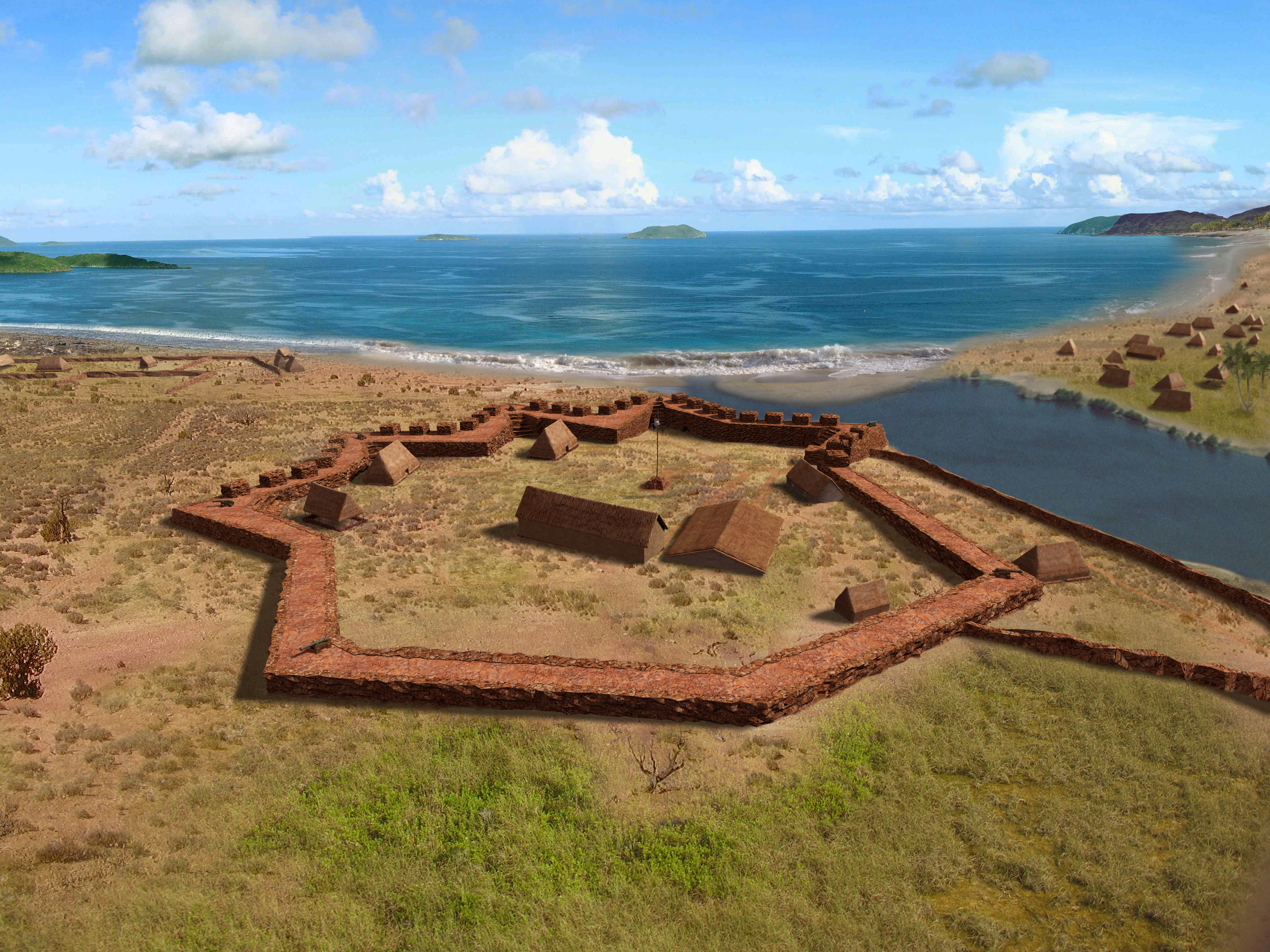
- Artist's impression of Pāʻulaʻula o Hipo

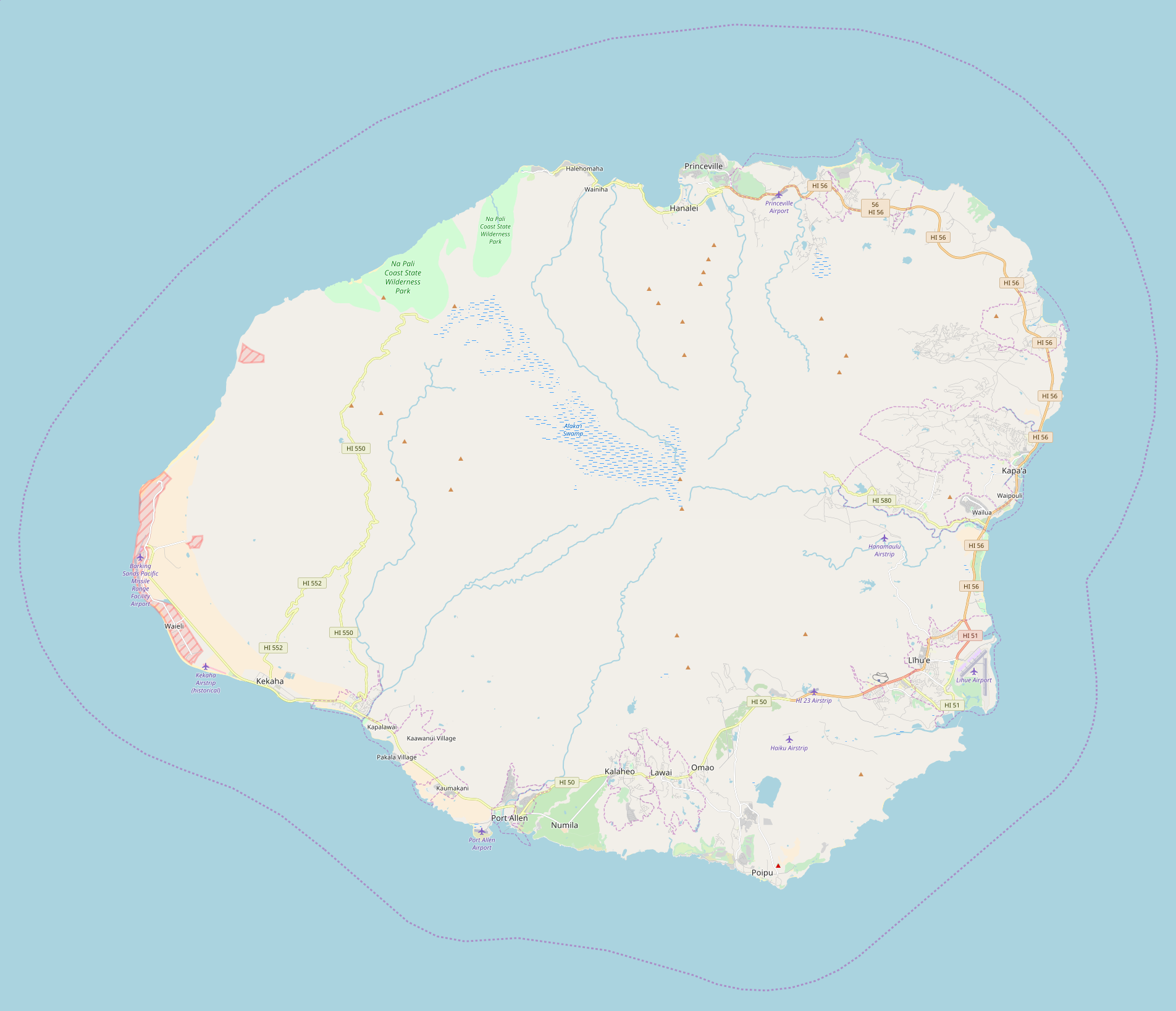
- Location within Kauai Location within Hawaii
- Nearest city: Waimea, Kauaʻi County Hawaiʻi
- Coordinates: 21°57′6″N 159°39′51″W
- Area: 17.5 acres (7.1 ha)
- Built: 1817
- Architect: Dr. Georg Anton Schäffer
- NRHP reference No.: 66000299

Significant dates
- Added to NRHP: October 15, 1966
- Designated NHL: December 29, 1962

Pāʻulaʻula State Historical Park is a National Historic Landmark just southeast of present-day Waimea on the island of Kauaʻi in Hawaiʻi. It is the last remaining Native Hawaiian fort on the Hawaiian Islands, built in the early 19th century by natives with an Italian-based design provided by a German traveler who arrived on a Russian-American Company ship, as a project of High Chief Kaumualiʻi. The star fort was employed by the Kingdom of Hawaii in the 19th century under the name Fort Hipo (Hawaiian: Pāʻulaʻula o Hipo).

== History ==
In 1815, German physician Georg Anton Schäffer, an agent of the Russian-American Company, arrived in Hawaiʻi to retrieve goods seized by Kaumualiʻi, chief of Kauaʻi island. According to the company instructions, Schäffer had to begin by establishing friendly relations with Kamehameha I, who had created a kingdom incorporating all the islands of Hawaiʻi and faced opposition from rebellious Kaumualiʻi. Then, with or without Kamehameha's support, Schäffer was directed to recover the cost of lost merchandise from Kaumualiʻi.

Schäffer's medical expertise gained Kamehameha's respect but he denied the Russians any assistance against Kaumualiʻi. Schäffer was followed by two company ships, the Otkrytie and the Il’mena. He then sailed to Kauaʻi on his own. To his surprise, Kaumualiʻi eagerly signed a "treaty" granting Russian Tsar Alexander I of Russia a protectorate over Kauaʻi. Kaumualiʻi convinced Schäffer that the Russians could just as easily capture the whole archipelago. Schäffer promised that Tsar Alexander would help him break free of Kamehameha's rule. Officially, Kaumualiʻi had pledged allegiance to Kamehameha in 1810. Kaumualiʻi probably never intended to give up power over the island; he thought he might reclaim his kingdom with Russia's help. Kaumualiʻi allowed Schäffer to build a fort near Waimea, named Fort or Fortress Elizabeth (Russian: Елизаветинская крепость, Elizavetinskaya Krepost) in honor of the Empress of Russia at the time, Louise of Baden. Two others—Fortress Alexander (крепость Александра, Krepost Aleksandra) and Fort Barclay-de-Tolly (форт Барклая-де-Толли, Fort Barklaya-de-Tolli)—were named for the reigning emperor Alexander and his marshal Michael Andreas Barclay de Tolly and constructed near Hanalei on Kauaʻi. Fort Elizabeth was constructed in 1817 on the east bank of the Waimea River overlooking Waimea Bay. It was built in the shape of an irregular octagon, about 300 to 450 feet (90 to 140 meters) across, with walls 20 ft (6 m) high. It housed a small Russian Orthodox chapel, Hawaiʻi's first Orthodox Christian church. Fort Alexander, on Hanalei Bay, also housed a small Orthodox chapel. When it was discovered that Schäffer did not have the Tsar's backing, he was forced to leave Kauaʻi in the fall of 1817. Captain Alexander Adams replaced the Russian flag with the new Kingdom of Hawaiʻi flag sometime before October 1817. Fort Elizabeth eventually came under the control of Kamehameha's supporters.

In 1820, the guns fired in salute as Kaumualiʻi's son, Prince George "Prince" Kaumualiʻi (also known as Humehume) arrived on the ship Thaddeus, after guiding American missionaries back to his home. Humehume tried to stage a rebellion in 1824 by attacking the fort. It was used as a base to capture him and keep the kingdom unified. It was abandoned in 1853.

== Dismantling ==
Schäffer was also involved in a secret mission to Hawaiʻi in 1816, where he tried to persuade Kamehameha I to accept Russian protection and establish a naval base on Kauaʻi. His plan was foiled by British and American diplomats, who convinced the king to reject the offer. Prince Alexander Bagration returned to Russia in 1817 and continued his military career until his retirement in 1821. The Kingdom of Hawaiʻi tasked Kauaʻi pioneer Valdemar Knudsen with the removal of armaments from the fort. Similar work was being done in that era across the kingdom, with other forts dismantled at Kailua-Kona, Lāhainā, and along the waterfront at the old port of Honolulu. In a letter sent to Honolulu, Knudsen listed an inventory of the guns at the fort following a survey made in 1862. They included 60 flintlock muskets, 16 swords, 12 18 lb (8.2 kg) cannons, 26 4 lb (1.8 kg)- and 6 lb (2.7 kg) cannons, six heavy guns, and 24 little guns. During the decommissioning of the fort in 1864, while Knudsen was loading armaments and munitions for sale as scrap metal onto a schooner in Waimea Bay, one or two cannons fell into Waimea Bay.

== Access ==
The fort is located at coordinates 21°57′6″N 159°39′51″W, on the southeastern shore of the mouth of the Waimea River in Waimea, Kauaʻi County, Hawaiʻi. A small parking lot is south of the Hawaiʻi Route 50 bridge, known as Kaumualiʻi Highway in honor of the last king. Facilities at the park include an interpretive walking path and restrooms. A brochure with details of the site is available for a self-guided interpretive tour. Visitors can explore the fort's remains, view scenery, take photos, and learn history.

== Significance ==
This large stone construction is the most magnificent reminder of the Russians' attempts to gain an influential position in the Hawaiian Islands during the early 19th century. Alexander Baranov, governor of the Russian-American Company at Sitka, wished to open trade with the Hawaiian Islands to obtain food for the Alaska settlements and sent several vessels for this purpose. One of these ships was wrecked at Waimea, Kauaʻi, in 1815; the next year, Baranov sent Georg Anton Schäffer to recover the cargo and, likely, to open a permanent Russian trading post or gain a political foothold. Schäffer quickly gained influence over King Kaumualiʻi of Kauaʻi, and in the summer of 1816 persuaded him to sign an agreement giving the Russians special trading and economic privileges on Kauaʻi and Oʻahu. In a failed attempt to build a fort at Honolulu, Schäffer went back to Kauaʻi to consolidate his position with Kaumualiʻi. His aim was evidently to convince the king to declare his independence of Kamehameha and enter under Russian protection. He erected an earthwork at Hanalei and, sometime between April and October 1817, built a strong stone fort at Waimea, over which the Russian flag was flown.

The Waimea establishment was a huge one. The fort was equipped with guns and quarters for troops. Schäffer owned a factory or trading house, with gardens and houses for a staff of about 30 families. Apparently the fort was not completed by the fall of 1817. By that time Schäffer's peremptory conduct had alienated the Hawaiians. Acting on Kamehameha's orders, Kaumualiʻi ousted the Russians.

After Schäffer left the islands, Hawaiian troops occupied the fort in October 1817. In 1820, a 21-gun salute was fired when the brig Thaddeus came up with the son of Kaumualiʻi, who had been attending school in the United States. The first mission settlement of Protestants on Kauaʻi took place on the riverbank by the fort. Around 1853, the fort was abandoned because the Hawaiian garrison was withdrawn.

== Physical structure ==
Varying in cross measurement from 300 to 450 feet (90 to 140 meters), the structure is in the form of 'an irregular octagon'. The outer walls are made of piled stone; the walls are from 25 to 45 feet (10 to 10 meters) thick and about 20 feet (10 meters) high, and remain in good condition. The foundations of the magazine, barracks, and other buildings are visible inside the walls. The area within and bordering the fort has been extensively cleared for park development. The region between the fort and the park was cleared for the park, which probably damaged any historical ruins and archaeological resources.

== See also ==
- Russian colonization of the Americas
- Orthodox Church in Hawaii
- Fort Alexander
- Fortress of St. Elizabeth
- Timofei Nikitich Tarakanov
