= Watson-Guptill =

American publisher

- Parent company: Ten Speed Press (Crown Publishing Group) (Penguin Random House)
- Founded: 1937
- Founder: Ernest Watson and Arthur L. Guptill
- Country of origin: United States
- Headquarters location: 1745 Broadway, New York City (Random House Tower)
- Publication types: Books
- Imprints: Amphoto Books; Back Stage Books; Billboard Books
- Official website: www.crownpublishing.com/archives/imprint/watson-guptill

Watson-Guptill is an American publisher of instructional books in the arts.

== History ==
The company was founded in 1937 by Ernest William Watson, Ralph Reinhold, and Arthur L. Guptill. They also published the magazine American Artist. Their headquarters are at 1745 Broadway, New York City, Random House Tower.

Billboard Publications acquired Watson-Guptill in 1962. The Dutch publisher VNU (later renamed the Nielsen Company) acquired Billboard in 1993. Random House acquired Watson-Guptill from Nielsen in 2008. Five years later, Random House, which was owned by Bertelsmann and the Penguin Group, owned by Pearson PLC, merged to form the Penguin Random House company. Watson-Guptill became an imprint of Ten Speed Press in 2013.

== Imprints ==
- Amphoto Books
