= Ault =

Ault may refer to:

== People ==
- Chris Ault (born 1946), American head coach for the Nevada Wolf Pack football team
- Dick Ault (1925–2007), American athlete
- Doug Ault (1950–2004), Major League Baseball player
- Frank Ault (1922–2006), U.S. Navy officer
- George Ault (1891–1948), American painter
- Harry Ault (1883–1941), American labor union newspaper editor
- Howard Ault (born 1966), American child murderer
- James Percy Ault (1881–1929), American geophysicist, oceanographer, and captain of a research vessel
- John Ault, English writer, academic, and politician
- Julie Ault (born 1957), American artist and curator
- Levi Addison Ault (1851–1930), businessman and bureaucrat
- Marie Ault (1870–1951), British actress
- Robert Ault, American art therapist
- Samuel Ault (c. 1814–1895), Ontario political figure
- William Ault (1842–1929), English potter
- William B. Ault (1898–1942), American naval aviation officer

== Places ==
- Ault, Colorado
- Ault, Northern Ireland, a townland
- Ault Hucknall, a small village in Derbyshire, England
- Ault Park (Ontario), Ontario, Canada
- Ault Park, Cincinnati, Ohio, US
- Ault, Somme, France
- Ault Township, St. Louis County, Minnesota

== Other ==
- USS Ault (DD-698)
- "Ault Pottery" and "Ault Faience", see William Ault

== See also ==
- Auld (disambiguation)
