= Lucy Kaopaulu Peabody =

Hawaiian chiefess and lady-in-waiting (1840–1928)

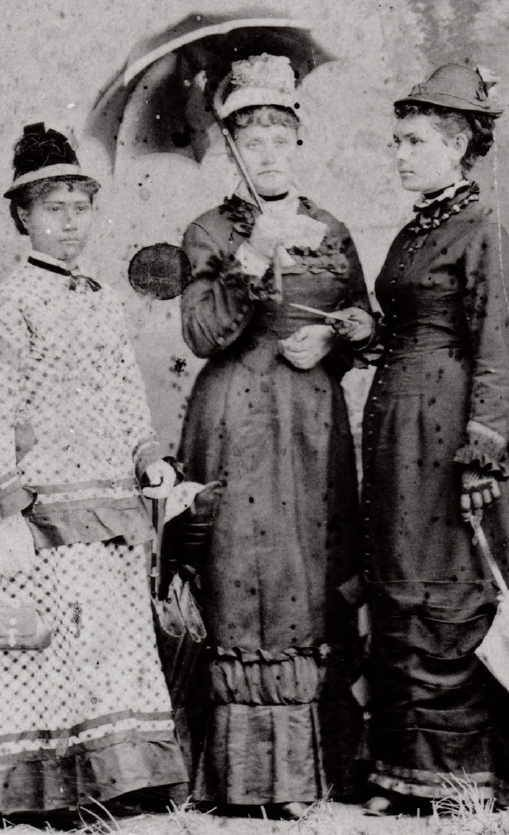
Lucy Peabody (center) with Grace Kamaikui Kahoalii, a relative of Queen Emma, and Lizzie Kia Nahaolelua

Lucy Kaopaulu Peabody (Note: Her name was most commonly abbreviated as Lucy K. Peabody or Lucy Kaopaulu Peabody (the version used here) in the Bishop Museum collection name and the inscription on the Davis family memorial in Oahu Cemetery; alternatives of her full name include Lucy Kaheiheimālie Kaopaulu K. Peabody, Lucy Kaopaulu Kalanikiʻekiʻe Peabody or Lucy Kaopauli Kalanikiʻekiʻe Peabody. Her name is often transliterated as "Luke Pibode" in the Hawaiian language.) (January 1, 1840 – August 9, 1928) was a high chiefess and courtier of the Kingdom of Hawaii. She served as a maid of honour and lady-in-waiting to Queen Emma of Hawaii. In 1905, she founded the reestablished Kaʻahumanu Society, a female-led civic society initially chartered during the Hawaiian monarchy.

== Early life and family ==
Peabody was born on January 1, 1840, at Luaʻehu, Lahaina, on the island of Maui, the daughter of Dr. Parker Peabody (1805–1849) and Elizabeth Kamakaila Davis. During her early childhood. she resided with her maternal grandparents at Waimea and Kawaihae, on the island of Hawaii. She was of mixed Native Hawaiian, American, and Welsh descent, known as hapa-haole in Hawaiian.

Her father was an American physician from New York who established a short-lived partnership with English physician Thomas Charles Byde Rooke, the uncle and hānai (adoptive) father of the future Queen Emma of Hawaii. Emma and Lucy were both also descended from the Hawaiian unions of King Kamehameha I's foreign advisors. Lucy's mother was the daughter of Kahaʻanapilo Papa, a scion of the Waimea line of chiefs, and George Hūʻeu Davis, the part-Hawaiian son of Isaac Davis, a Welsh sailor from Milford Haven, who alongside Englishman John Young (Emma's grandfather) served as military advisor to King Kamehameha I during his conquest of the Hawaiian Islands.

Her niece and namesake was Lucy Kalanikumaikiekie Davis Henriques (1878–1932), better known as Kalani Henriques, (Note: Also spelled Kalaniikumaiiluna. (Restarick 1924, pp. 241–242)) who married Edgar Henriques, an American politician and businessman during the Territory of Hawaii. The exact genealogy of Kalani Henriques is not specified. One source described the younger Lucy as the granddaughter of her mother's brother George Davis. The younger Lucy lived in Kona, before going to Honolulu to be raised by her aunt and learn English.

== Service to the Hawaiian court ==
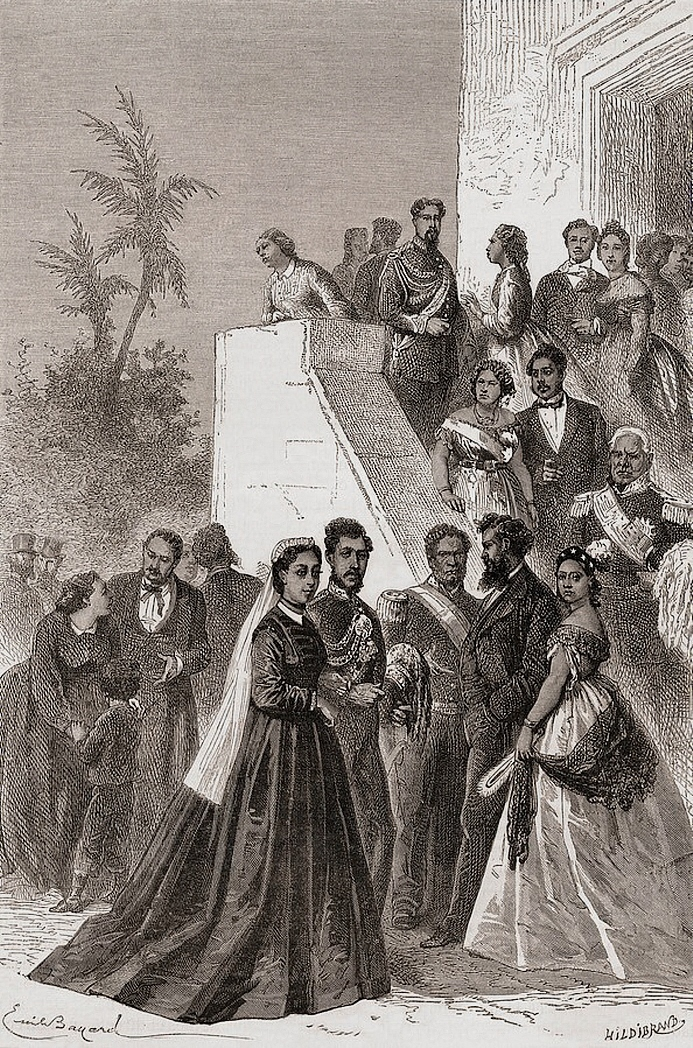
The Royal Family of Hawaii, c. 1863–6. Her patron Queen Dowager Emma is standing the center.

She developed a close friendship with Queen Emma, the wife of King Kamehameha IV who ruled from 1855 to 1863. During Emma's lifetime, Peabody served as the Queen's maid-of-honor and lady-in-waiting, serving the traditional role of kahu (caretaker) and as a member of her royal retinue. She was present at the sickbed of King Lunalilo in Kailua-Kona, and after his death in 1874, she supported Emma's unsuccessful candidacy against Kalākaua in the monarchial election which followed. Many of the letters written between Peabody and Emma were later used by historians and biographers of the Queen's life. After Queen Emma's death, she named Peabody as one of the devisees in her will and provided her with an annuity of 900 dollars.

Even after her royal patron's death in 1885, and the overthrow of the Kingdom of Hawaii in 1893, Peabody continued to represent Queen Emma's side of the royal family including being present at the start of repairs to the Royal Mausoleum of Hawaii in 1903. Along with her niece Maria Beckley Kahea, and Stella Keomailani Cockett, she represented the Young family and adherents of the Kamehameha royal line at the consecration of the Wylie tomb where many of Queen Emma's extended relations were interred.

During the 1890s, she became a member of Hui Aloha ʻĀina o Na Wahine (Hawaiian Women's Patriotic League), a patriotic group founded shortly after the overthrow of the monarchy to oppose annexation and support the deposed queen Liliuokalani. This organization helped collected the Kūʻē Petitions, which consisted of over 21,000 signatures opposing the annexation treaty of 1897. After the failure of the treaty, Hawaii was instead annexed by a joint resolution called the Newlands Resolution. She served as treasurer of the Delegates’ Funds for the organization.

Peabody worshipped at St. Andrew's Cathedral, as did her niece, Lucy Kalani Henriques. In later life, she devoted her time and resources to raising Native Hawaiian and part-Hawaiian young ladies of the former aristocracy in the manners of the old Hawaiian court. These protégés included her niece Lucy Henriques, Emma Weed Holt and Olga Keahikuni Kekauʻōnohi. She owned property around the Nu‘uanu Stream facing Vineyard Street in Honolulu from which she derived income.

== Legacy ==
In 1905, Lucy Peabody re-established the Kaʻahumanu Society (ʻAhahui Kaʻahumanu), becoming its second founder. This was a female-led civic society founded during the monarchy in 1864 by Princess Victoria Kamāmalu, Bernice Pauahi Bishop, and the future Queen Liliuokalani. The organization was disbanded shortly after the princess' death in 1866. On June 14, 1905, Peabody and a group of eleven women re-chartered the organization at Kawaiahaʻo Church; she was elected president. The organization chose not to invite the deposed queen, Liliuokalani, even though she had been an original member of the 1864 club. Historian Helena Allen reasoned that this was the result of the contentious genealogy trials of 1883. These had soured the relationship between the House of Kalākaua and factions loyal to Queen Emma, of which Lucy still considered herself a part.

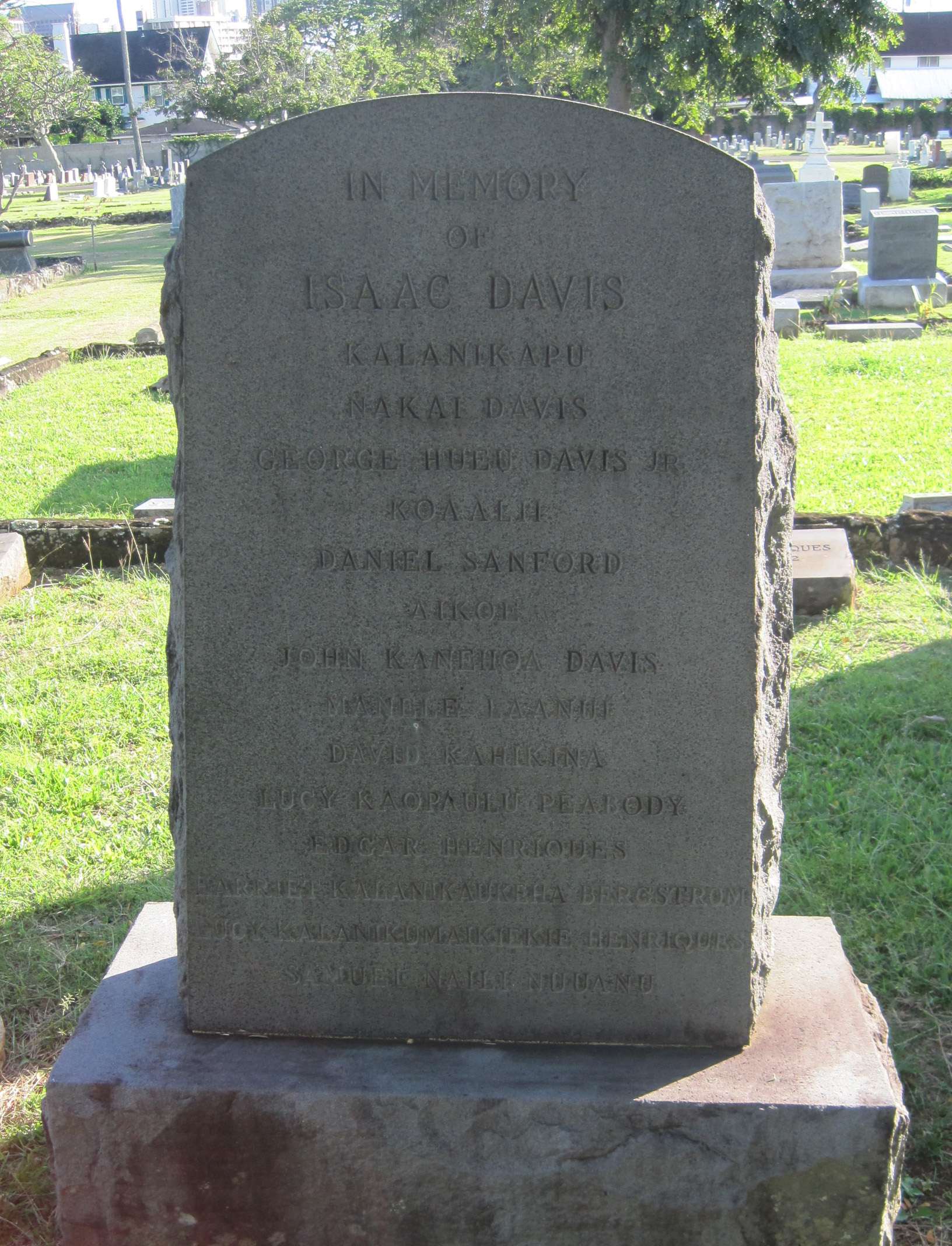
Memorial to Isaac Davis and his descendants, Oahu Cemetery

In later life, Peabody served as a wealth of knowledge to historians during the Territorial period. Ethel Moseley Damon, author of Koamalu: A Story of Pioneers on Kauai, noted that she was "a Hawaiian of rank revered by us all, and one deeply learned in the lore of her native country". She inherited many artifacts from her Welsh great-grandfather including his Anglican prayer book and a letter from Captain George Vancouver. Her niece, Lucy Henriques, inherited Peabody's private collections including her letters and personal writings, along with those of Parker Peabody, Isaac Davis, John Young, Dr. Rooke, and Queen Emma. The Bernice Pauahi Bishop Museum in Honolulu later acquired the material, which is known today as the Lucy Kaopaulu Peabody, Edgar and Kalani Henriques Collection. It also consisted of 1,300 ethnological specimens, many of which Edgar Henriques cataloged. These included geological specimens, samples of Hawaiian wood and many artifacts of historical importance including swords, pictures and medals.

In her final years, she moved in with her niece Lucy Henriques and her husband Edgar Henriques, possibly at the Edgar and Lucy Henriques House. Lucy Peabody never married or had children of her own. She died on August 9, 1928, at the age of 89, at her niece's residence. She was buried at the Oahu Cemetery in the Davis family plot under a marker with the inscription "Lucy K. Peabody". A separate memorial for Isaac Davis and his descendants lists her as "Lucy Kaopaulu Peabody". In her will she left twelve acres of land in Makahikilu, Waimea to her niece to establish a medical facility in the North Hawaii area, where both women had lived and grown up. After Henriques' death in 1932, the Lucy Kalanikumaikiʻekiʻe Henriques Charitable Trust was established to fulfill the legacy of the two women. The Lucy Henriques Medical Center finally opened in 1977, eventually merging with North Hawaii Community Hospital in 1999.

== Bibliography ==
- Allen, Helena G. (1982). The Betrayal of Liliuokalani: Last Queen of Hawaii, 1838–1917. Glendale, CA: A. H. Clark Company. ISBN 978-0-87062-144-4. OCLC 9576325.
- Damon, Ethel Moseley (1931). Koamalu: A Story of Pioneers on Kauai, and of what They Built in that Island Garden. Vol. 1. Honolulu: Honolulu Star-Bulletin Press. OCLC 653475.
- Day, Arthur Grove (1984). History Makers of Hawaii: a Biographical Dictionary. Honolulu: Mutual Publishing of Honolulu. ISBN 978-0-935180-09-1. OCLC 11087565.
- Emerson, Joseph S.; Beckwith, Martha Warren (1924). Hawaiian String Games. Poughkeepsie, NY: Vassar College. OCLC 4847641.
- Griffin, Pat L. (2012). "The Līhuʻe Place Name on Kauaʻi". The Hawaiian Journal of History. 46. Honolulu: Hawaiian Historical Society: 61–82. hdl:10524/33794. OCLC 60626541.
- Holt, John Dominis (1993). Recollections: Memoirs of John Dominis Holt, 1919–1935. Honolulu: Ku Paʻa. ISBN 9780681027831. OCLC 30886291.
- Kaeo, Peter; Queen Emma (1976). Korn, Alfons L. (ed.). News from Molokai, Letters Between Peter Kaeo & Queen Emma, 1873–1876. Honolulu: The University Press of Hawaii. hdl:10125/39980. ISBN 978-0-8248-0399-5. OCLC 2225064.
- Kanahele, George S. (1999). Emma: Hawaii's Remarkable Queen. Honolulu: University of Hawaii Press. ISBN 978-0-8248-2240-8. OCLC 40890919.
- McKinzie, Edith Kawelohea (1986). Stagner, Ishmael W. (ed.). Hawaiian Genealogies: Extracted from Hawaiian Language Newspapers. Vol. 2. Honolulu: University of Hawaii Press. ISBN 978-0-939154-37-1. OCLC 12555087.
- Peterson, Barbara Bennett (1984). "Victoria Kamamalu". Notable Women of Hawaii. Honolulu: University of Hawaii Press. pp. 192–194. ISBN 978-0-8248-0820-4. OCLC 11030010.
- Pratt, Elizabeth Kekaaniauokalani Kalaninuiohilaukapu (1920). History of Keoua Kalanikupuapa-i-nui: Father of Hawaii Kings, and His Descendants, with Notes on Kamehameha I, First King of All Hawaii. Honolulu: Honolulu Star-Bulletin. OCLC 154181545.
- Restarick, Henry Bond (1924). Hawaii, 1778–1920, from the Viewpoint of a Bishop: Being the Story of English and American Churchmen in Hawaii with Historical Sidelights. Honolulu: Paradise of the Pacific. OCLC 1337282.
- Restarick, Henry B. (1914). "John Young of Hawaii, an American". Twenty-Second Annual Report of the Hawaiian Historical Society for the Year 1913. Honolulu: Hawaiian Historical Society: 25–43.
- Rose, Roger G. (1992). Reconciling the Past: Two Basketry Kāʻai and the Legendary Līloa and Lonoikamakahiki. Honolulu: Bishop Museum Press. ISBN 9780930897765. OCLC 28374106.
- Rose, Roger G. (1978). Symbols of Sovereignty: Feather Girdles of Tahiti and Hawaiʻi. Honolulu: Department of Anthropology, Bernice P. Bishop Museum. OCLC 461816715.
- Siddall, John William, ed. (1921). Men of Hawaii. Vol. 2. Honolulu: Honolulu Star-Bulletin. OCLC 16326675.
- Stokes, John F. G. (1935). "Kaoleioku, Paternity and Biographical Sketch". Forty-Third Annual Report of the Hawaiian Historical Society for the Year 1934. Honolulu: Hawaiian Historical Society: 15–42. hdl:10524/94.
- Stokes, John F. G. (1939). "Nationality of John Young, A Chief of Hawaii". Forty-Seventh Annual Report of the Hawaiian Historical Society for the Year 1938. Honolulu: Hawaiian Historical Society: 13–38. hdl:10524/38.
- Van Dyke, Jon M. (2008). Who Owns the Crown Lands of Hawaiʻi?. Honolulu: University of Hawaii Press. ISBN 978-0-8248-6560-3. OCLC 257449971 – via Project MUSE.
- Winne, Jane Lathrop (1928). Kuakini and Hulihee: the Story of the Kailua Palace, Kona, Hawaii. Honolulu. OCLC 16333276.
