= James Auld =

James Auld may refer to:

- James Auld (politician) (1921–1982), Canadian politician
- James Muir Auld (1879–1942), Australian artist
- Jim Auld (1889–1974), New Zealand rugby league footballer

== See also ==
- Auld (surname)
