= Humehume =

Hawaiian son of the king of Kauaʻi and Niʻihau

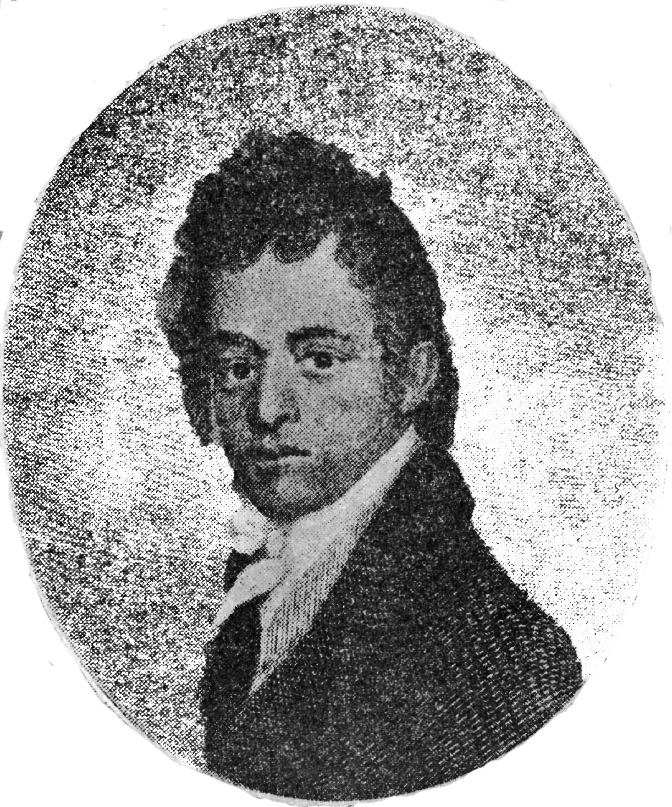
- Engraved Portrait by Samuel Morse, 1816
- Born: c. 1798; Kauaʻi
- Died: May 3, 1826; Honolulu
- Spouse: Elizabeth Peke Davis
- Issue: Harriet Kawahinekipi Kaumualiʻi, Kamakahai
Names
- George Prince Kaumualiʻi Humehume
- Father: King Kaumualiʻi of Kauaʻi
- Mother: unknown

Humehume (c. 1798–1826), known by many different names during his time, such as George Prince, George Prince Kaumualiʻi, Tamoree or Kumoree by American writers, was a son of the king of part of the Hawaiian Islands. He traveled widely, served in the U.S. military, and led a failed rebellion on the island of Kauaʻi.

== Early life ==
He was born in the late 1790s with the name Humehume. His father was King Kaumualiʻi, ruler of the islands of Kauaʻi and Niʻihau. His mother was a commoner, of whom not much is known. This might explain an important event that happened when he was a young boy.

In January 1804 the American trading ship Hazard arrived at Kauaʻi. Since the landing of Captain James Cook in January 1778, the port of Waimea had been a known stop for European and American ships in the Pacific. King Kaumualiʻi paid Captain James Rowan of the American trading ship Hazard to take his son aboard, ostensibly to get an education in America. A more believable theory is that Kaumualiʻi's Queen did not want any competition for the future throne with her own son who had the better royal pedigree. His father suggested the name "George" after the Prince of Wales at the time (later George IV of the United Kingdom).

== World traveler ==
The ship sailed to the Pacific Northwest, then across the Pacific to China, through the Indian Ocean, around Africa, and finally a year and a half later, back to New England. Hazard finally arrived at Providence, Rhode Island on June 30, 1805. King Kaumualiʻi had provided Rowan some compensation to support his son, probably in the form of valuable sandalwood, estimated to be worth seven to eight thousand dollars. George traveled with Captain Rowan to Boston and then to Worcester, Massachusetts, where he was put into the house of his teacher Samuel Cotting in 1813 when Rowan's property had run out. Rowan tried to get George an apprenticeship as a joiner, but George was now a restless young man.

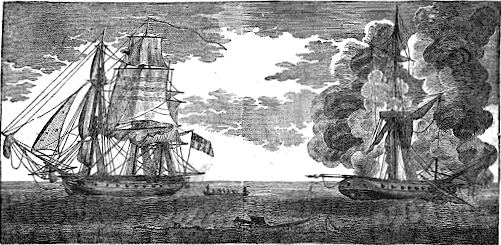
Humehume was injured in the 1814 battle between Wasp and Reindeer in the English Channel

He enlisted in the United States Marine Corps and was assigned to USS Wasp during the War of 1812. Wasp left port in May 1814, and over the next two months was involved in several naval battles in the English Channel. In a June 28 battle with HMS Reindeer he was injured, and came ashore in L'Orient, France. He returned and was given a medical discharge, but struggled to support himself. On June 21, 1815, he enlisted in the U.S. Navy, and sailed to the Mediterranean on USS Enterprise fighting in the Second Barbary War. His service records show the name "George Prince".

Another Hawaiian, who had also made his way to New England, went by the name Henry Obookiah (also known as Ōpūkahia). Henry heard about George's war record, and located him. Henry had embraced Christianity and convinced George and three other Hawaiians to help the missionaries. The missionaries thought recruiting the war hero would be good public relations, and might have enhanced his war record. By autumn 1816, George was living in the home of Reverend Jedidiah Morse, and was taken to the Yale commencement exercises of Yale where he met Yale's President Timothy Dwight. He had learned to read and write English, since several of his letters survive. In particular, he wrote one to his father on October 19, 1816, about his travels and his hope to return.

Near the end of 1816, a pamphlet titled "A Narrative of Five Youths from the Sandwich Islands" was published to raise funds for the mission board. It included portraits of each of the five students drawn by Samuel F. B. Morse, Jedidiah's son. The U.S. Navy at this point claimed that George had not been properly discharged, so proposed sending him to West Point Military Academy. The missionaries thought it would be helpful to them if he went, but George did not want to go to West Point. George's letter to his father was published, and when Samuel Cotting read it, he wanted to cash in on the celebrity by claiming he was owed money for the boy's care. George, basking in the attention, wrote a furious letter complaining about Cotting's treatment. Among the insults: "If I am worthy of the title of a Prince I am not going to be trodden under foot by such a dirty scoundrel as you are."

On May 1, 1817, the Foreign Mission School at Cornwall, Connecticut opened its first term with George and the other Hawaiians as students. By the next term there were twelve students including Indians from Bengal and Calcutta, and a native American Indian. Samuel Ruggles and James Ely were learning to be mission teachers under principal Edwin Welles Dwight. Henry Ōpūkahia died in February 1818 (with the others at his side) but the school expanded under Herman Daggett.

George was eager to return to his homeland, but as the promised voyage was delayed, he grew impatient and would sometimes cause trouble at the school. He thought the other students should defer to him, given his "royal" status, and in fact had to re-learn the Hawaiian language that he had not spoken since being a young child. On October 23, 1819, the four remaining Hawaiians finally sailed from Boston on the brig Thaddeus, along with the first company of American missionaries from the American Board of Commissioners for Foreign Missions. Although the other Hawaiians are recorded as being baptized and assistant missionaries, he was essentially a private passenger.

== Back in the islands ==
The ship arrived at Kailua-Kona on the island of Hawaii on April 4, 1820. He accompanied the singing of Christian hymns on the "bass-viol" for the first Sabbath. When the Thaddeus left for Honolulu, George stayed behind and after a quick courtship, married Elizabeth Peke Davis, known as "Betty Davis" (1802–1860), daughter of Isaac Davis who had served Kamehameha I as a military advisor and married into Hawaiian royalty. After getting passage on another boat to Honolulu, he convinced missionaries Ruggles and Whitney to take him to Kauaʻi on the Thaddeus. George was eager to reunite with his father, and the missionaries were interested in making an outpost on Kauaʻi.

The guns of former Russian Fort Elizabeth were fired in a salute as he sailed into the bay of Waimea on Kauaʻi on May 3, 1820. He stayed below deck until he knew they were not being fired as a warning. His father happily welcomed his son, who explained the missionaries were his friends. Captain Blanchard was thanked with gifts of provisions and a load of sandalwood. On July 24, 1820, a small party of missionaries started a school in Waimea.

The joy of the reunion was not to last. The land of his birth had changed while he had been away; he found he no longer fit into either culture. Although he had been calling himself "Prince", the kingdom of Kauaʻi had become a vassal state to Kamehameha I since 1810, so he was not to inherit any real power. In 1821 King Kamehameha II paid a surprise visit to his father, and forced the elder Kaumualiʻi into exile on Honolulu. By this time, George Prince had reverted to using his birth name "Humehume", living with a few followers in a small town called Wahiawa east of the Hanapepe valley. Humehume means "to tie up", as in wearing the traditional Hawaiian malo, or getting ready for battle. He and his wife Peke had a son who died young (1821-1823), and a daughter in November, 1821 named Kamakahai. Kamakahai was given to another Chiefess on the Island. They had a 3rd child, Harriet Kaumualiʻi (1821–1843) Her Hawaiian name was Ka wahine kipi which means "the rebel woman", was given to her by Kaahumanuu. His father-in-law Isaac Davis had died drinking poison that was probably intended for his father Kaumualiʻi, so he became afraid that an attempt would be made on his own life. In May 1824 his father died, and soon he made his move.

On August 8, 1824, he led his followers in a surprise attack on Fort Elizabeth, now manned by troops of the Kingdom of Hawaii. After entering the fort, his victory shouts did not bring throngs of supporters, but rather roused the defenders. The attack was repelled. Missionary leader Hiram Bingham I and his family were visiting at the time, but escaped injury. Humehume and his troops returned to Wahiawa and tried to gather more followers.

Kalanimoku, an experienced military commander from earlier campaigns of Kamehameha I, had just been stationed on Kauaʻi, and sent for reinforcements to search for Humehume. On August 18, 1824 Hoapili, Kahekili, Laʻanui and Kaikioewa arrived with an estimated one thousand troops and joined Kalanimoku, marching to meet the rebels at their camp, who were routed. It was estimated 130 Kauaians died while only 1 Hawaiian fell. This would be the largest loss of life in a military armed conflict in the Hawaiian islands until the attack on Pearl Harbor over a century later. Humehume, Betty and the baby fled on horseback into the rugged mountains above the Hanapepe valley. Betty and the child were quickly captured and not harmed.

Humehume was pursued for several weeks before he was captured and brought before Kalanimoku, who spared his life. He was taken to exile in Honolulu (as his father had been), where he was reunited with his wife and child, but died from influenza less than a year later on May 3, 1826. He was buried in a common unmarked grave, and there is no known memorial to him.

== See also ==
- Aliʻi Aimoku of Kauaʻi
- List of Missionaries to Hawaii
