= Thomas Gill (architect) =

American architect

- Born: 1870; Brooklyn, New York, U.S.
- Died: 1941 (aged 70–71); Honolulu, Territory of Hawaii
- Education: Brooklyn Polytechnic; Pratt Institute
- Children: Thomas Gill (son)

Thomas Gill (1870–1941) was an American architect who worked in Honolulu, Hawaii, from 1899 to 1941.

== Early life and education ==
Born in Brooklyn, New York, he studied at Brooklyn Polytechnic and Pratt Institute.

== Career ==
Gill began his career in 1892 with Walbridge & Walbridge of Brooklyn, and later worked in Bellingham, Washington, before embarking on a world tour that landed him in Honolulu on December 9, 1898. There he found work with H. L. Kerr before opening up his own office in 1903. He was a founding member of the Oahu Country Club and designed its clubhouse, but otherwise designed mostly private residences, two of which are on the National Register of Historic Places: the Edgar and Lucy Henriques House (1904) and the Thomas Alexander Burningham House (1910).

== Personal life ==
His son, Thomas Gill, became a prominent local politician.
