= Thomas Alexander Burningham House =

Historic house in Hawaii, United States

- U.S. National Register of Historic Places
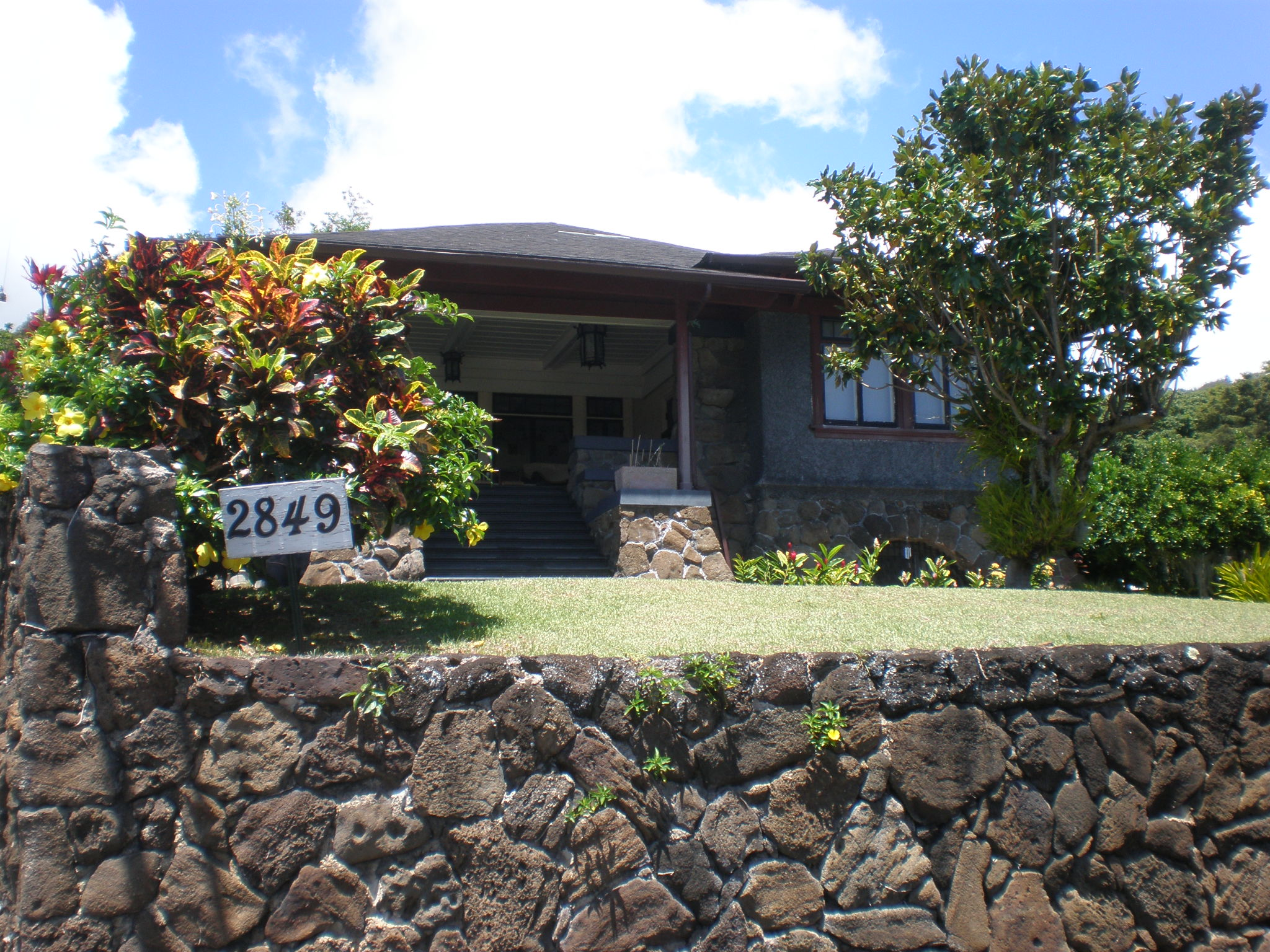
- Front entrance

- Location within Honolulu Location within Oahu Location within Hawaii
- Location: 2849 Pali Hwy., Honolulu, Hawaii
- Coordinates: 21°20′18″N 157°50′34″W
- Area: less than one acre
- Built: 1910
- Architect: Thomas Gill
- Architectural style: American Craftsman bungalow
- NRHP reference No.: 93001029
- Added to NRHP: October 13, 1993

The Thomas Alexander Burningham House at 2849 Pali Highway in Honolulu, Hawaiʻi, built in 1910, is a good example of the earliest American Craftsman bungalow homes in the city. Its flaired hip roof and stone-and-stucco siding differentiate it from the many gabled, and often half-timbered, bungalows built during the 1920s. The architect was Thomas Gill (the father of Thomas P. Gill), who designed the Oahu Country Club building and many residences in Honolulu between 1899 and 1941. The house was listed in the National Register of Historic Places in 1993.

Thomas Alexander Burningham was an employee of a number of prominent local businesses: Von Hamm-Young, Castle & Cooke, Honolulu Iron Works, and Inter-Island Steam Navigation Company. Upon his death, the property passed to his nephew, George L. Burningham, who also worked at Inter-Island Steam Navigation Company.

The one-story, rectangular house is more substantial than many a bungalow, with a large living room with Chinese-style lights, three bedrooms separated by both screen and solid doors, and a hall leading to the kitchen and pantry. It also has a central vacuum system and a basement. The fine craftsmanship can be seen in its parquet floors, built-in furniture, and stained-glass windows. The lava rock used for the foundation, support piers, and texture in the stucco also show commitment to the use of local materials. However, the leaded glass for the windows and the glazed brick for the fireplace both came from Australia, and the beveled glass in the bifold doors to the lānais came from France.
