= Ernest William Watson =

American painter, illustrator, and writer (1884–1969)

Ernest William Watson (January 14, 1884, Conway, Massachusetts – January 23, 1969, New Rochelle, New York) was an American painter, illustrator and writer.

== Biography ==
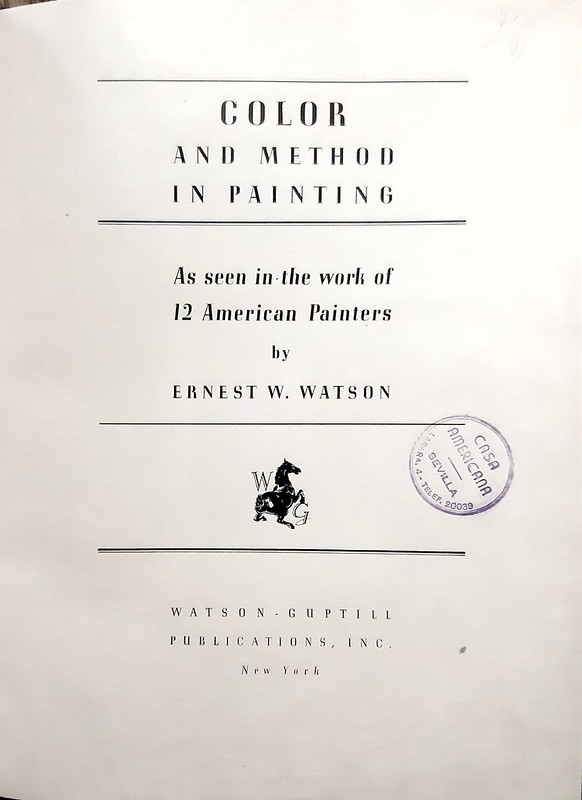
Title page, Color and Method in Painting as Seen in the Work of 12 American Painters.

He graduated from the Massachusetts Normal Art School in Boston in 1906, and received his teacher-education degree the following year from the Pratt Institute in Brooklyn, New York, where he later taught, in 1907.

In 1911, he married one of his students, Eva Auld. They had two sons, Lyn (Merlin) Auld Watson and painter Aldren Auld Watson (1917–2013). Watson married for a second time in New York City, in April 1949, to Eve Brian.

In 1915, Watson co-founded the Berkshire Summer School of Art in Monterey, Massachusetts, where he remained active in teaching summer sessions until 1927. He was a member of the Prairie Print Makers, the Rochester Print Club, the National Sculpture Society, the Society of Illustrators, and the Salmagundi Club. He was also editor of American Artist and Scholastic Magazine.

Watson was awarded a Gari Melchers Memorial Medal from the Artist's Fellowship in 1960.

His work is in the collections of the Museum of Fine Arts, Boston, the Brooklyn Museum, the Minneapolis Institute of Art, La Salle University Art Museum, the Memorial Art Gallery at the University of Rochester, the Art Gallery of New South Wales, the Library of Congress, the National Gallery of Art, the Smithsonian American Art Museum and the Wichita Art Museum.

== Publications ==
- Art of Pencil Drawing
- Composition in Landscape and Still Life
- Creative Perspective for Artists and Illustrators
- Linoleum Block Printing
- Color and Method in Painting
- Ernest W. Watson's Sketch Diary
- The Watson Drawing Book

== See also ==
- Watson-Guptill publishers
