= Alexander Adams (sailor) =

British sailor (1780–1871)

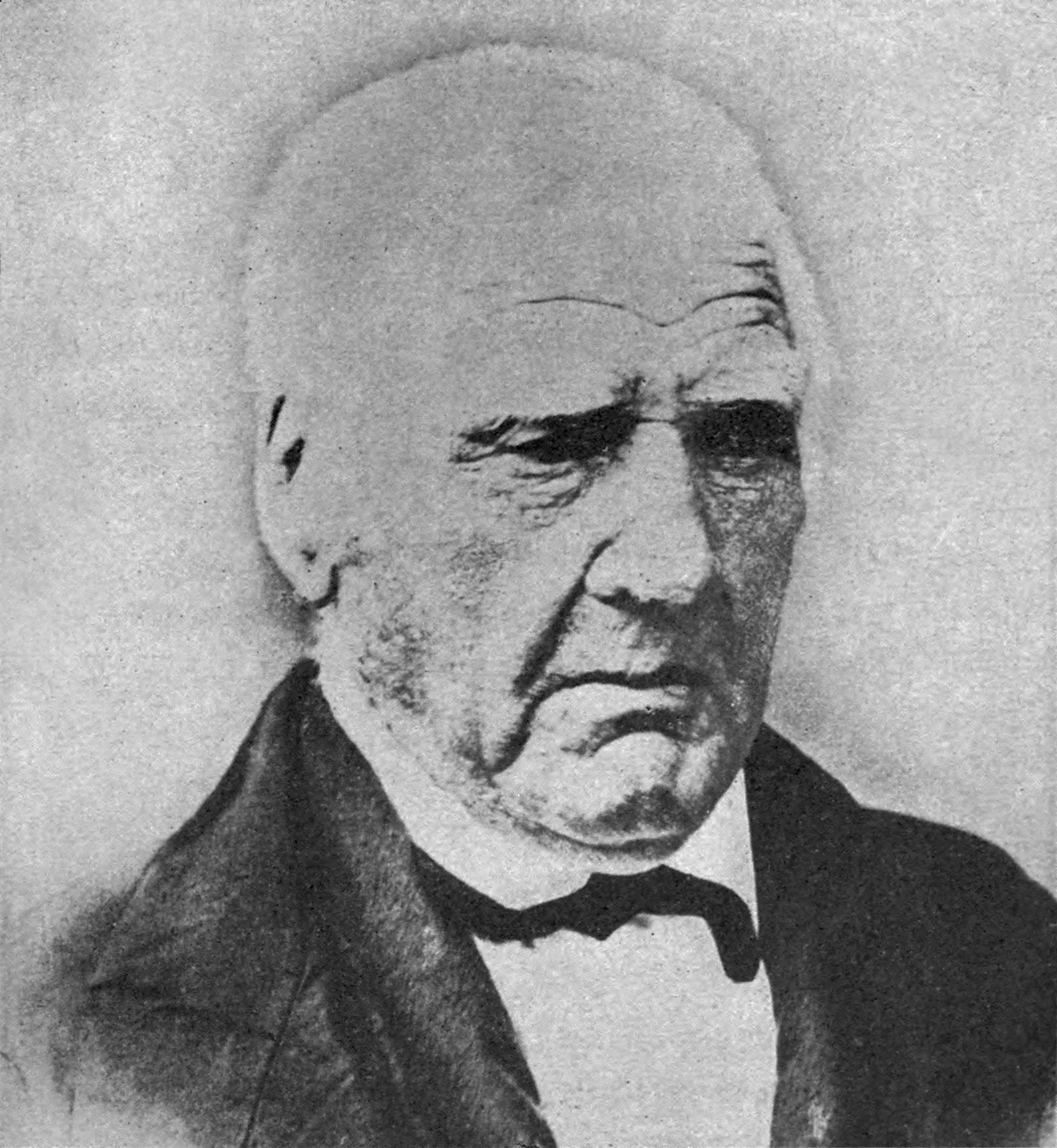
- Born: December 27, 1780; Arbroath, Angus, Scotland
- Died: October 17, 1871 (aged 90); Oahu, Hawaii
- Occupation: Sailor
- Known for: Flag of Hawaii
- Spouses: Sarah Kaniaulono Davis; Sarah Ulukaihonua Harbottle; Charlotte Oili Harbottle
- Parents: John Fyfe; Jean Adams

Captain Alexander Adams (1780–1871) was a Scotsman who served in the British Royal Navy and then came to the Hawaiian Islands and served in the navy of the Kingdom of Hawaii. Known to the Hawaiians as Alika Napunako Adams.

== Britain ==
Adams was born December 27, 1780, in Arbroath, Angus, Scotland. He said his father was John Fyfe, who he said was the "Earl of Fyfe", born in Arbroath c. 1754. His mother was Jean Adams, born in Arbroath c. 1758.

Leaving Scotland in 1792, he worked 4 years aboard Zephyr belonging to Husson & Co. out of Newcastle upon Tyne, England. In 1796, he left Zephyr, and joined Calcutta out of Lancaster for two trips. He was drafted into naval service aboard HMS Elizabeth after the Battle of Trafalgar in the Napoleonic Wars.

== Hawaii ==
He arrived in Hawaii sometime between 1809 and 1811 on the American trading ship Albatross from Boston. He met King Kamehameha I and joined English sailor John Young, who had arrived in 1790, to command the navy of the Kingdom of Hawaii. He was awarded control of over 2,000 acres (810 ha) in the Niu Valley, including control over the Kupapa Fishpond, which he later filled in for purposes of growing sweet potatoes. (east of Honolulu, coordinates 21°17′24″N 157°44′20″W).

In April 1816 at Kawaihae Bay, Adams negotiated to buy a ship called Forester under Captain John Ebbetts which had been owned by American John Jacob Astor. Prince Liholiho (soon to become King Kamehameha II) purchased the ship with sandalwood (Santalum ellipticum), and changed its name to Kaahumanu after his powerful stepmother Queen Kaʻahumanu. A condition of the deal was for Adams to take command of the ship. It was a small two-masted trading ship called a brig.

On March 7, 1817, the Kingdom of Hawaii sent Adams to China on his ship to sell sandalwood. To enter the harbor, the ship paid $3000 in port charges, making it not a financial success. Upon returning October 5, 1817, at Hilo and hearing of the amount Adams had to pay, King Kamehameha decided Hawaii should also generate revenue from port charges.

The Flag of Hawaii

He refused to sail under the American flag once the War of 1812 broke out. When Adams sailed the Kaahumanu to China, it was the first vessel under the flag of Hawaii. Some traditions also credit him with designing the flag, though this honor has also been claimed for King Kamehameha I himself or another British sailor of the time, George Charles Beckley. His reasoning for adding the British Union Jack into the flag was due to the power of the British Empire at the time. He quotes "if we don't pledge allegiance to Britain we may all perish".

He was sent to Kauaʻi by Kamehemeha I to remove Russian Fort Elizabeth that had been set up in 1817. His words were "upon arriving they were soon dispatched".

He stood on the shore with John Young when the first Christian missionaries anchored offshore in 1820. He helped convince the King to allow the missionaries to come ashore and speak to the King. He served as the Honolulu Harbor Pilot after Naihekukui left in 1823. When HMS Blonde arrived in 1825, Adams helped the Scottish naturalist distribute some plants he thought would be commercially successful in the tropical climate.

Queen Kaʻahuman gave Adams over 290 acres (120 ha) of land in Kalihi Valley (on the island of Oahu a few miles from Waikiki) in gratitude for his services. The area was called Apili.

After 30 years of piloting, Adams retired in 1853, grew fruit on his land in Kalihi Valley, and was great host to visitors. Adams kept a journal which his notes were taken from and printed in Honolulu Star Bulltein May 4, 1935. Adams lived the remainder of his life in the Hawaiian Islands, where he married three times and left many descendants. He was given the Hawaiian name Alika Napunako Adams. His first wife was Sarah Kaniaulono or Kale Davis, daughter of Isaac Davis. Two of his marriages were to Sarah Ulukaihonua Harbottle and then to her sister Charlotte Oili Harbottle (died 1893). Both were daughters of Papapaupu (or Papapaunauapu, the adopted granddaughter of King Kamehameha) and John Harbottle, another Scotsman serving as Honolulu pilot. By his account he had 15 children; 10 were still alive at the time of his death.

He had a home on what was named Adams Lane in 1850, in his honor, a small lane in downtown Honolulu next to the Hawaiian Telephone company building at coordinates 21°18′33″N 157°51′34″W, as well as in Kalihi Valley. Adams died October 17, 1871. He is buried next to his friend and fellow Scotsman Andrew Auld in the Nuʻuanu Cemetery. Their common tombstone contains the following inscription in the Scots dialect:

"Twa croanies frae the land of heather,
Are sleepin' here in death th'gether."

The estate in Niu Valley was held by his granddaughter Mary Lucas, who started subdividing in the 1950s. The area created by the filling of Kupapa Fishpond is now the site of numerous oceanfront homes. One grandson of Lucas was Air Force General Benjamin B. Cassiday Jr., Another grandson is Nainoa Thompson, who revived the ancient Hawaiian craft of instrumentless navigation and founded the Polynesian Voyaging Society, which sponsors voyages by traditional Hawaiian sailing wa'a (canoes) Hokulea and Hawai'i Loa. Another was Paul R. Cassiday, trustee of the Campbell Estate.

== See also ==
- History of Hawaii
