= Eastern Orthodoxy in Hawaii =

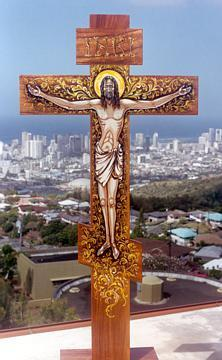
The Main Altar Cross of the Russian Orthodox Church of Hawaii in Honolulu

Eastern Orthodox Christianity in Hawaii began with early Russian missions of the 19th century and continues with multiple Eastern Orthodox churches in the Hawaiian Islands.

== History ==
The first Christian service of any type in Hawaii was a lay funeral service conducted by Captain James Cook for an English sailor at Kealakekua Bay on the Big Island of Hawaii on January 28, 1779.

The first Christian liturgical service held in Hawaiʻi was a Russian Orthodox celebration of Pascha (Πάσχα, meaning Easter in Greek). Sometime between 1750 and 1793, while traveling from the Far East to what was then Russian America, a Russian trading ship stopped over in the Hawaiian Islands. The Russian Orthodox priest, not wanting to celebrate Pascha at sea, instructed the captain to disembark. The captain told the priest he feared the "natives" but the priest responded, "They will not harm us, for we are Orthodox, and we bear the Light of Christ to illumine their hearts." They disembarked and blessed a temporary altar under a newly built temple made out of palms and bamboo and adorned with an Our Lady of the Sign icon of the Theotokos (Mother of God) and the Christ Child. It was rumored that as they departed the priest left the icon used in the Paschal Divine Liturgy. The ship's priest promised that, "We shall return and baptize these natives to the One, Holy, Catholic, and Apostolic Church."

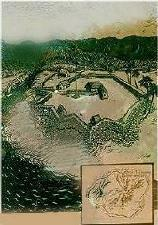
Russian Fort Elizabeth as it was in 1815 on the Island of Kauai

=== First chapels ===
In 1815, Russians built Hawaii's first Orthodox church: the Russian Orthodox chapel at Fort Elizabeth, coordinates 21°57′6″N 159°39′51″W. On the island of Kauaʻi, three Russian forts were built: Fort Alexander, Fort Barclay, and Fort Elizabeth. Fort Alexander also housed a small Orthodox chapel, but Fort Elizabeth was the trading base for the new Russian-American Company in Hawaii. When King Kaumualiʻi of Kauaʻi ceded his kingdom to King Kamehameha I in 1816 following the Tsar Alexander I's refusal to annex Kauaʻi due to political troubles in Russia, the forts were also ceded, and the Hawaiian Islands become one unified kingdom. The chapels ultimately fell into disrepair after Calvinist missionaries from the United States landed in 1820. In November 2017, Elizabeth Fort Forum 2017 was held in Kauai to celebrate the fort's bicentennial, that included a panikhida by the priests from the Holy Theotokos of Iveron Russian Orthodox Church of Oahu and St. Juvenaly Mission of the Big Island.

In 1882, the Kingdom of Hawaii sent a diplomatic delegation to St. Petersburg, Russia, to witness the coronation of Tsar Alexander III. The reports of Hawaii's special envoy to the Russian court, Colonel Curtis Piʻehu Iʻaukea, Secretary of Foreign Affairs for the Kingdom of Hawaiʻi, regarding the Russian Orthodox liturgical services were widely published in Hawaiian language newspapers. Two years later, Tsar Alexander III sent King Kalākaua the Imperial Order of St. Alexander Nevsky, one of the highest of Russian awards, and established a permanent Russian embassy in Hawaii, along with a very small Orthodox chapel. Subsequently, Ukrainians were imported as laborers by American sugar planters.

=== Decline ===
In 1893, Queen Liliʻuokalani was deposed by U.S. Marines and American sugarcane plantation owners who were in large part the children of American Calvinist missionaries, and a provisional government was installed (see Overthrow of the Kingdom of Hawaii). In 1898, Hawaii was annexed by the United States of America. In the early 20th century, the Russian ambassador was recalled, the embassy was moved to a small office, and the Russian Orthodox chapel was closed.

Saint Innocent of Alaska also made a brief stop-over in Hawaii during his travels from Asia to Western America.

=== Rebirth ===
On November 27, 1910 (O.S.], the Feast Day of the Znamenny-Kursk Root Icon of the Sign of the Mother of God), reader services were organized and served by Vasily Pasderin.

In 1915, after the Russian Orthodox community in Hawaii (and the Episcopal Bishop Henry B. Restarick) sent an official request to the Holy Governing Synod in St. Petersburg, a priest was dispatched (with the blessing of Archbishop Evdokim (Meschersky) of the Aleutians|Evdokim (Meschersky) of the Aleutians) to pastor the large population of Orthodox Russian faithful. The new priest, Protopresbyter Jacob Korchinsky, established permanent liturgical services in Hawaiʻi, and on Christmas December 25 (O.S.) / January 7 (N.S.), 1916, he celebrated the Divine Liturgy at Saint Andrew's Episcopal Cathedral in Honolulu. Thus Orthodoxy was re-established in Hawaii.

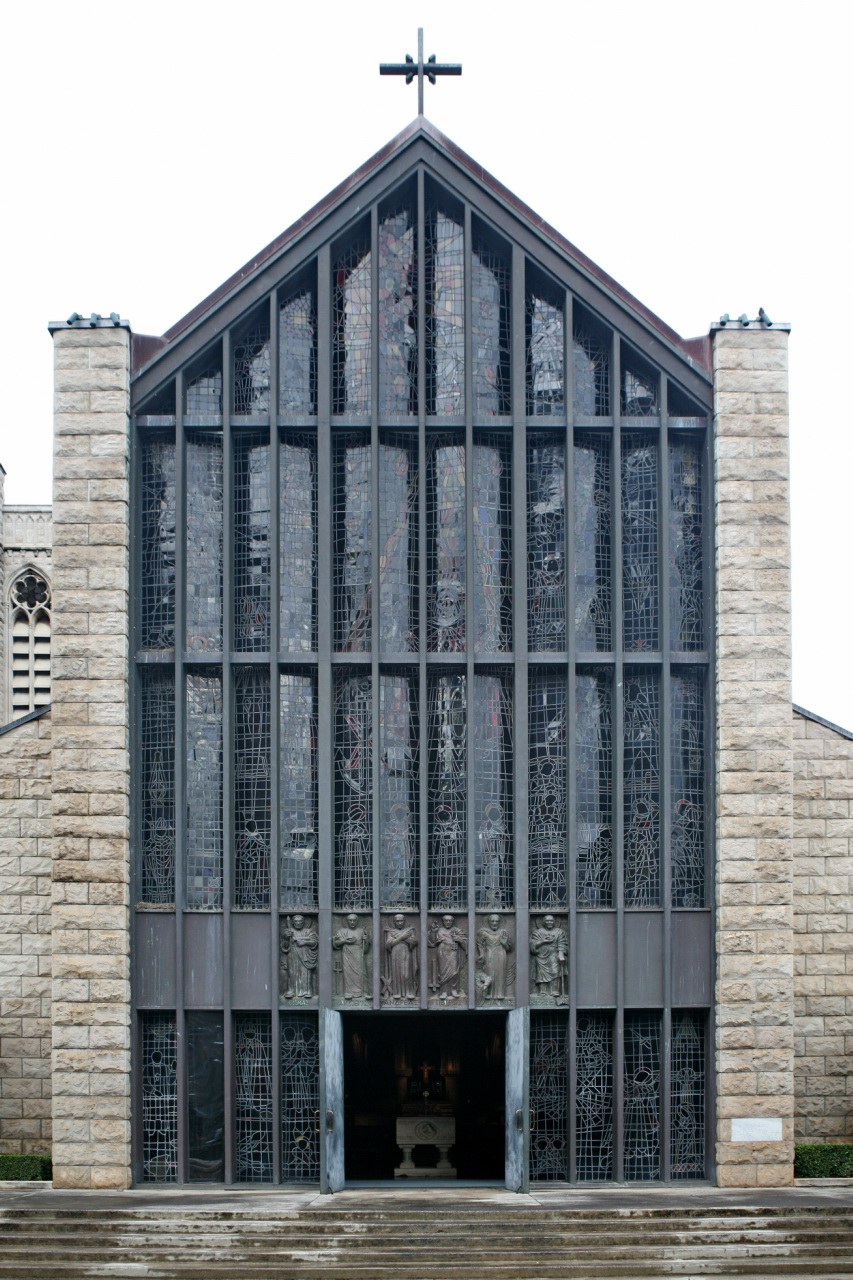
St. Andrew's Episcopal as it appears today in downtown Honolulu

Fr. Jacob, a well-known missionary priest, established churches in Canada, the United States, Alaska, Australia and the Philippines. He was murdered in Odessa shortly after the Bolshevik Revolution in Russia, but has not yet been officially recognized as a martyred saint (though, for martyrs, no official canonization is necessary in the Orthodox Church).

St. Tikhon of Moscow once quoted Fr. Jacob's missionary exploits this way, "He did much to convert the heathen to the Christian Faith and returned many Uniates to the Orthodox Church. He set the foundation for parish life in many places, built churches and assisted the unfortunate with his acquired medical knowledge."

In subsequent years, the Russian Orthodox Church sent priests by boat or airplane to Hawaii to care for the dwindling Orthodox population, becoming part of the Russian Orthodox Church Outside Russia (ROCOR). Archimandrite Innokenty Dronov of Hilo, a contemporary of St. Jonah of Hankou and St. John of Shanghai and San Francisco and Metropolitan Meletius of Harbin, served the entire Orthodox Christian flock on all the Hawaiian Islands throughout the 1930s and 1940s. Fr. Innokenty had a large following of Japanese Orthodox Christians. He frequently returned to the Diocese in San Francisco to report to Archbishops Apollinary (Koshevoy) and Tikhon (Troitsky) as well as for medical reasons. He is now purportedly buried on the Big Island of Hawaiʻi.

== List of churches present ==
Until the 1960s, the Russian Orthodox Church was the only Orthodox jurisdiction in the islands. Following the 1960s, parishes from three other jurisdictions established themselves in the Islands: the Greek Orthodox Church, the Serbian Orthodox Church, and the OCA. At one point there were as many as five different Orthodox jurisdictions in the Hawaiian Islands. Despite this multiplicity of jurisdictions, all Eastern Orthodox churches in Hawaii are in full communion with one another and have friendly relations. (See also: Eastern Orthodoxy in North America and Assembly of Canonical Orthodox Bishops of the United States of America).

=== Russian Orthodox Church ===
In the late 1960s, a group of Russian Orthodox Christians parted ways with the local Greek community and joined the Russian Orthodox Church under the omophorion (jurisdiction) of Archbishop Anthony of Los Angeles; they formed the St. Mark of Ephesus Russian Orthodox Mission. In the early 1980s, this mission parish was later re-consecrated under the heavenly protection of the Mother of God and is now known as the Holy Theotokos of Iveron Russian Orthodox Church. In the late 1990s, the pastor of the Russian Orthodox community, Father Anatole Lyovin, was ordained to serve the Orthodox faithful in Hawaii. The parish recently purchased a large church building on Oahu, and serve a full cycle of services each week. Every Wednesday, a service to the Mother of God is chanted before the Wonderworking Hawaiian Iveron Icon. The Holy Theotokos of Iveron Russian Orthodox Church is served by four priests and one deacon: Priest Nectarios Yangson (Rector), Archpriest Anatole Lyovin, Archpriest Octavian Mahler, Archpriest Konstantin Sorrell and Deacon Seraphim Andov.

This church houses the world famous “Hawaiian“ Iveron Icon of the Mother of God. A Miracleworking image of the Virgin Mary that exudes an oily and fragrant substance called “myrrh”. This phenomenon was officially recognized by the Russian Orthodox Church as a genuine miracle of God in 2008. The Holy Icon has traveled to over 2,000 churches around the world and has been venerated by millions of Christian faithful.

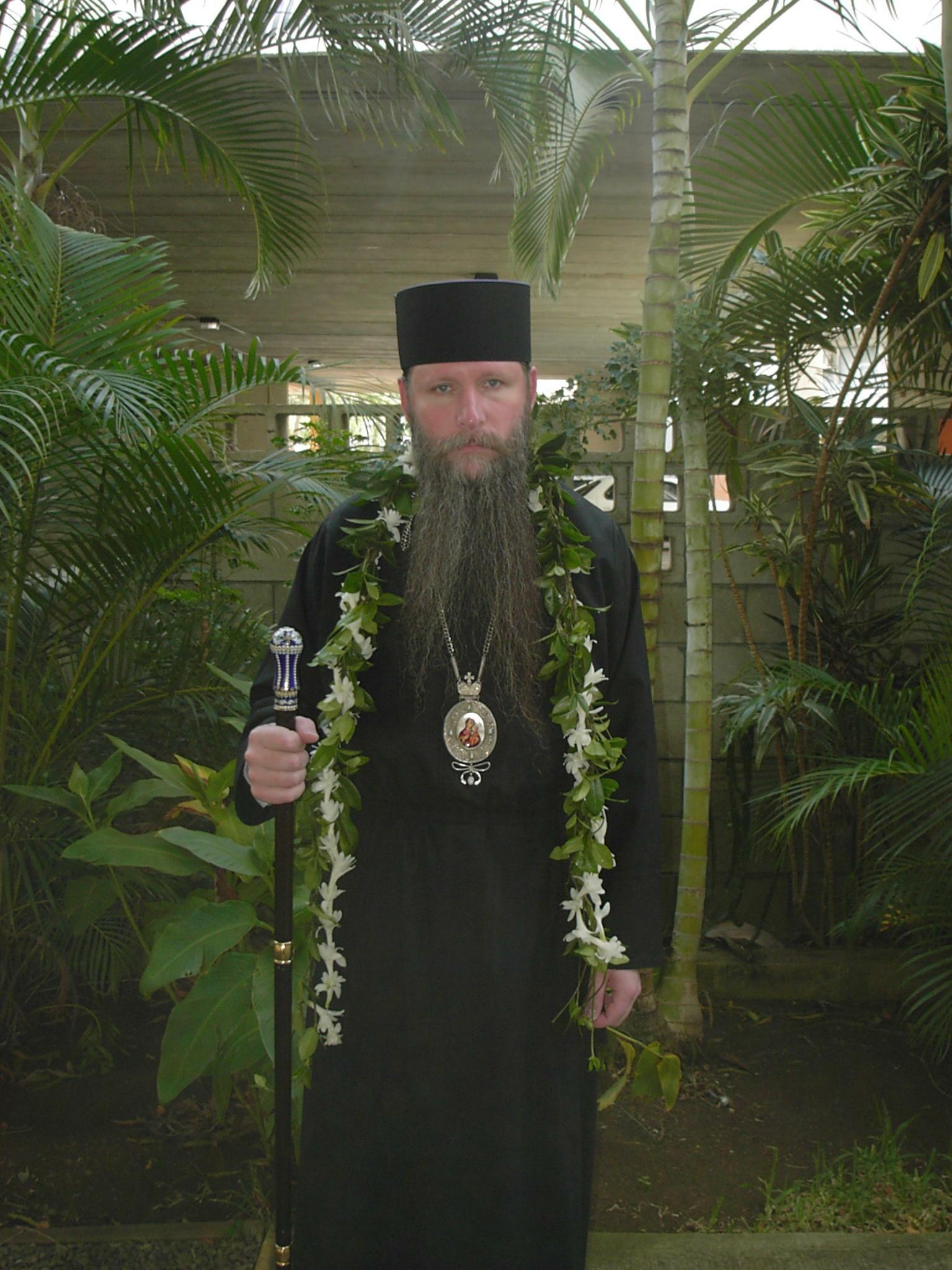
Archbishop Kyrill on an archpastoral visit to Hilo, Kona and Honolulu in 2003

=== Greek Orthodox Church ===
In the mid 1960s, a Greek Orthodox community established a mission under the auspices of the Greek Orthodox Archdiocese of America. This community became known as the Saints Constantine and Helen Greek Orthodox Church. In 2026 the current pastor of the Greek Orthodox community in Hawaiʻi is Priest Alexander Leong, who was assigned to the parish in Honolulu in 2008. This community is well known for its annual Greek Festival held at Ala Moana Beach Park near Waikiki. This community is under the care of Bishop-Metropolitan Gerasimos of San Francisco (GOARCH).

=== Serbian Orthodox Church ===
In the early 1990s, a Serbian community established a Serbian Orthodox mission dedicated to St. Lazar of Kosovo. The Serbian mission later became inactive, and its remaining members joined the local Russian and Greek churches. There has been a recent interest within the Serbian Orthodox community in Hawaiʻi to re-establish this mission. In recent months, visiting clergy (including the Serbian Bishop Maxim of Western America) have come from the mainland to minister to them.

=== Greek Antiochian Orthodox Church ===
In 2003, the short-lived St. Paul the Apostle Antiochian Orthodox Mission was established in Honolulu at Fort Shafter Army Base. The rector of this mission was Fr. Isaiah Gillette, a chaplain with the military. Following Fr. Isaiah's transfer to Texas, the mission was disbanded. There is currently a small community under the care of a priest from the Antiochian Orthodox Church, who visits Oʻahu on a regular basis.

=== Orthodox Church in America ===
In early 2004, a new Orthodox community under the jurisdiction of the Orthodox Church in America (OCA) was established in Kona, on the western side of the Big Island. Fr. Sergius Naumann served this community for a time until leaving for Alaska. They were without a priest for about 18 months. In Autumn, 2007 the community was given the name of St. Juvenaly - the first Orthodox Church to have St. Juvenaly as their patron. The mission is under the auspices of Bp. Benjamin (Peterson) of the West (OCA). On the eastern side of the Big Island, the Holy Ascension Orthodox Church was also established recently in Honomu, Hawaii.

== Parishes ==
=== Oahu ===
- Holy Theotokos of Iveron Russian Orthodox Church of Hawaiʻi — official web site
- Ss. Constantine and Helen Greek Orthodox Cathedral of the Pacific — official web site
- St. Lazar Serbian Orthodox Mission Parish — 2007 News site (No official web site)

=== Kauai ===
- The Orthodox Christian Mission of Kauai — Mission Website (served by clergy from the Holy Theotokos of Iveron Orthodox Church)

=== Maui ===
- Maui Mission Parish — official web site - (New website)

=== Big island of Hawaii ===
- Na Pua Li'i Hermitage & Hermitage Farm (ROCOR) official website
- St. Juvenally Orthodox Mission - serving the Big Island and based in Kona - official website

== Sources ==
- Archimandrite Avgustin (Nikitin); Gavraiskie ostrova i Rossiia (Obzor tserkovnykh sviazei i kontaktov) - (Saint-Petersburg; Minneapolis 2002)
- Michael Protopopov; A History of the Russian Orthodox Presence in Australia (Submitted Thesis)
- Pacific Commercial Advertiser, January 23, 1916
