= John Auld =

John Auld may refer to:

- John Auld (footballer) (1862–1932), Scottish footballer
- John Auld (painter) (1914–1996), British painter
- John Allan Auld (1853–1924), Canadian politician
- Sir John Auld Mactaggart, 4th Baronet (born 1951), Scottish entrepreneur and philanthropist

== See also ==
- Auld (surname)
- John Gray (nightwatchman) (died 1858), owner of Greyfriars Bobby
- Johnny Ould (1940–2014), British boxer
