= Aulds =

Aulds is a surname. Notable people with the surname include:

- Leslie Aulds (1920–1999), American baseball player
- Lonnie O. Aulds (1925–1984), American businessman and politician

== See also ==
- Auld (surname)
