= Harriet Kawahinekipi =

Hawaiian noble (c.1823–1843)

Harriet Kawahinekipi Kaumualiʻi
- Born: c. 1823; Kauaʻi
- Died: September 3, 1843; Maui?
- Burial: Maria Lanakila Catholic Church
- Spouse: John Meek Jr.
- Father: George Prince Kaumualiʻi Humehume
- Mother: Elizabeth Peke Davis

Harriet Kawahinekipi Kaumualiʻi (c. 1823–1843) was a Hawaiian noble during the Kingdom of Hawaii. She was a high chiefess as the granddaughter of Isaac Davis Aikake, the royal advisor to King Kamehameha I.

== Early life and family ==
Harriet was born c. 1823 as Harriet Kaumualiʻi.

Harriet's father was George "Prince" Kaumualiʻi, eldest son of King Kaumualiʻi, the last independent ruler of the island of Kauaʻi. George was a veteran of the War of 1812, but would not inherit the kingdom.

Her mother was Elizabeth Peke (Betty), the youngest daughter of Isaac Davis, from Milford Haven, Wales who was an important military advisor of King Kamehameha I during his conquest of the islands.

She had an older sister named Kamakahai who was adopted by another chiefess and an older brother who died young in 1822.

In 1824, her grandfather Kaumualiʻi, the vassal king of Kauaʻi who had been exiled by Kamehameha II and forced to marry Queen Kaʻahumanu, died in Honolulu. Harriet's father started a rebellion on Kauaʻi, challenging the rule of King Kamehameha II and Queen Kaʻahumanu. Hoapili and Kalanimoku, the Prime Minister, were the main commanders for the Kingdom. The rebellion was routed. George and Betty escaped on horseback to the mountains with their infant daughter. Harriet and her mother were soon captured by the troops of Kalanimoku.

They were treated with kindness and the Queen regent nicknamed the child ka wahine kipi ("The Rebel Woman" in the Hawaiian language), in reference to the 1824 battle, a name that stayed with her for the rest of her life. George was captured in a few weeks and they returned his wife and child, but forced him into exile on Oʻahu. George died shortly after, never to see his homeland ever again.

== Marriage ==
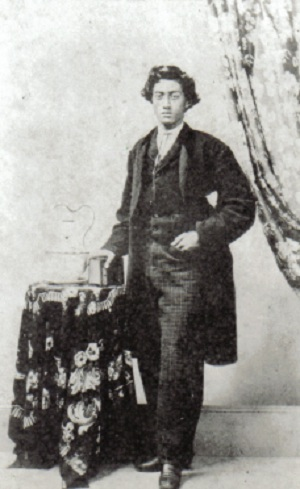
John Kanipookalani Meek (1848-1879), John Meek Jr. son, from his second marriage.

Harriet married John Meek Jr., the son of Captain John Meek, on March 28, 1837, at Honolulu, Oahu. Meek was a hapa-haole and was two years her senior.

== Death ==
She died on September 3, 1843, at the age of about 20, three years prior to her own mother. She is buried in the cemetery of the Maria Lanakila Catholic Church on Maui.

Her husband remarried in 1846 to a woman named Kepoʻokalani and had another son who he named John, who would become the first native Hawaiian photographer. Meek died the same year.
