= Mary Auld =

Scottish politician and woman's organizer

- Born: Mary Jardine; 8 July 1893; Lockerbie, Scotland
- Died: 3 July 1984 (aged 90); Airdrie, North Lanarkshire, Scotland
- Occupation(s): Politician and women's organizer
- Organization(s): Independent Labour Party; Scottish Labour Party
- Children: Jenny Auld

Mary Auld (née Jardine; 8 July 1893 – 3 July 1984) was a Scottish politician and women's organizer.

== Life ==
Born in Lockerbie as Mary Jardine, she attended Lockerbie Academy, then moved to Glasgow to marry her cousin, John Marshall. Marshall died during World War I, and to support her three step-children, Mary found work at Weir's munitions works in Cathcart. This experience led her to join the Independent Labour Party, and become a pacifist and agnostic.

In 1920, Mary married Jimmy Auld, and the two had a daughter, Jenny. In addition to her family responsibilities, she was active in the local Scottish Labour Party, and in childminding for women attending the Women's Welfare and Advisory Clinic, an early family planning clinic. From the late 1920s, she increased her political activity, serving on the executive of the Labour Party's Glasgow section, and chairing its Women's Advisory Council. She served on the executive of the Scottish council of the party from 1932, and in 1937 became the second woman to serve as chair of the party.

In 1941, following the death of Agnes Lauder, Auld was appointed as women's organiser of the Scottish Labour Party. She avoided public speaking, focusing on promoting policy development in the areas most relevant to women's lives, on encouraging women to stand for Parliament, and fundraising activities.

== Later years ==
In 1958, she retired, moving to East Kilbride, her husband dying just months later. She continued attending Labour meetings.

Auld died from heart failure on 3 July 1984, at the age of 90, and was cremated at Linn crematorium, Glasgow.

Trade union offices
Preceded by Agnes Lauder	Women's Organiser of the Scottish Labour Party; 1941–1958	Succeeded by Helen Dunphy
