= Bill Auld =

Scotland international rugby union player

- Born: William Auld; 25 April 1868 Glasgow, Scotland
- Died: 19 July 1945 (aged 77) Bridge of Weir, Scotland

Rugby union career
- Position: Forward
Amateur team(s)
Years	Team	Apps	(Points)
-	West of Scotland		
Provincial / State sides
Years	Team	Apps	(Points)
1887	Glasgow District		
1888	West of Scotland District		
International career
Years	Team	Apps	(Points)
1889-90	Scotland	2	(0)

Bill Auld OBE (25 April 1868 – 19 July 1945) was a Scotland international rugby union player.

== Rugby Union career ==
=== Amateur career ===
He played rugby union for West of Scotland.

=== Provincial career ===
He was capped by Glasgow District in the inter-city match of 1887.

He was capped by West of Scotland District in their match against East of Scotland District on 11 February 1888.

=== International career ===
Auld played twice for Scotland; in the 1889 Home Nations Championship match against Wales on 2 February 1889; and in the 1890 Home Nations Championship match against Wales on 1 February 1890.

== Military career ==
He served in the First World War in the Labour Corps and was given an O.B.E. in 1919. He was active in the Territorial Army.

== Business career ==
He became a stockbroker and was well known in the Glasgow Stock Exchange. He became its chairman in 1931-32. He was a senior partner in the firm Auld and MacEwan. On his death the National Probate Calendar lists Auld's address as the business address of Auld and McEwan as 24 St. Vincent Place, Glasgow; not using his home address of The Grange, Bridge of Weir.

== Family ==
His father was William Auld; and his mother was Isabella Black Dill.

He married Winifred Alice Burton. They had one son William Connel Auld, born in 1902; and two daughters.

His son William Connel Auld married Barbara Keelan, the daughter of D.H. Keelan of India State Railways, on the 26 November 1930 in Calcutta.
