= Doug Auld =

American sports journalist

Douglas Frank Auld (June 25, 1962 - October 10, 2021) was editor and publisher of Sprint Car & Midget Magazine.

== Background ==
Auld was born in Mahopac, New York. His father, Jack Auld, was a retired dirt modified racer, and he attended his first racing event as a toddler. The Auld family were fixtures at weekly racetracks in the Northeast.

== Radio ==
Auld began his radio career creating and hosting Short Track USA, which aired on radio stations in central Florida. The show, dubbed "The Fastest Hour On Radio", covered short-track racing, and featured a combination of national and local racers, but even the NASCAR racers that were frequent on-air guests only discussed their short-track backgrounds, and not their current NASCAR careers. Upon accepting the position of Editor of Open Wheel Magazine, Auld turned the show over to a local racetrack announcer so that it would continue to give coverage to the numerous local racetracks.

== Journalist ==
Auld started his racing journalist career in the early '90s, writing for numerous publications, including the featured Page 2 column of Motorsports Weekly. In the late '90s he also became a stringer for the Tampa Tribune, covering racing events and profiling local racers in the Tampa Bay Florida area.

In 1999, when Open Wheel Magazine - since 1980 the leading sprint car and midget racing magazine - was sold to EMAP Petersen Publishing, Auld replaced racing publishing legend and NASCAR announcer Dick Berggren as editor. Auld continued as editor until the magazine was sold to Primedia Publishing, and in the wake of 9/11 was folded. Doug Auld immediately founded Wheels-Up Publishing, Inc. and began publication of Sprint Car & Midget Magazine, which quickly took the position formerly held by Open Wheel, as the "bible" of short-track open-wheel racing.

Doug Auld was one of the few national racing media members who also continued as a racecar driver.

== Television ==
In the late '90s, Auld created and hosted a cable television program called Short Track Racing which aired in Bradenton, Florida and Sarasota, Florida, and featured drivers and highlights from local weekly racetracks.

== Awards ==
In 2017, Auld was inducted into the National Sprint Car Hall of Fame.

In 2013, Auld was awarded the Duke Dinsmore Memorial Award by the Dayton Auto Racing Fans (DARF).

In 2005, Auld was awarded the Outstanding Contribution To The Sport Award by the National Sprint Car Poll, a division of the National Sprint Car Hall of Fame. He was voted the 2000 360ci Sprint Car Media Member of the Year, the 2002 410ci Sprint Car Media Member of the Year, in 2003 both the 360 Sprint Car Media Member of the Year and the 410 Sprint Car Media Member of the Year, in 2006 the 360 Sprint Car Media Member of the Year and in 2007 the Non-Winged Sprint Car Media Member of the Year.

In 2002, Auld was awarded the Gene Powlen Fan Appreciation Award by the Hoosier Auto Racing Fans (HARF) Association, one of the country's oldest auto racing fan associations.

== Other ==
In 2006 Auld created the Sprint Car & Midget Magazine Stay In School Program, a program in which race teams bring their racing operations to schools throughout the United States and Canada for assemblies encouraging students to consider and continue their education.

From 2006 to 2007 Doug Auld served as President of the Board of Directors of the National Sprint Car Hall of Fame & Museum in Knoxville, Iowa.

== Death ==
Auld died on October 10, 2021 at his home following what was described as a "brief illness."
