= Elizabeth Peke Davis =

Hawaiian high chiefess (1803–1860)

- Born: 1803; Waimea, Hawaii Island
- Died: 1860 (aged 56–57)
- Spouse: Humehume; Antone Sylva
- Issue: Harriet Kawahinekipi Kamakahai
Names
- Elizabeth Peke Davis
- House: Kekaulike
- Father: Isaac Davis Aikake
- Mother: Kalukuna

Elizabeth Peke Davis (1803–1860) was a Hawaiian Kingdom high chiefess, the hapa haole daughter of Isaac Davis, the Welsh advisor of Kamehameha I, who helped him unify the island in 1810. She was the wife of George Prince Kaumualiʻi, also known as Humehume.

== Early life ==
Betty was born on February 12 or December 24, 1803, at Waimea, Hawaii Island. Her 45-year-old father, Isaac Davis from Milford Haven, Wales, known as ʻAikake by Hawaiians, was one of Kamehameha's closest friends and advisors. He was treated like nobility due to his service. He was given the title High Chief, and owned vast tracts of land. Her mother was the chiefess Kalukuna, a relative of Kamehameha I, and her father's second wife. She was given the name of Elizabeth and often referred to as Betty or Peke, the Hawaiian version of Betty. She was the youngest sister of Sarah "Kale" Kaniaulono Davis and George Hueu Davis.

Tragedy struck her father in 1810. ʻAikake was poisoned by the chiefs who disliked the peaceful capitulation of the Kingdom of Kauaʻi, under King Kaumualiʻi, into a vassal state of King Kamehameha. After his death, his close companion, John Young, looked after Betty and her brother and sister. Two of them were living with him in 1807, and after Davis's murder Young continued to raise them along with his own five children James, her future-brother-in-law; Fanny, mother of Emma Rooke; Grace, hānai (foster) mother of Emma; John, future premier or kuhina nui; and Jane, mother of Peter Kaeo and Albert Kunuiakea, at his homestead at Kawaihae. In his will, dated 1834, Young divided his lands equally between all his and Davis's children.

== Marriages ==
Betty married twice. Her first marriage was to Humehume, known as George Prince Kaumualiʻi, the son of King Kaumualiʻi and a commoner. George was five years her senior and a veteran of the War of 1812. Due to her mother-in-law's status, George was not in line to follow the father as King or even vassal king of Kauaʻi. George was well educated, having been to New England for an education. Soon after arriving on The Thaddeus, he met and married Peke Davis. He called her his "rib". They sailed to Kauai to reunite with King Kaumualii. After the death of his father, Kauai was unstable. Many chiefs did not want to follow the new government under King Kamehameha. During the Rebellion of 1824, Humehume and others lost to the forces of Kamehameha. Humehume and Betty were caught and brought to Honolulu, where he died less than two years later from the flu. Betty was a widow at age 23. George and Betty had a son in early 1821, but the boy died in February 1823. Mercy Whitney described the burial: "A regular procession of two and two followed the corpse. Going into the fort in which the grave was dug seemed like entering a burying ground, more so than anything I have witnessed since I left America." The fort was Paʻulaʻula o Hipo, a former heiau. The infant was part Hawaiian and part foreign. Betty and George had another daughter in 1821, who was given to another chiefess because George had no desire for a girl. From the same journal it is noted that Peke gave birth on Nov 25, 1821 to a girl. This girl is said to be Kamakahai, who had several surviving children. In 1824, another girl was born, Harriet Kaumualiʻi, following her father's surname. The name Kawahinekipi was given to her by Kaahumanu while she was an infant in Oahu. She married John Meek Jr., but died in 1843, childless. Kamakahai named her daughter Hattie Kaumuali'i'kalani Kanaina after her.

Betty's second marriage was to Antone Sylva, also known as Antonio Sylva (1807–1887), and this match was childless.

== Later life ==
American missionary Hiram Bingham described Betty in 1824: "Betty was more fair, of more European feature and slender make than most of her countrywomen at the age of 25 or 30; more taciturn, thoughtful, sedate, and retiring than others of equal rank and intelligence. She had derived some advantages from the instructions of the missionaries, and manifested some concern for her salvation. But her circumstances differed little from those of the wife of a petty chief of the lowest rank."

She died in 1860.
