= Kaʻahumanu Society =

Civic organization in Hawaii, US

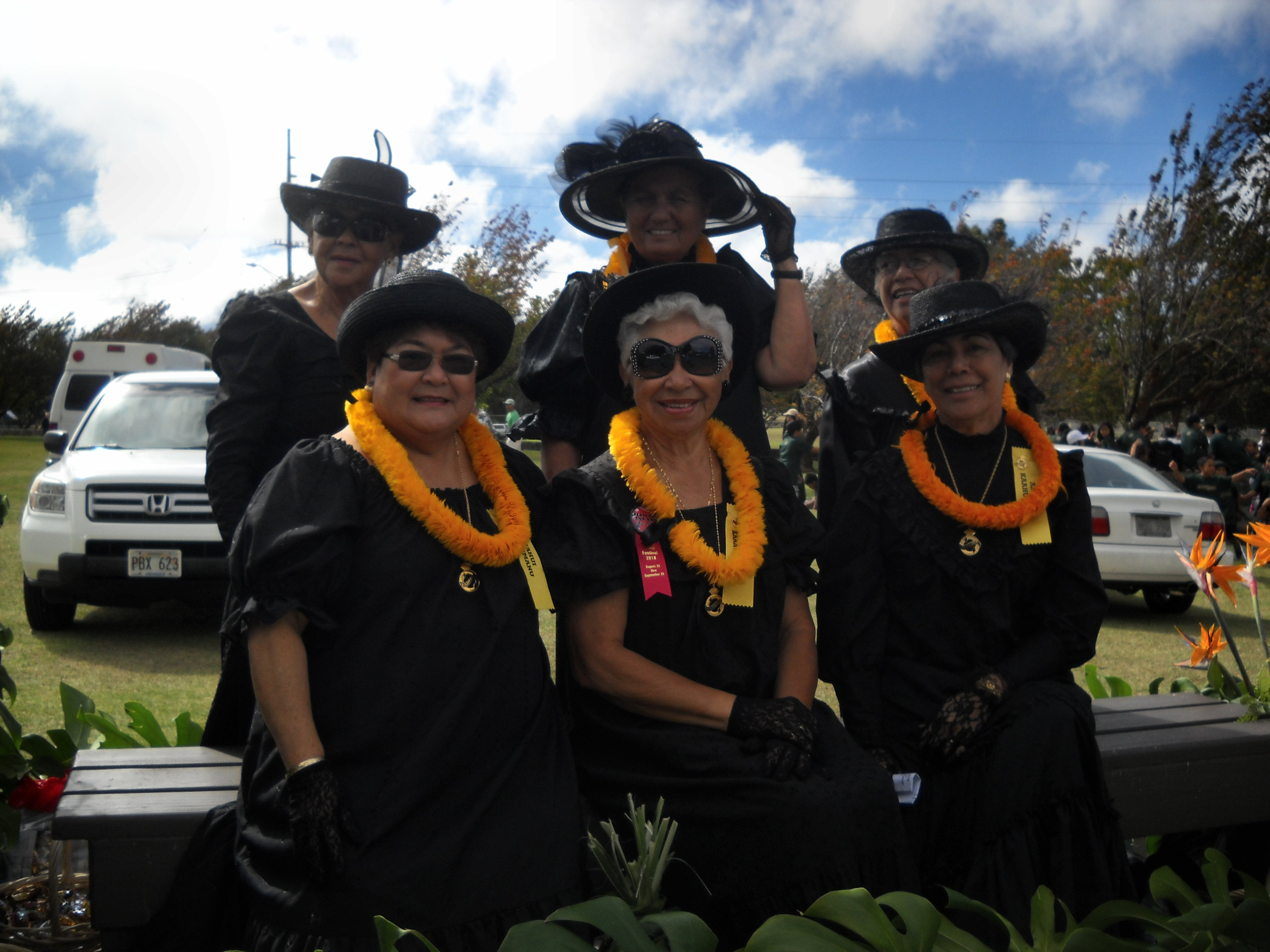
Members of the Kaʻahumanu Society wearing their iconic black dresses, 2010

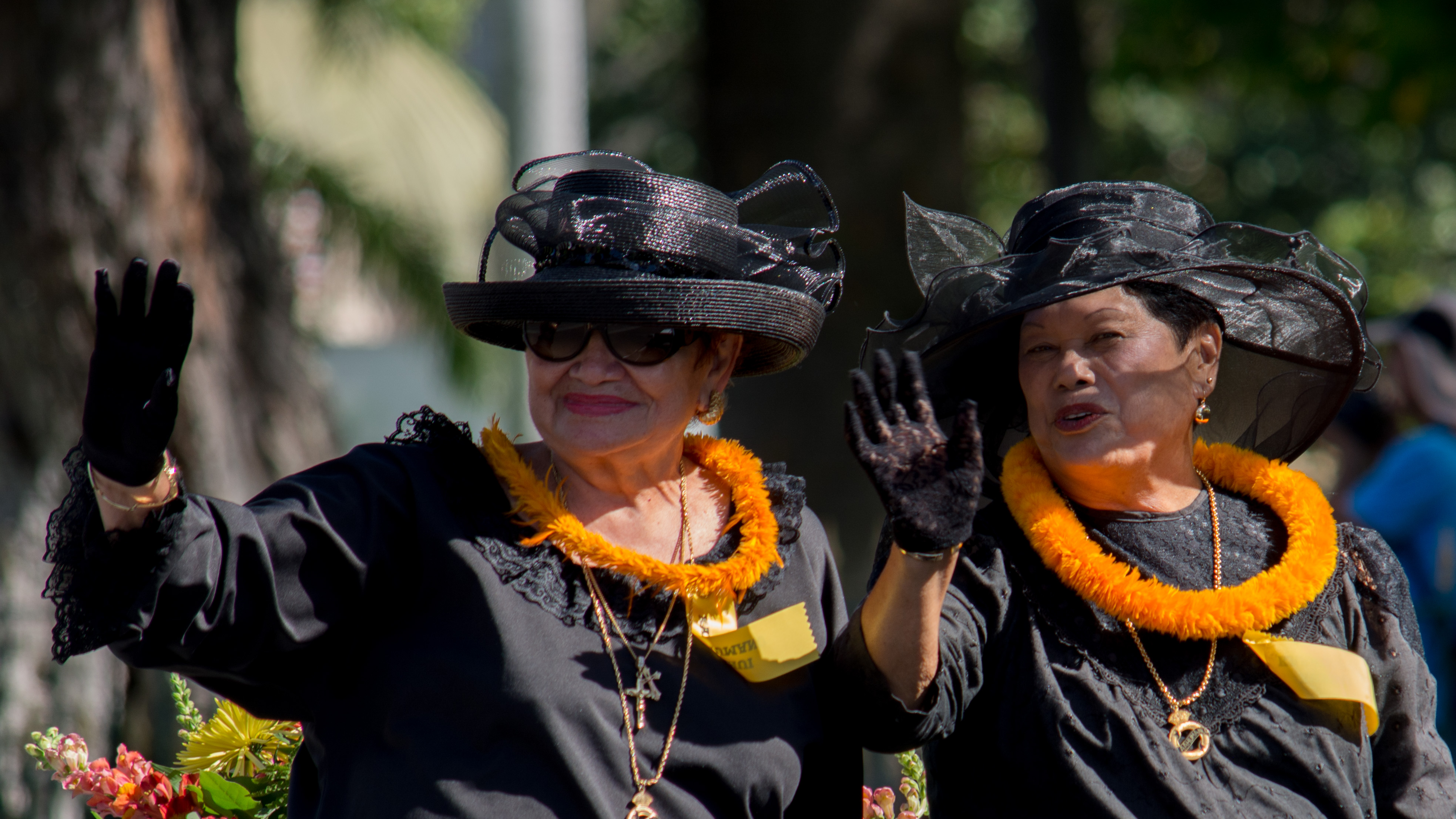
Members of the Kaʻahumanu Society during the 2016 Kamehameha Day Parade

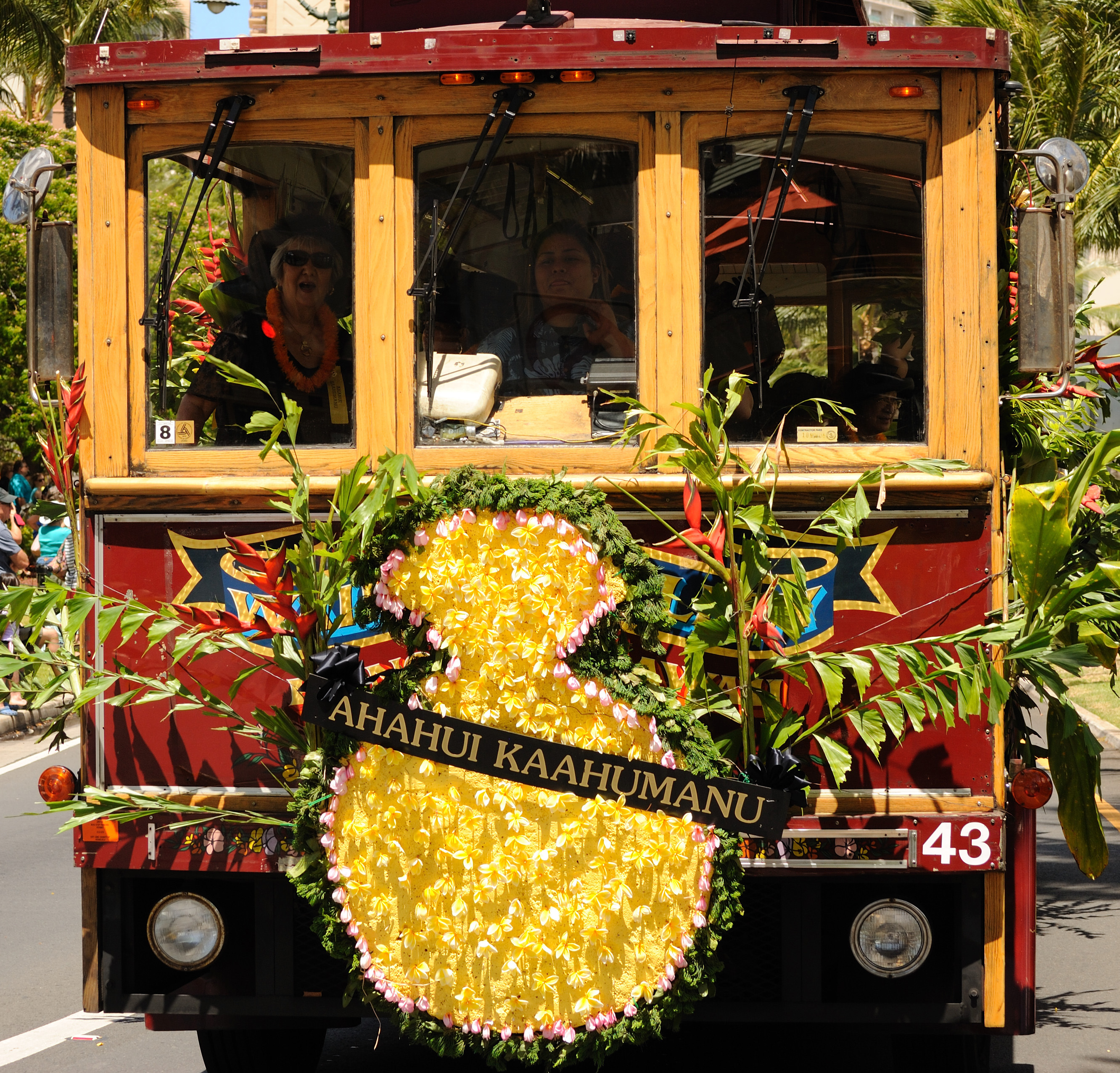
Members of the Kaʻahumanu Society at the 2012 Kamehameha Day Parade

The Kaʻahumanu Society (official name: ʻAhahui Kaʻahumanu) is a civic club in Hawaii formed by Princess Victoria Kamāmalu in 1864 for the relief of the elderly and the ill. The club celebrates the life of Queen Kaʻahumanu and the preservation of Hawaiian culture.

== History ==
The Kaʻahumanu Society is the oldest Hawaiian civic society, predating the Royal Order of Kamehameha I by a year. It was founded, at Kawaiahaʻo Church, on August 8, 1864 by Princess Victoria Kamāmalu, the sister and heir-apparent of King Kamehameha V. Other founding officers included Bernice Pauahi Bishop, the founder of Kamehameha Schools, and the future Queen Liliuokalani. Named after Queen Kaʻahumanu, the favorite wife of King Kamehameha I and the Kuhina Nui (co-ruler, or regent) of his successors, the organization celebrated traditional Hawaiian female leadership. The organization's original mission was to nurse victims of the smallpox epidemic and provide proper burial for the dead. It was disbanded after Princess Victoria's death in 1866.

On June 14, 1905, after an abeyance of thirty-nine years, the group was rechartered under the leadership of Lucy Kaopaulu Peabody, a lady-in-waiting of the former Hawaiian royal court, and a group of eleven women, in a ceremony at Kawaiahaʻo Church. The organization chose not to invite the deposed Queen Liliuokalani to join even though she had been an original member of the 1864 club.

Today, women of the society wear black muʻumuʻu dresses with yellow lei hulu, black gloves and hat, all symbolic of Queen Kaʻahumanu. Memberships are restricted to women of Native Hawaiian descent who are invited to join. There are nine chapters across Hawaii. The modern group continued the original mission of nursing the sick and the elderly and aiding in burial expenses for the deceased while also fundraising for charitable causes, promoting Hawaiian culture and representing the Hawaiian monarchy at special events such as the annual Kamehameha Day parades.

== Bibliography ==
- Allen, Helena G. (1982). The Betrayal of Liliuokalani: Last Queen of Hawaii, 1838–1917. Glendale, CA: A. H. Clark Company. ISBN 978-0-87062-144-4. OCLC 9576325.
- Kanahele, George S. (1999). Emma: Hawaii's Remarkable Queen. Honolulu: University of Hawaii Press. ISBN 978-0-8248-2240-8. OCLC 40890919.
- Peterson, Barbara Bennett (1984). "Victoria Kamamalu". Notable Women of Hawaii. Honolulu: University of Hawaii Press. pp. 192–194. ISBN 978-0-8248-0820-4. OCLC 11030010.
