= Susan Mary Auld =

Naval architect in the UK

- Born: January 10, 1915; Tynemouth
- Died: March 9, 2002 (aged 87); Newcastle upon Tyne
- Other name: Susan Denham Christie
- Education: Cheltenham Ladies College Durham University
- Occupation: Naval Architect

Susan Mary Auld (10 January 1915 – 9 March 2002), born Susan Denham Christie in Tynemouth, was the first woman to graduate as a naval architect from Durham University.

== Family background and education ==
Susan Auld came from a family of naval engineers. Her grandfather Charles John Denham Christie (1830–1905) was a founder of the company that later became the Swan Hunter Group of shipyards, and her father John Denham Christie (d. 1950) was company chairman for many years. Her mother was Mary Martin.

She received home schooling until the age of 14, when she was sent to Cheltenham Ladies' College. In 1932 she began to study naval architecture under Sir Westcott Abell at Durham University and graduated with a BSc in 1936, the first English woman to be awarded a degree in naval architecture (but see Dorothy Rowntree). She was also the first woman to be admitted as a student member to the North East Coast Institution of Engineers and Shipbuilders (October 1932), although Katherine Parsons had been made an honorary fellow in 1919.

== Career ==
Susan Denham Christie joined the design office of Swan, Hunter, and Wigham Richardson at the Neptune yard on Tyneside, at a time when very few women were employed in the shipbuilding industry, and she went on to be a pioneering architect for the Royal Navy. The Woman Engineer reported in 1942 that "Lloyd's List of 25th February contained news of the only woman ship designer in the country. She is Miss S. M. Denham Christie..." and that she had recently been admitted as an Associate Member of the North East Coast Institution of Engineers and Shipbuilders. During the Second World War Susan Denham Christie was involved in the design of the battleship HMS Anson, launched in 1940, and the aircraft carrier HMS Albion, launched in 1947 (the keel of which was laid down in 1944). She also worked on the design of floating vessels used to land Allied troops in France on D-Day in 1944.

After the war Susan Denham Christie worked on commercial and cargo shipbuilding. She was a member of the team that designed the Leda, which ferried passengers between Tyneside and Norway.

== Personal life ==
In 1952 she married an electrical engineer, John Gwynne Auld. Although she gave up her career as a naval architect when she married, for many years she was a correspondent for The Shipyard magazine, the in-house company magazine of Swan, Hunter, and Wigham Richardson.

Susan Auld died in Newcastle upon Tyne on 9 March 2002.

== Commemoration ==
A blue plaque was unveiled to honour Susan Auld at 12 Northumberland Terrace in Tynemouth on 21 October 2022 by North Tyneside Council and heritage charity The Common Room.
