= Eva Auld Watson =

American painter

Eva Auld Watson (1888 – December 16, 1948) was an American painter, printmaker, muralist, illustrator and bookbinder.

== Biography ==
Eva Auld Watson was born as Eva Auld on a cattle ranch in Bandera, Texas in 1888. She attended the Pratt Institute where she attended classes of Ernest William Watson whom she married on June 21, 1911 in Pittsburgh Pennsylvania. They had two sons, Lyn (Merlin) Auld Watson and painter Aldren Auld Watson (1917-2013).

Watson's prints were highly stylized and studied, developed and used similar blockprinting techniques to Ernest. In 1940, she illustrated Chuck Martinez by Priscilla Horton which was published by Longmans, Green and Company. Watson exhibited work at the 1915 Panama Pacific International Exposition, the Indianapolis Museum of Art and the U.S. National Museum, Smithsonian Institution.

She died in New York City on December 16, 1948.
