= Jenny Auld =

Scottish politician

- Born: Janet Montgomery Jardine Auld; 1921; Glasgow, Scotland, U.K.
- Died: 16 February 2017 (aged 95–96)
- Occupation: Politician
- Mother: Mary Auld

Janet Montgomery Jardine Auld (1921 – 16 February 2017), known as Jenny Auld, was a Scottish politician.

== Biography ==
Born in Glasgow, Auld was the daughter of Mary Auld, a prominent figure in the Scottish Labour Party. She attended Hutchesons' Girls' Grammar School, then studied at the University of Glasgow. She served in the Auxiliary Territorial Service during World War II rising to the rank of sergeant.

Auld stood for the Scottish Labour Party in Ayr at the 1951 UK general election, taking second place, with 15,702 votes.

She later trained as a teacher, working at Duncanrig Secondary School from 1957, and moving to East Kilbride.

She campaigned for East Kilbride to be made a small burgh, which was achieved in 1963. It was granted a town council, to which Auld was elected, becoming its first Senior Bailie. From 1966 to 1972, she served on the town's development corporation, and in 1993 she became the only woman to be made a freeman of the town.

She served a term as chair of the Scottish Labour Party.
