= Andrew Auld =

Scottish carpenter (1799–1873)

- Born: August 8, 1799; Linlithgow, Scotland
- Died: October 26, 1873 (aged 74); Oahu, Hawaii
- Occupation: Carpenter
- Spouse: Kamoku
- Children: William, Angis, Mary, Alexander, James

Andrew Auld (September 8, 1799 – October 26, 1873) was a native of Linlithgow, Scotland. He was the best friend of Captain Alexander Adams, who commanded Kamehameha I's navy. He was a ship's carpenter and wheelwright. He arrived in the Hawaiian Islands in 1816. He was a close friend of Adams for 40 years and is buried next to Adams in Nuʻuanu at the Oʻahu Cemetery. Their joint tombstone contains the following couplet in the Scots dialect: "Twa croanies frae the land of heather / Are sleepin' here in death th'gether."

His son William Auld was an aide to King Kalākaua. He married Mary Adams, the daughter of Captain Alexander Adams, in 1859. He was also a member of the Hui Aloha ʻAina and was one of three delegates who took a large petition protesting Hawaii's annexation to America to Washington D.C. Auld was also a successful businessman in Honolulu and owned several businesses. Auld Lane in Honolulu is named after William Auld.

Another son, James Auld, was a member of the Hawaii Liberal Party.

Another son, Alexander Auld, married Loika.
