= Isaac Davis (advisor) =

Welsh High Chief (c.1758–1810)

- High Chief ʻAikake
- Born: c.1758 Milford Haven, Wales, Kingdom of Great Britain
- Died: April 1810; Honolulu, Oahu, Kingdom of Hawaii
- Spouse: Nakai Nalimaʻaluʻalu; Kalukuna
- Issue: Sarah Kaniʻaulono; Elizabeth Peke; George Hueu

Isaac Davis (c. 1758–1810) was a Welsh advisor to Kamehameha I, who recruited him to help conquer the other kingdoms in Hawaii, resulting in formation of the Kingdom of Hawaii. He arrived in Hawaii in 1790 as the sole survivor of the massacre of the crew of Fair American. Davis and John Young became friends and advisors to Kamehameha. Davis brought western military knowledge to Hawaii and played a prominent role during Hawaii's first contacts with the European powers. He spent the rest of his life in Hawaiʻi and was known as ʻAikake.

== Life ==
Isaac Davis was born about 1758 in Milford Haven, Wales. He was a seaman on the American schooner Fair American, commanded by Thomas Humphrey Metcalfe, engaged with a larger companionship, the Eleanora, in the maritime fur trade between the Pacific Northwest and China.

In 1790, the Eleanora was under Captain Simon Metcalfe, when one of his skiffs was stolen by chief Kaʻōpūiki at Honuaula on Maui. Metcalfe nevertheless invited the locals to trade with him, only to fire his cannons at the approaching canoes with unarmed traders, killing more than 100 Hawaiians at Olowalu.

Metcalfe also once mistreated Kameʻeiamoku, a high chief on the island of Hawaii, and one of the sacred pio twins, by whipping him. The humiliated Kameʻeiamoku swore vengeance on the next ship to arrive. He attacked Fair American at Kaʻūpūlehu, which was under the command of Metcalfe's 18-year-old son, Thomas. Thomas and all of Fair American's crew were killed, except for Isaac Davis, the sole survivor of the attack, who was tied to a canoe and left nearly dead. It is said that Davis's life was spared because of his brave fighting. An alternative historical account that originated in a Hawaiian language newspaper in the early 20th century states that Kamehameha did not kill the crew of Fair American.

In March 1790, Simon Metcalfe left his boatswain, John Young, ashore and sailed away from the Hawaiian Islands without knowing that his son had been killed. Fair American was taken over by Kamehameha. Davis was nursed back to health by an American beachcomber named Isaac Ridler. Like his friend Young, Davis assisted Kamehameha in his dealings with foreigners and in wars of conquest.

Davis was known as ʻAikake, the translation into Hawaiian, of his given name Isaac—from /ˈaɪzək/ to /ˈaɪzɑkɛ/, Isaac"eh", to /ˈaɪkəkɛ/ (ʻAikake). He was given the status of a high chief and married a relative of King Kamehameha I. He was appointed Governor of Oʻahu, and owned estates on Oʻahu, Maui, Molokaʻi, and the Big Island.

== Family ==
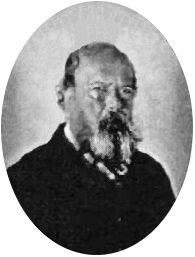
Davis's son George in later life

Davis first married Nakai Nalimaʻaluʻalu, a chiefess with whom he had one daughter in 1797, Sarah (Sally or Kale) Kaniʻaulono Davis, named after his sister Sarah in Wales. Kale Davis lived in Honokaula, Maui, had six children and died in 1867.

After Nakai died in the ukuʻu plague, Davis married Kalukuna, a relative of Kamehameha, in Honolulu, and founded a prominent family in the islands. They had two children. His son George Hueu Davis was born on 10 January 1800. His daughter Elizabeth "Betty" Peke Davis was born on February 12, 1803. His son married Kahaanapilo Papa and Kalapuna and had many descendants; among them was his son Isaac Young Davis who was the second husband of Princess Ruth Keʻelikōlani and his granddaughter Lucy Kaopaulu Peabody who served as a maid of honor and lifelong companion to Queen Emma of Hawaii. His daughter Betty married George Prince Kaumualiʻi (also known as Humehume), the son of King Kaumualiʻi of Kauaʻi.

After his death, his companion John Young looked after his children. Two of them were living with him in 1807, and after Davis's murder in 1810 Young continued to care for them. In Young's will, dated 1834, he divided his lands equally between both his own and Davis's children.

== Death ==
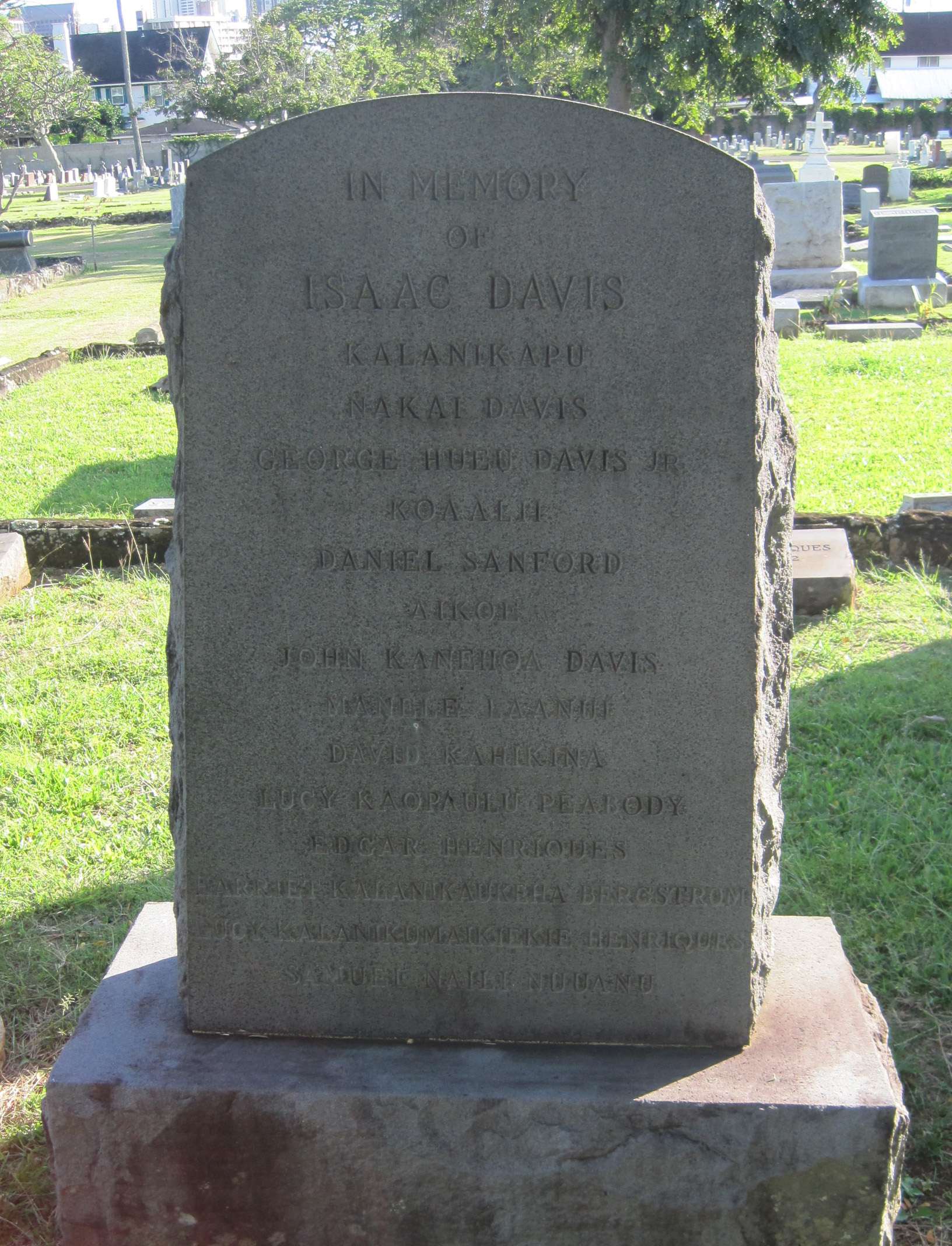
Memorial to Isaac Davis and his descendants, Oahu Cemetery

When King Kaumualiʻi agreed to cede Kauaʻi to Kamehameha and become a vassal ruler, the chiefs became angry. A plan was made to kill Kaumualiʻi, while he was on Oʻahu. During a council of the other chiefs, Kamehameha's high priest Kalaikuʻahulu helped persuade Kamehameha not to kill Kaumualiʻi.

However, the other chiefs secretly continued the plan to poison King Kaumualiʻi. Isaac Davis, learning of the plot, warned Kaumualiʻi. Not waiting to attend the feast which was planned in his honor, Kaumualiʻi slipped away and sailed for Kauaʻi. The poison which was probably intended for Kaumualiʻi was given to Isaac Davis, and he suddenly died in April 1810. He was buried in Honolulu, in "The Cemetery for Foreigners". On his tombstone was placed the inscription:

The remains of
Isaac Davis
who died on this Island
April, 1810
Aged 52 years

This cemetery is located near the Hawaii State Library in Honolulu.

Isaac Davis had been one of Kamehameha's closest friends and advisors. His death was a great shock to Kamehameha and cast a dark shadow over the satisfaction which the King must have felt with the peaceful settlement with the king of Kauaʻi.

== Family ==
His nephew John Davis came to Hawaii in 1810 trying to find his uncle. John stayed and married a Hawaiian noble woman named Kauweʻa kanoaʻakaka wale no haleakala kaʻuwe kekiniʻokoolau (Daughter of Chief Kaukamoa and Chiefess Nahulanui). They had a son named Charles Kapuainahulu Davis who married Hannah Kuloloia Davis (maiden Kupaka 1826–1936), and had issue Tammer Keopualani Davis (Born 1856). John and "Kauwe" also had a daughter named Eliza Davis (1821–1912) who had daughters Hannah (1855–1938) and Mary with husband William Johnson (?–1863). Eliza later married William Roy (?–1905). Hannah Johnson married a son of missionary John Davis Paris (1809–1892), and Mary married a Hilo businessman William Herbert Shipman (1854–1943).

== Family tree ==
Isaac Davis (Hawaii) family tree

King Kaumualiʻi of Kauaʻi (1778–1824) | Kualukuna (1778-?) | Isaac Davis ʻAikake (1758–1810) | Nakaiakalimaalualu | Young family
Kanekuapuu | Sarah Kaniaulono Davis (1797-1867) | Captain Alexander Adams (1780–1871) | James Kānehoa (1797–1851)
Humehume; George P. Kaumualiʻi (1798–1825) | Betty Peke Davis (1803–1848) | Antone Sylva (1807-1887)
Isaac Keʻeaumoku Adams (1817-1900) | Keliiopunui (1830-bef.1900)
Harriet Kawahinekipi (1823–1843) | John Meek Jr. (1821-1848)
Alexander Adams (1846-?) | Keliʻimaikaʻi "Alebada" Kaʻeo (?-1851)
Kahaanapilo Papa | George Hueu Davis (1808-1873)
House of Kamehameha
Sarah Kahoiwai Davis (1838-?) | Elizabeth Kamakaila Davis | William Kulua Davis Sr. (1824-1871) | George Davis Jr. (1825-1896) | Amelia Nakai Kanekuapuu (1827-1895)
Ruth Keʻelikōlani (1826-1883) | Isaac Young Davis (1824-1882) | Louisa Kolohu Spencer | John Young ʻOlohana Davis (1830-?) | Hana Kailihiwa | William Kahiukahi Davis (1860-?)
Keolaokalani Davis Pākī (1862-1863) | Elizabeth Kahaanapilo Davis (1857-?) | Isaac Kahaulelio Davis (1849-?) | William Kulua Davis Jr.
