= Robert Auld =

Robert Auld may refer to:

- Bertie Auld (1938–2021), Scottish football player
- Robert Auld (British Army officer) (1848–1911), lieutenant-governor of Guernsey from 1908 to 1911
