= Gabriel Basso =

American actor

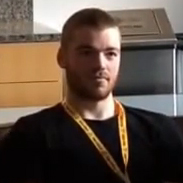
- Basso in 2015
- Born: Louis Gabriel Basso III; December 11, 1994 (age 31); St. Louis, Missouri, U.S.
- Occupation: Actor
- Years active: 2006–present
- Relatives: Annalise Basso (sister)

Louis Gabriel Basso III (born December 11, 1994) is an American actor. Beginning his career as a child actor, Basso had roles in films such as Super 8 (2011), The Kings of Summer (2013), Barely Lethal (2015), The Whole Truth (2016), Hillbilly Elegy (2020), and A House of Dynamite (2025). He is best known for his lead roles as Adam Jamison on the Showtime comedy drama series The Big C (2010–13) and FBI Agent Peter Sutherland on the Netflix action thriller series The Night Agent (2023–present).

== Early life ==
Basso was born in St. Louis, Missouri, the son of Marcie and Louis J. Basso. He was home-schooled along with his two sisters, actresses Alexandria and Annalise Basso. His family attended Grace Doctrine Church in St. Charles, Missouri. Basso wanted to become a professional football player before he found acting.

== Career ==
Basso played minor roles in two feature films in early 2007 while living in St. Louis: Meet Bill, starring Aaron Eckhart; and Alice Upside Down, starring Alyson Stoner. Basso's older sister Alexandria also had a role in the latter. He later moved with his mother and sisters to Los Angeles. He found representation his first week there, securing a lead role in the Dailymotion Kids web series Ghost Town.

Basso has had several television guest roles in popular series such as Nickelodeon's iCarly, and ABC's The Middle. From 2010 until 2013, he maintained a regular role in the Showtime comedy series The Big C, portraying Adam Jamison, the son of the lead character played by Laura Linney. He then starred as Hal Mitchell in the independent film Alabama Moon (2009), starring John Goodman and Clint Howard, directed by Tim McCanlies, and based on the best-selling novel by Watt Key.

Basso appeared in the J. J. Abrams science fiction adventure film Super 8 (2011), and Jordan Vogt-Roberts' comedy-drama The Kings of Summer (2013), which had its premiere at the 2013 Sundance Film Festival. He then appeared in Kyle Newman's action comedy Barely Lethal (2015), with Hailee Steinfeld and Dove Cameron. In September 2014 he joined the cast of Meg Ryan's directorial debut film Ithaca, alongside Tom Hanks. Basso also appeared in the courtroom drama film The Whole Truth (2016), directed by Courtney Hunt and starring Keanu Reeves and Renée Zellweger. In 2020, he starred as JD Vance in Netflix's film adaptation Hillbilly Elegy.

In September 2021 Basso was added to the cast of Netflix's action-thriller film Trigger Warning directed by Mouly Surya. In November 2021, he was set to lead the political conspiracy thriller series The Night Agent with Luciane Buchanan on Netflix, created by Shawn Ryan and based on the 2019 New York Times bestselling novel of the same name by author Matthew Quirk. In 2022 he joined the cast of Renny Harlin's The Strangers Trilogy.

In November 2025, Basso began work on his directorial debut Iconoclast for Netflix.

== Filmography ==
=== Film ===
| Year | Title | Role | Notes |
|---|---|---|---|
| 2007 | Meet Bill | Kid with Cancer | Uncredited |
| 2007 | Alice Upside Down | Classmate / Theater Club Member | Uncredited |
| 2009 | Alabama Moon | Hal Mitchell | |
| 2011 | Super 8 | Martin Read | |
| 2013 | The Kings of Summer | Patrick Keenan | |
| 2014 | The Hive | Adam Goldstein | |
| 2015 | Barely Lethal | Gooch | |
| 2015 | Ithaca | Tobey George | |
| 2015 | Anatomy of the Tide | Kyle Waterman | |
| 2016 | American Wrestler: The Wizard | Jimmy Petersen | |
| 2016 | The Whole Truth | Mike Lassiter | |
| 2020 | Hillbilly Elegy | JD Vance | |
| 2024 | The Strangers: Chapter 1 | Gregory Rotter | |
| 2024 | Trigger Warning | Mike | |
| 2024 | Juror #2 | James Michael Sythe | |
| 2025 | A House of Dynamite | Deputy National Security Advisor Jake Baerington | |
| 2025 | The Strangers – Chapter 2 | Gregory Rotter | |
| 2026 | The Strangers – Chapter 3 | Gregory Rotter / "Scarecrow" | |
| 2026 | Iconoclast | Connor | Also director, writer and producer |
| 2026 | Love of Your Life | Charlie | |

=== Television ===
| Year | Title | Role | Notes |
|---|---|---|---|
| 2009 | iCarly | Fake Freddie | Episode: "iLook Alike" |
| 2009 | Eastwick | Elliot | Episode: "Magic Snow and Creepy Gene" |
| 2010 | The Middle | Rodney Glossner | Episode: "The Neighbor" |
| 2010 | Scared Shrekless | Teenager No. 1 (voice) | Television short |
| 2010–2013 | The Big C | Adam Jamison | 40 episodes |
| 2011 | R. L. Stine's The Haunting Hour: The Series | Teddy | Episode: "Lights Out" |
| 2012 | Perception | Billy Mitchell | Episode: "Kilimanjaro" |
| 2014 | The Red Road | Brian Rogers | Episode: "Snaring of the Sun" |
| 2023–present | The Night Agent | Peter Sutherland | Lead role; also producer |
