= Callum Vinson =

American child actor

- Occupation: Actor
- Years active: 2021–present

Callum Vinson is an American child actor best known for his roles in Chucky (2023–2024) as Henry Collins, Long Bright River (2025) as Thomas Fitzpatrick and The Night Agent (2026) as The Son.

== Career ==
Vinson began his acting career in the early 2020s, appearing in guest and recurring roles on television. In 2023, he gained attention for his recurring role as Henry Collins in the Syfy and USA Network series Chucky.

In 2025, Vinson portrays Thomas Fitzpatrick, son of the main character, in the Peacock limited series Long Bright River, based on the novel by Liz Moore. He has a supporting but pivotal role in the third season of the Netflix thriller series The Night Agent, released in 2026. He plays a young version of Jason Voorhees in Crystal Lake, a Peacock television series released in 2026 as a prequel to the Friday the 13th franchise. He is set to portray Atreus, the son of Kratos, in the upcoming Amazon Prime Video live-action adaptation of the two Norse mythology-based video games of the God of War series.

== Filmography ==
=== Television ===
Year	Title	Role	Notes
2023–2024	Chucky	Henry Collins	7 episodes
2025	Long Bright River	Thomas Fitzpatrick	8 episodes
2025	Poker Face	Elijah Turner	Episode: "Sloppy Joseph"
2026	The Night Agent	The Son	Main role (season 3)
2026	Crystal Lake	Young Jason Voorhees	4 episodes
TBA	God of War †	Atreus	Main role
