= Matthew Quirk =

American journalist and novelist

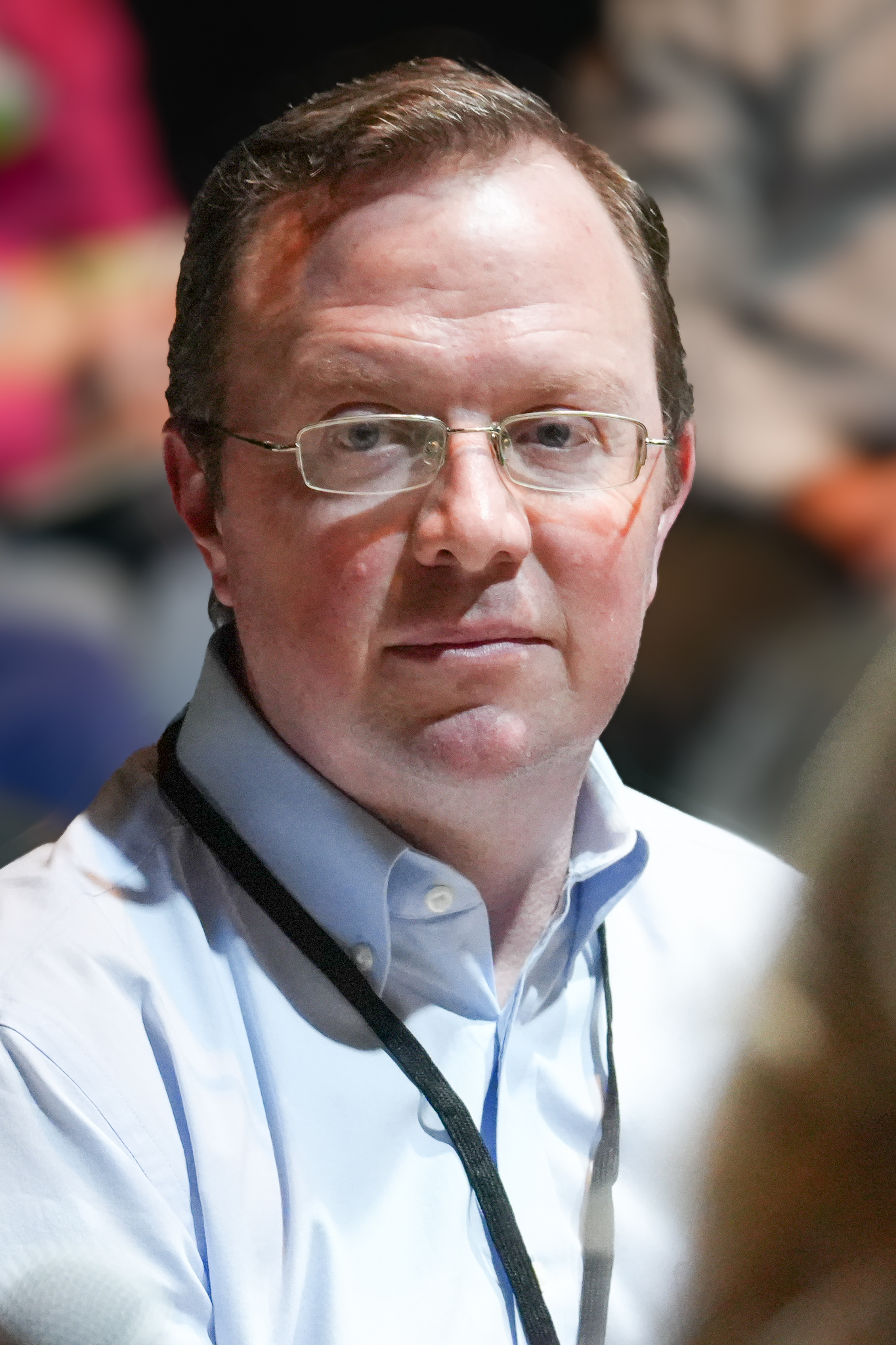
- Matthew Quirk at the 2026 San Diego Writers Festival
- Born: 1980 (age 45–46)
- Education: Harvard College
- Occupations: Writer, Novelist, Journalist
- Writing career
- Period: 2012–present
- Genre: Thrillers
- Notable work: The Night Agent
- Website: matthewquirk.com

Matthew Quirk is a New York Times bestselling American novelist and journalist who is best known for his book The Night Agent, a political conspiracy thriller, which was adapted into a Netflix show by Shawn Ryan. Prior to being a novelist, he worked as a reporter for The Atlantic, discussing crime and terrorism. He currently lives in San Diego, California.

== Career ==
Matthew worked as a journalist for The Atlantic. He also wrote for The Wall Street Journal and The Washington Post.

== Background ==
Quirk studied history and literature at Harvard University.

== Works ==
=== Mike Ford Series ===
- The 500 (2012)
- The Directive (2014)

=== John Hayes Series ===
- Cold Barrel Zero (2016)
- Dead Man Switch (2017)

=== Standalone Books ===
- The Night Agent (2019)
- Hour of the Assassin (2020)
- Red Warning (2022)
- Inside Threat (2023)
- The Method (2026)

== Adaptations ==
- The Night Agent (2023 TV series), starring Gabriel Basso, Luciane Buchanan, and Hong Chau.

== Awards ==
Matthew was nominated for an Edgar Award for Best First Novel by an American Author in 2012 for The 500.

== Bibliography ==
1. Inside Threat: A Novel (2023) ASIN B0BFX1VCDN
2. Red Warning (2022) ASIN B09FLRYMCP
3. Hour of the Assassin: A Novel (2020) ASIN B07TS3GFFQ
4. The Night Agent (2019) ASIN B07B7LB9TN
5. Dead Man Switch (John Hayes Series Book 2) (2017) ASIN B01HZFB420
6. Cold Barrel Zero (John Hayes Series Book 1) (2016) ASIN B0112T4YMC
7. The Directive: A Novel (Mike Ford Book 2) (2014) ASIN B00EXTQRLK
8. The 500: A Novel (Mike Ford Book 1) (2012) ASIN B005SCRX2S
