= Alabama Moon (film) =

- Film poster
- Directed by: Tim McCanlies
- Screenplay by: Watt Key; James Whittaker
- Based on: Alabama Moon by Watt Key
- Produced by: Lee Faulkner; Kenny McLean; Faulkner-McLean Entertainment
- Starring: Jimmy Bennett; John Goodman; Gabriel Basso; Uriah Shelton; Clint Howard
- Cinematography: Jimmy Lindsey
- Edited by: Mark Coffey
- Music by: Ludek Drizhal
- Distributed by: Myriad Pictures (international)
- Release date: September 27, 2009
- Running time: 98 minutes
- Country: United States
- Language: English
- Box office: $47,305

Alabama Moon is a 2009 American coming-of-age film directed by Tim McCanlies and starring Jimmy Bennett and John Goodman, based on the book Alabama Moon by Watt Key. The story takes place in the forests of Alabama.

== Cast ==
- Jimmy Bennett as Moon Blake
- John Goodman as Mr. Wellington
- Uriah Shelton as Kit
- Gabriel Basso as Hal Mitchell
- Clint Howard as Constable Davy Sanders
- J. D. Evermore as Oliver Blake
- Elizabeth Jackson as Rachael Gene
- Michael P. Sullivan as Mr. Gene
- Walter Breaux as Mr. Carter
- Gary Grubbs as Judge Mackin
- John McConnell as Mr. Mitchell
- Peter Gabb as Mr. Albroscotto
- Mark Adam Miller as Mike Blake
- Colin Ford as Moon Blake (voice narrator)

== Accolades ==
The film was awarded the Dove Foundation Family Approved seal in 2010.
