= The God of the Woods =

2024 novel by Liz Moore

- Author: Liz Moore
- Language: English
- Publisher: Riverhead Books
- Publication date: July 2, 2024
- Publication place: United States
- Pages: 496
- ISBN: 9780593915370

The God of the Woods is a novel by Liz Moore published in 2024.

== Plot summary ==
The wealthy Van Laar family sponsor a wilderness summer camp on their remote property in the Adirondack Mountains. The camp is operated by the Hewitts, their longtime employees. Fourteen years ago, their son Bear disappeared in the forest under mysterious circumstances.

Newcomer Tracy Jewell makes friends at camp with the Van Laars' neglected thirteen-year-old daughter Barbara, who demonstrates her impressive survival skills.

The girls' counselor Louise has a fight with her abusive boyfriend John Paul, a family friend of the Van Laars. The next morning, she discovers that Barbara has gone missing.

Police investigator Judyta Luptack interviews the Van Laars, who are uncooperative, alongside their guests and employees. She learns that John Paul was seen fleeing the property on the night of the disappearance. When apprehended, a bag of Barbara's bloody clothing is found in his car, but he lies that it was given to him by Louise.

Luptack learns from campers—including Tracy—of Barbara's secret nighttime visits to T.J. Hewitt, the camp's director. T.J. denies any wrongdoing, and when Luptack releases her, she disappears alongside her infirm father Vic.

The serial killer Jacob Sluiter is apprehended nearby after escaping from prison. He claims not to have harmed either Van Laar child, but leads Luptack to Bear's grave. Luptack realizes Vic Hewitt, who led the search for Bear, must have misdirected search parties away from the burial site.

Luptack discovers the Hewitts hiding on the property and confronts them. T.J. describes the events of Bear's death: his mother Alice, intoxicated and humiliated by her husband, took Bear out on the lake during a thunderstorm, where he drowned. To avoid a scandal, the Van Laars asked Vic Hewitt to hide his body, but the act was witnessed by both T.J. and Sluiter.

With the Hewitts' cooperation, Luptack determines the fate of Barbara Van Laar: after secretly learning survival skills from T.J., she ran away to live in the wilderness. The pair framed John Paul for the crime, using blood from a camping accident, because T.J. once witnessed his abuse of Louise. T.J. will raise Barbara at the Hewitts' remote cabin until she is an adult.

Luptack travels to the cabin and finds Barbara, but agrees to leave her alone.

== Reception ==
The book sold well, appearing on The New York Times Best Seller List for 38 weeks as of April 2025. The New York Times named it one of the best crime novels of the year. Its book review described it as "more than just a mystery about children lost in the woods. It concerns the relationships between parents and children and haves and have-nots." The reviewer described the depiction of a character's anguish over the loss of a child as "acutely, painfully real."

The California Review of Books opined that "It’s no surprise that Liz Moore's The God of the Woods is a bestseller in the thriller and suspense and — not as obvious to me — literary fiction categories. Thousands of readers are eagerly turning its pages. I was among them, anxious to learn what is going to happen next. The inventiveness of the multiple stories and the effective structuring of past and present explain the novel’s sales success and appeal to readers."

The New Yorker called it an "expertly paced thriller" that "plays dexterously with the tension between the wealthy and the working class they employ."

The Washington Post characterized it as "Intricate ... Transports readers so deeply into its richly peopled, ominous world that, for hours, everything else falls away ... Chillingly astute about the invisible boundaries demarcating social class."

Kirkus Reviews commented: "As rich in background detail and secondary mysteries as it is, this ever-expansive, intricate, emotionally engaging novel never seems overplotted. Every piece falls skillfully into place and every character, major and minor, leaves an imprint."

== Television adaptation ==
In July 2024, it was reported that Sony Pictures Television had acquired Liz Moore's novel for the series adaptation. In December 2025, Netflix greenlighted the series which was to be written and produced by Moore and Liz Hannah. In the spring of 2026, it was announced that Maya Hawke had been cast as Judy Luptack, while Kerry Condon was to play Alice Van Laar. Production began on June 12, 2026.
