= God of War (American TV series) =

Upcoming television series

- Genre: Action-adventure; Fantasy drama
- Based on: God of War by Santa Monica Studio
- Showrunner: Ronald D. Moore
- Starring: Dave Bautista; Callum Vinson; Teresa Palmer; Max Parker; Ólafur Darri Ólafsson; Mandy Patinkin; Ed Skrein; Louis Cunningham; Island Austin
- Country of origin: United States
- Original language: English

Production
- Executive producers: Ronald D. Moore; Maril Davis; Cory Barlog; Naren Shankar; Matthew Graham; Asad Qizilbash; Jeff Ketcham; Hermen Hulst; Roy Lee; Brad Van Arragon
- Production companies: Sony Pictures Television; Amazon MGM Studios; PlayStation Productions; Tall Ship Productions

Original release
- Network: Amazon Prime Video

God of War is an upcoming American fantasy drama television series created for Amazon Prime Video. Based on the Norse mythology era of the video game franchise developed by Santa Monica Studio, the series follows father and son Kratos (Dave Bautista) and Atreus (Callum Vinson) as they embark on a journey to spread the ashes of their wife and mother, Faye, at the highest peak of the nine realms.

Development by Sony Pictures Television, Amazon MGM Studios, and PlayStation Productions began in March 2022 with two seasons ordered. The series entered back-to-back production of two seasons from February 2026 to October 2027, with Ronald D. Moore as showrunner. Ryan Hurst was originally cast as Kratos, but after an injury incurred while filming in late June 2026, Bautista was recast in the role.

== Cast and characters ==
=== Main ===
- Dave Bautista as Kratos
- Callum Vinson as Atreus (season 1)
- Teresa Palmer as Sif
- Max Parker as Heimdall
- Ólafur Darri Ólafsson as Thor
- Mandy Patinkin as Odin
- Ed Skrein as Baldur
- Louis Cunningham as Modi
- Island Austin as Thrud (season 1)

=== Recurring ===
- Alastair Duncan as Mimir
- Danny Woodburn as Brok
- Jeff Gulka as Sindri
- Ben Chapple as Magni
- Evelyn Miller as Gna
- Sonya Walger as Freya

== Production ==
=== Development ===
Following the success of Santa Monica Studio's original God of War (2005) video game based on Greek mythology, a live-action film adaptation was announced. The film remained in a prolonged pre-production state which saw director, writer, and script changes. After the release of the 2018 installment, which shifted the game series to Norse mythology, and with no updates on the original game's film, rumors of a film adaptation of the newer installment began circulating, but in May 2021, a Sony spokesperson confirmed that there was no film adaptation in development. However, the following year in March 2022, Deadline Hollywood reported that instead of a film, a live-action television adaptation of the God of War series was in negotiations with Amazon Prime Video by Mark Fergus, Hawk Ostby, and Rafe Judkins.

During an investor briefing in May 2022, Sony Interactive Entertainment president Jim Ryan officially confirmed the series was in development. The series was officially ordered that December, produced by Sony Pictures Television and Amazon Studios in association with PlayStation Productions. Executive producers confirmed were Santa Monica Studio's Cory Barlog and Yumi Yang, PlayStation Productions's Asad Qizilbash and Carter Swan, and Vertigo Entertainment's Roy Lee, with Santa Monica's Jeff Ketcham serving as a co-executive producer. It was confirmed that the series would adapt the two Norse mythology–based games—2018's God of War and its 2022 sequel God of War Ragnarök.

Amazon Studios's Head of Television, Vernon Sanders, assured that the series would stay true to the games. Sanders said that the "emotional core" of the first season, and series as a whole, would be the father-and-son story. Qizilbash claimed that they would apply the same amount of care that they did with the television adaptation of The Last of Us, stating that they would be telling the whole story of the game, as without the time constraints of a film, they would have multiple episodes to be able to tell the story.

The series was originally being written by Fergus and Ostby, with Judkins serving as showrunner and all three as executive producers. By January 2024, writing was underway. In October, however, it was reported that while multiple scripts for the first season had been completed and although both Sony and Prime gave praise, the trio of Fergus, Ostby, and Judkins left the project as the studios wanted to start over and go in a different direction. That same month, Ronald D. Moore was then hired as the series writer, showrunner, and as an executive producer, with his own company, Tall Ship Productions, also producing. Sony Interactive Entertainment's Hermen Hulst was named executive producer, replacing Yang. In March 2025, Moore revealed that Amazon had ordered two seasons of the series. Pre-production started that December in Vancouver with casting underway, along with Frederick E. O. Toye hired as director of the first two episodes, and Maril Davis, Naren Shankar, Matthew Graham, and Brad Van Arragon named as executive producers, followed by Ketcham in January, replacing Swan. Other directors include Lawrence Trilling, Loni Peristere, Shana Stein, and Karen Gaviola.

=== Casting ===
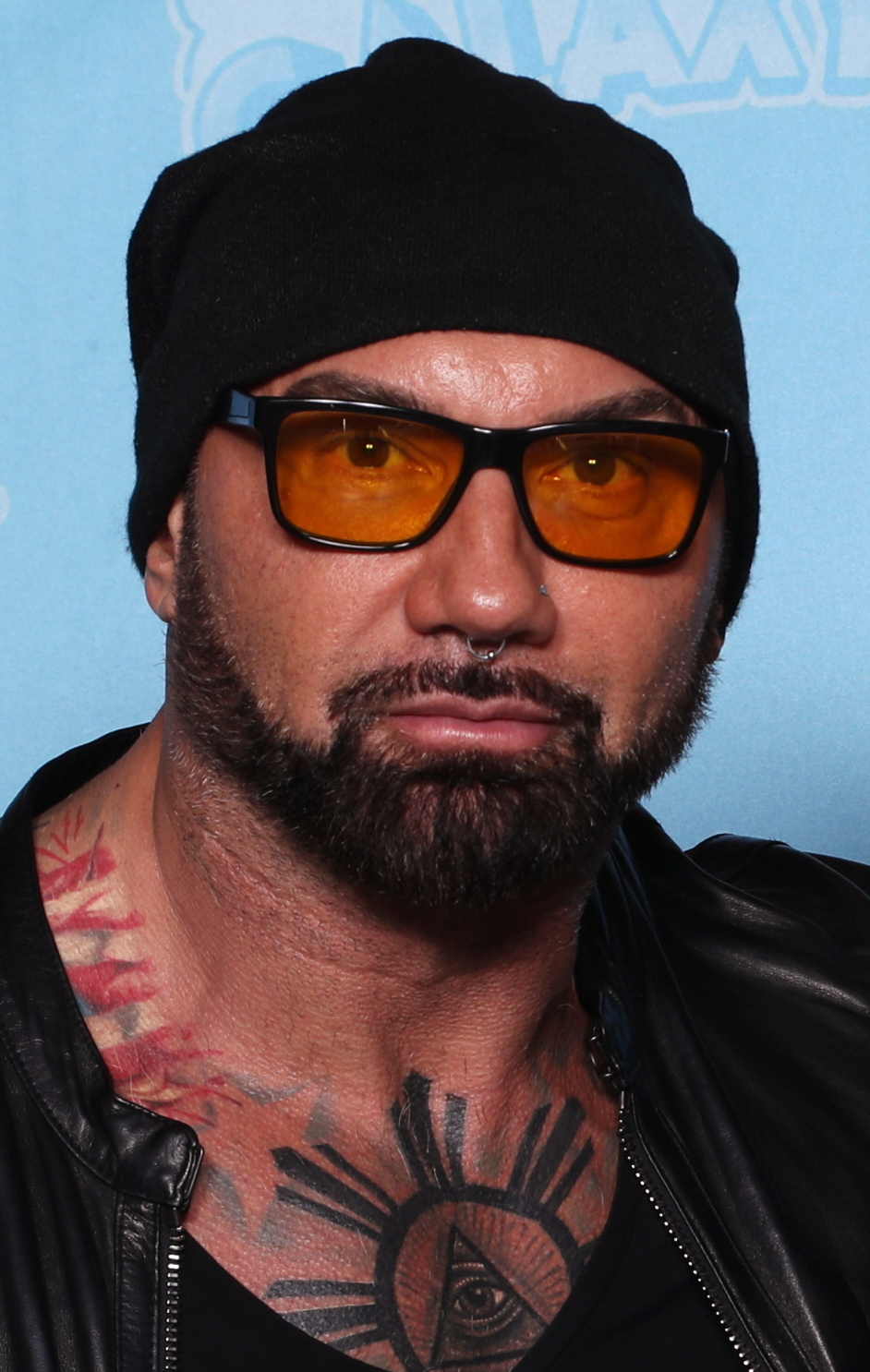
Dave Bautista (left) was cast as Kratos, replacing Ryan Hurst (right) after he was injured during filming.

In January 2026, it was announced that Ryan Hurst had been cast in the lead role of Kratos; Hurst previously provided the voice and motion capture for Thor in Ragnarök. More casting announcements continued that same month, with Teresa Palmer, Max Parker, Ólafur Darri Ólafsson, Mandy Patinkin, Danny Woodburn, and Jeff Gulka cast as Sif, Heimdall, Thor, Odin, Brok, and Sindri, respectively, along with Alastair Duncan reprising his role as Mímir from the games. In February, Callum Vinson and Ed Skrein were cast as Atreus and Baldur, respectively. The next month, Louis Cunningham, Ben Chapple, Evelyn Miller, Island Austin, and Sonya Walger joined the cast as Modi, Magni, Gna, Thrud, and Freya, respectively.

In July 2026, Deadline Hollywood reported that the studios made the decision to recast Kratos as a result of Hurst tearing his biceps while filming a stunt in late June. The injury required surgery, with Hurst's estimated recovery time going beyond the allotted shooting schedule. Hurst had physically prepared for the role, putting on forty pounds of muscle to portray Kratos. In August, it was reported that the roles of Atreus and Thrud would be recast for the second season as Vinson and Austin would not be old enough to fill the respective roles in the second season due to the three-year time jump that occurs between the games. Around the same time, it was reported that Dave Bautista was in talks to play Kratos, with his casting confirmed on August 20.

Christopher Judge, who portrayed Kratos in the Norse-based games and has previous live-action experience, said that he had been in talks to reprise Kratos for the live-action series during the early days of the project. He said he had begun to physically prepare and had even read for it, but had trouble memorizing the lines. Citing his age of 62, he decided to decline the role due to the toll it would take on his body with having to diet and work out every day. He was supportive of Hurst, calling him the perfect choice as he was a gamer who had played all the games in addition to his previous role as Thor in Ragnarök, and he also gave his support to Bautista, though was concerned over Bautista's health as he had slimmed down and would have to bulk back up.

=== Filming ===
Principal photography, under the working title Anaheim Realm, began on February 25, 2026, in Vancouver, and was originally expected to wrap on April 1, 2027. It was reported that the plan was to shoot both seasons back-to-back. As a result of Hurst's injury in late June, filming was paused from July 1 until the role of Kratos was recast. The studios began prepping again in August, and production resumed on October 26. By the time production was paused, four episodes had been filmed, which are expected to be completely reshot to account for the aging of Vinson. Following the hiatus, filming is set to wrap on October 31, 2027.

== Release ==
God of War is scheduled to premiere on Amazon Prime Video in more than 240 countries and territories worldwide.
