= Long Bright River (TV series) =

American television series

- Genre: Crime drama
- Created by: Nikki Toscano; Liz Moore
- Based on: Long Bright River by Liz Moore
- Starring: Amanda Seyfried; Nicholas Pinnock; Ashleigh Cummings; Callum Vinson; John Doman
- Country of origin: United States
- Original language: English
- No. of episodes: 8

Production
- Executive producers: Liz Moore; Nikki Toscano; Amy Pascal; Neal H. Moritz; Pavun Shetty; Hagar Ben-Asher; Russell Rothberg; Amanda Lewis; Amanda Seyfried
- Producer: Jerry Kupfer
- Production companies: Original Film; Pascal Pictures; Black Mass Productions; Universal Content Productions; Sony Pictures Television

Original release
- Network: Peacock
- Release: March 13, 2025

Long Bright River is an American crime drama miniseries based on the 2020 book of the same name by Liz Moore. The miniseries stars Amanda Seyfried as a Philadelphia police officer. The miniseries also stars Nicholas Pinnock, Ashleigh Cummings, Callum Vinson, and John Doman. It aired on Peacock on March 13, 2025.

For her performance, Seyfried earned a Golden Globe Award nomination for Best Actress in a Limited or Anthology Series or Television Film.

== Premise ==
A patrol officer Mickey (Amanda Seyfried) working in Kensington, a struggling, high-crime neighborhood of Philadelphia, Pennsylvania, investigates the murders of three local women while seeking information about her own sister Kacey's (Ashleigh Cummings) disappearance.

== Cast ==
=== Main ===
- Amanda Seyfried as Mickey Fitzpatrick, a veteran Philadelphia patrolwoman looking for her missing sister
- Nicholas Pinnock as Truman Dawes, Mickey's former patrol partner
- Ashleigh Cummings as Kacey Fitzpatrick, Mickey's missing sister
- Callum Vinson as Thomas Fitzpatrick, Mickey's son
- John Doman as Gee, Mickey's grandfather

=== Recurring ===
- Dash Mihok as Eddie Lafferty
- Britne Oldford as Dr. Aura Williams
- Matthew Del Negro as Simon Cleare, Mickey's ex-husband and Thomas's father
- Harriet Sansom Harris as Mrs. Mahon
- Patch Darragh as Sergeant Ahearn
- Joe Daru as Davis Danjarat
- Perry Mattfeld as Paula

== Episodes ==
No.	Title	Directed by	Written by	Original release date
1	"These Girls"	Hagar Ben-Asher	Nikki Toscano & Liz Moore	March 13, 2025
2	"Let Me In"	Gwyneth Horder-Payton	Nikki Toscano & Liz Moore	March 13, 2025
3	"Mother Wolf"	Gwyneth Horder-Payton	Nikki Toscano & Liz Moore	March 13, 2025
4	"Blind Spot"	Mona Fastvold	Russell Rothberg	March 13, 2025
5	"Where Do You Go?"	Hagar Ben-Asher	Alexandra McNally	March 13, 2025
6	"Hereditary"	Nikki Toscano	Nikki Toscano & Tricia V. Johnson	March 13, 2025
7	"Wrong Devil, Wrong Deal"	Jessica Yu	Liz Moore & Alye Capone	March 13, 2025
8	"Atonement"	Meera Menon	Nikki Toscano & Liz Moore	March 13, 2025

== Production ==
A television adaptation of the Liz Moore novel Long Bright River for Peacock was announced in January 2024 with Nikki Toscano as show runner with Amanda Seyfried in the lead role. The series is written by Moore and Toscano, who are also executive producers. Production comes from Sony Pictures Television and UCP, a division of Universal Studio Group. Neal H. Moritz, Pavun Shetty and Amanda Lewis will executive produce for Original Film and Amy Pascal will executive produce for Pascal Pictures. Hagar Ben-Asher is directing and executive producer on the opening episode. In February 2024, Nicholas Pinnock was cast as Truman Dawes. That same month, Ashleigh Cummings, Callum Vinson, and John Doman joined the cast. In March 2024, Dash Mihok, Britne Oldford, Matthew Del Negro and Harriet Sansom Harris joined the cast in recurring roles.

In preparation for the role, Amanda Seyfried took part in a ride-along with Philadelphia police officers in January 2024. Filming took place in New York in March 2024.

== Release ==
The series premiered on Peacock, Crave and USA Network Canada with all eight episodes on March 13, 2025. It was broadcast in the UK on Channel 4 from 17 May 2025.

== Reception ==
On review aggregator Rotten Tomatoes, Long Bright River has an approval rating of 73% based on 22 critics' reviews, with an average rating of 7.3 out of 10. The website's critics consensus reads, "Carried along by Amanda Seyfried's steely turn as a closed-off cop, Long Bright River takes a winding path with some unnecessary detours but ultimately arrives at a compelling destination." Metacritic calculated a weighted average of 66 out of 100 based on 14 reviews, indicating "generally favorable" reviews.

The series is set in Kensington, a Philadelphia neighborhood frequently associated with crime, prostitution and an open-air drug market. In a review for NPR's Fresh Air, John Powers notes that the series "depicts the characters living in an area of Philly whose decline embodies a profound social collapse ... Propelled by its heroine's search for a killer, Long Bright River isn't just a mystery but a heartfelt story about wounded communities, wounded families and the wounded individuals who try to make things better."

Seyfried's performance in the role was met with critical acclaim, receiving a Golden Globe Award nomination for Best Actress in a Limited or Anthology Series or Television Film. She also earned nominations for Best Actress in a Limited Series or TV Movie at the 5th Astra TV Awards and Best Actress in a Miniseries, Limited Series, or Motion Picture Made for Television at the 30th Satellite Awards.

== See also ==
- List of Peacock original programming
