= The Whole Truth (2016 film) =

- Theatrical release poster
- Directed by: Courtney Hunt
- Written by: Nicholas Kazan
- Produced by: Anthony Bregman; Elon Dershowitz; Kevin Frakes; Raj Brinder Singh
- Starring: Keanu Reeves; Renée Zellweger; Gugu Mbatha-Raw; Gabriel Basso; Jim Belushi
- Cinematography: Jules O'Loughlin
- Edited by: Kate Williams
- Music by: Evgueni Galperine; Sacha Galperine
- Production companies: FilmNation Entertainment; PalmStar Entertainment; Likely Story; Merced Media
- Distributed by: Lionsgate Premiere
- Release date: October 21, 2016
- Running time: 93 minutes
- Country: United States
- Language: English
- Budget: $7.9 million
- Box office: $1.7 million

The Whole Truth is a 2016 American legal thriller film directed by Courtney Hunt and written by Nicholas Kazan. The film stars Keanu Reeves, Gabriel Basso, Gugu Mbatha-Raw, Renée Zellweger, and Jim Belushi. The film follows a defense attorney taking a case involving a teenager accused of killing his father. The Whole Truth was released in the United States on October 21, 2016, by Lionsgate Premiere. The film grossed $1.7 million against a production budget of $7.9 million.

== Plot ==
Defense attorney Richard Ramsay works the case of 17-year-old Mike Lassiter's alleged murder of his wealthy lawyer father Boone, a professional friend. Ramsay feels pressure to save Mike, but Mike's complete silence makes it difficult. Ramsay employs young, talented lawyer Janelle Brady, daughter of another professional friend, as his associate after she leaves a career in corporate law.

The first witness, a flight attendant for a charter flight, states that she witnessed tension between father and son on a return journey from Stanford. In a flashback, Mike wants to go to Reed College, but Boone forces him to attend Stanford University. The police officer who first responded to the call testifies that at the scene of the crime, Mike muttered "I should've done it long ago", and she and the chief detective affirm that his fingerprints were found on the murder weapon.

The Lassiters' neighbors testify that Mike was very close to Boone when he was young but gradually grew distant in his teens and also report Boone's arrogant attitude towards his family and neighbors. Flashbacks show Boone's various affairs and his bossy and belittling behavior towards his wife, Loretta, both in public and private. Loretta testifies she endured emotional and physical abuse for years, including the day of his death. She testifies that she went to take a shower after the fight and when she came back, she found his corpse. She tearfully says that Mike admitted to her that he did it. Ramsay provides pictures of her bruised body, taken a day after Boone's death, as evidence of his cruelty.

Mike finally decides to talk and demands to take the stand over Ramsay's objections. He corroborates his mother's and neighbors' version about his father's arrogance and cruelty, and suddenly admits to killing his father, not to save his mother but to save himself as he was raped by his father since he was 12 years old. Mike says the abuse resumed on their flight back from Stanford, and he killed Boone when he again tried it on the day of his death.

The prosecution calls the flight attendant, who first insists that nothing happened on the flight. Under questioning by Janelle, the attendant admits to covering up her extramarital affair with the co-pilot and potentially spending too much time in the cockpit to confidently deny any unusual interactions between father and son. Janelle later becomes suspicious about Mike's story, meets Loretta outside the courtroom, and gradually deduces that Mike is protecting Loretta. She confronts Ramsay, who says that his duty is to save Mike, not to find the truth. She angrily leaves, making Ramsay worry about the jury's reaction to her absence, but he continues with the case.

Despite the lack of proper evidence of Boone's abuse, the jury acquits Mike. While waiting for his belongings in a private room, Mike confronts Ramsay, saying that he saw his mother covertly remove Ramsay's watch from beside his father's corpse. Mike says that he took the blame in order to save his mother but that he will not protect Ramsay. Ramsay denies his involvement and tells him that the case will not stand and it only hurts Mike's credibility.

Mike disbelieves him but reluctantly drops it for the lack of evidence. As they all leave the court house, Ramsay recalls the true events. He and Loretta were having an affair. When Boone becomes suspicious about his wife's infidelity, Ramsay advises him to divorce her, but Boone implies he would kill her if she left him. Loretta and Ramsay conspire to kill him and present the case as self-defense on Loretta's part, but Mike comes home early. Before they can arrange the evidence, he confesses to the crime.

== Cast ==
- Keanu Reeves as Richard Ramsay, a defense attorney
- Renée Zellweger as Loretta Lassiter, Mike's mother
- Gugu Mbatha-Raw as Janelle Brady, a younger lawyer
- Gabriel Basso as Mike Lassiter, a seventeen-year-old suspected of murdering his father.
- Jim Belushi as Boone Lassiter, Mike's abusive father
- Jim Klock as Leblanc, the prosecutor
- Sean Bridgers as Arthur Westin, a former friend of Boone.
- Christopher Berry as Jack Lagrand
- Dana Gourrier as courthouse employee

== Production ==
Daniel Craig was originally set to star since January 2014. In April, just a few days before filming was set to commence, he dropped out of the project for unknown reasons. Craig was replaced by Keanu Reeves in June.

On April 1, 2014, Gabriel Basso was cast in the role of Mike. On July 10, Jim Belushi joined the cast of the film to play Mike's father, and Zellweger would play his mother. On August 12, Jim Klock was added to the cast to play the prosecutor, who has a supposedly rock-solid case against the teen.

=== Filming ===
Principal photography of the film began on July 7, 2014, in New Orleans, Louisiana. Previously the filming was slated to take place in Boston. Filming began on July 7, 2014 in St. Bernard Parish, Louisiana.

== Reception ==
On the review aggregator website Rotten Tomatoes, 34% of 32 critics' reviews are positive, with an average rating of 4.9/10. The website's consensus reads: "The Whole Truth, unfortunately, is that courtroom drama fans have already seen better examples of everything this lazy entry in the genre has to offer." Metacritic, which uses a weighted average, assigned the film a score of 46 out of 100, based on 15 critics, indicating "mixed or average" reviews.

Brian Tallerico of RogerEbert.com criticized the film for being "sterile and flat" and felt surprised that director Hunt was in charge of a "lackluster production" that follows the "Grisham playbook", concluding that: "Ultimately, there's nothing offensively bad here—other than a waste of talent who should be doing better work—but it's so forgettable that you'll have trouble remembering if you saw it or not when you scroll past it on cable in a few months." Variety's Peter Debruge was baffled by Hunt's second directorial effort having the same weaknesses of Frozen River ("a single-minded focus on a somewhat trashy predicament, with little to no room for subplots or other enriching details") but none of its strengths to elevate it from being "a weak legal procedural". Jeannette Catsoulis of The New York Times called it a "claustrophobic courtroom procedural" that's "drably photographed and generically framed" and tells a "soulless and poorly dramatized" plot that leaves its two main leads with little room to shine from a bare-bones script. Robert Abele of the Los Angeles Times was critical of the film's "general listlessness" and the "regrettably mannered acting" from the cast causing the story to lack tension. The A.V. Club's Noel Murray gave the movie an overall C+ grade, writing that "The Whole Truth is a moderately clever, reasonably entertaining courtroom drama, which is only a problem given the talent involved with bringing something this middle-of-the-road to the screen."
