= The Night Agent =

2023 American action thriller television series

- Genre: Action; Conspiracy thriller
- Created by: Shawn Ryan
- Based on: The Night Agent by Matthew Quirk
- Showrunner: Shawn Ryan
- Starring: Gabriel Basso; Luciane Buchanan; Fola Evans-Akingbola; Sarah Desjardins; Eve Harlow; Phoenix Raei; Enrique Murciano; D. B. Woodside; Hong Chau; Arienne Mandi; Louis Herthum; Berto Colon; Keon Alexander; Michael Malarkey; Amanda Warren; Ward Horton; Albert Jones; David Lyons; Jennifer Morrison; Stephen Moyer; Genesis Rodriguez; Callum Vinson
- Music by: Robert Duncan
- Country of origin: United States
- Original language: English
- No. of seasons: 3
- No. of episodes: 30

Production
- Executive producers: Shawn Ryan; Seth Gordon; Marney Hochman; Julia Gunn; James Vanderbilt; William Sherak; Paul Neinstein; Nicole Tossou; David Beaubaire; Munis Rashid; Paul Bernard; Guy Ferland; Seth Fisher
- Producers: James Dodson; Canella Williams-Larrabé; Alejandro Espinoza; Gabriel Basso
- Production locations: Vancouver; New York City
- Cinematography: David Hennings; François Dagenais; Michael Wale; Simon Chapman; Lula Carvalho; David Tuttman
- Editors: Peter Elliot; Lilly Urban; Natasha Gjurokovic; Anthony Pinker; C.J. Liao
- Running time: 45–56 minutes
- Production companies: MiddKid Productions; Exhibit A; Project X Entertainment; Sony Pictures Television (Note: Credited as Sony Pictures Television Studios for season 1)

Original release
- Network: Netflix
- Release: March 23, 2023 – present

The Night Agent is an American action thriller television series created by Shawn Ryan based on the novel of the same name by Matthew Quirk. Starring Gabriel Basso in the title role, it premiered on Netflix on March 23, 2023.

The series emerged as the third-most-viewed debuting series on Netflix in its first four days, and within a week it was renewed for a second season. Within a month, it became the streaming service's sixth-most-viewed series. In October 2024, ahead of the second-season premiere, the series was renewed for a third season. The second season was released on January 23, 2025. The third season premiered on February 19, 2026. In March 2026, the series was renewed for a fourth season, later confirmed to be its last.

== Plot ==
FBI agent Peter Sutherland is thrown into a vast conspiracy about a mole at the highest levels of the United States government. To save the nation, he plunges into a desperate hunt for the traitor, while protecting former tech CEO Rose Larkin from the people who murdered her aunt and uncle.

== Cast and characters ==
=== Main ===
- Gabriel Basso as Peter Sutherland, an FBI agent who works at the White House as a Night Action telephone operator in season 1 and becomes a Night Agent for Night Action end of season 1.
- Luciane Buchanan as Rose Larkin (seasons 1–2), a young cybersecurity entrepreneur and the niece of two Night Action agents. In the second season, she is working for a new tech startup called AdVerse.
- Fola Evans-Akingbola as Chelsea Arrington (seasons 1 and 3; guest season 2), an ambitious U.S. Secret Service agent initially assigned to Second Daughter Maddie Redfield, and later the campaign and presidential detail of Richard Hagan
- Sarah Desjardins as Maddie Redfield (season 1), the daughter of Vice President Ashley Redfield
- Eve Harlow as Ellen (season 1), an unpredictable assassin with a tragic and sad past
- Phoenix Raei as Dale (season 1), a professional hitman who is partnered with Ellen
- Enrique Murciano as Ben Almora (season 1), the director of the U.S. Secret Service
- D. B. Woodside as Erik Monks (season 1), a veteran U.S. Secret Service agent newly assigned to Maddie
- Hong Chau as Diane Farr (season 1), the White House chief of staff
- Arienne Mandi as Noor Taheri (season 2), a junior aide to the Iranian Mission at the United Nations in New York who is seeking asylum by cooperating with the FBI
- Louis Herthum as Jacob Monroe (season 2–3), a black market intelligence broker and former corporate lawyer
- Berto Colon as Solomon Vega (season 2), a Marine veteran who works for Jacob
- Keon Alexander as Javad (season 2), a Quds Force counterintelligence officer and the head of security at the Iranian Mission in New York
- Michael Malarkey as Markus Dargan (season 2), nephew of deposed terrorist dictator Viktor Bala
- Amanda Warren as Catherine Weaver (season 2–3), Peter's handler in Night Action
- Ward Horton as Richard Hagan (season 3; guest season 2), the Governor of Kansas and later President of the United States
- Albert Jones as Aiden Mosley (season 3; recurring season 2), the Deputy Director of the FBI and Night Action supervisor
- David Lyons as Adam Corrigan (season 3), a Night Agent with links to President Hagan, who is a former US Army Lieutenant and CIA contractor
- Jennifer Morrison as Jenny Hagan (season 3), the First Lady of the United States
- Stephen Moyer as the Father (season 3), a meticulous assassin
- Genesis Rodriguez as Isabel De Leon (season 3), a financial journalist for the Financial Register
- Callum Vinson as the Son (season 3), the Father's adopted young child

=== Recurring ===
- Andre Anthony as Colin Worley (season 1), the perpetrator of a bombing in Washington, D.C.
  - Anthony also portrays Matteo Worley, Colin's identical twin brother
- Kari Matchett as Michelle Travers, the President of the United States (seasons 1; guest season 2)
- Robert Patrick as Jamie Hawkins, the Deputy Director of FBI (season 1)
- Christopher Shyer as Ashley Redfield (season 1), the Vice President of the United States
- Toby Levins as Briggs (season 1), the U.S. Secret Service agent who is part of Redfield's detail team
- Ben Cotton as Gordon Wick (season 1), the CEO of a government contractor, Turn Lake Industries
- Brittany Snow as Alice Leeds (season 2), Peter's Night Action partner in Bangkok
- Teddy Sears as Warren Stocker (season 2), a former FBI agent who sells intelligence in Bangkok
- Marjan Neshat as Azita Taheri (season 2), Noor's mother
- Anousha as Haleh (season 2), an aide at the Iranian United Nations Mission in New York and Noor's friend
- Navid Negahban as Abbas Mansuri (season 2), the Iranian ambassador to the United Nations
- Rob Heaps as Tomás Bala (season 2), Markus' cousin and Viktor Bala's moderate, privately educated son
- Elise Kibler as Sloane Killory (season 2), Tomás' girlfriend
- Marwan Kenzari as Sami Saidi (season 2), a Night Action agent and former Delta Force sergeant
- Dikran Tulaine as Viktor Bala (season 2), the deposed dictator and war criminal from an unnamed country imprisoned at The Hague
- Jay Karnes as Wilfred Cole (season 2), a Columbia University chemist connected to the Foxglove program
- Georgia Waehler as Jesse Cole (season 2), Wilfred Cole's daughter
- Suraj Sharma as Jay Batra (season 3), a financial analyst who uncovered financial activity is linked to terrorism
- Zach Appelman as Theo Miller (season 3), Chelsea's fiancé and a member of the White House press team
- Michaela Watkins as Freya Myers (season 3), a bank owner who funded several clients including Monroe
- Gary Hilborn as Trent Patterson (season 3), Chelsea's boss in the Secret Service

== Episodes ==
=== Series overview ===
Season	Episodes	Originally released
1	10	March 23, 2023
2	10	January 23, 2025
3	10	February 19, 2026
4	10	2027

=== Season 1 (2023) ===
No. overall	No. in season	Title	Directed by	Written by	Original release date
1	1	"The Call"	Seth Gordon	Teleplay by : Shawn Ryan	March 23, 2023
FBI special agent Peter Sutherland saves countless civilians from a bombing on the DC Metro. A year later, he is working for White House Chief of Staff Diane Farr at a position monitoring a phone seldom used by the secretive Night Agent program. Rose Larkin is staying with her aunt and uncle Emma and Henry Campbell in Loudoun County, Virginia, when their house is attacked. Before they are both killed, they give Rose a phone number that she calls and is connected to Peter. She is rescued by local police before the assassins can reach her. Peter is instructed by Farr to take Rose into protective custody. Peter explains that the Campbells were members of the Night Agent program. En route to a safe house they are pursued by the assassins, but are able to evade them. Prior to Farr's debriefing the next morning, Rose tells Peter she heard her aunt say that someone in the White House cannot be trusted. Meanwhile, assassin couple Dale and Ellen break into a suburban house in Racine, Wisconsin, killing its owner, and retrieve a hidden bag.
2	2	"Redial"	Seth Gordon	Shawn Ryan	March 23, 2023
In a flashback, several high profile clients of Rose's are hacked due to internal sabotage. She lies in the debrief about seeing Dale's face, and is sent to a hotel under Secret Service protection. Hawkins discloses that the Campbells worked in counterintelligence. Peter matches the ring emblem, that he photographed in episode one, to the House of Karađorđević. He also discovers Hawkins was the Campbells' former handler. Dale takes a call from their employers, who know Rose's whereabouts and want her eliminated. Peter arrives at the hotel, but notices the Secret Service agents are gone. He evacuates Rose and they are pursued unsuccessfully by Ellen and Dale. Peter and Rose revisit the Campbell residence, and travel to her uncle's woodland cabin to retrieve an encrypted hard drive. Hawkins meets with one of the assassins' clients, but is killed for his silence. Farr is informed of his death, and goes to where his body was dumped in a farm site.
3	3	"The Zookeeper"	Guy Ferland	Munis Rashid & Shawn Ryan	March 23, 2023
President Michelle Travers is updated on the investigation into Hawkins death, and one of the assassins' clients is revealed to be Vice President Ashley Redfield. Farr demands the president reveal the Campbells' involvement with Night Action. Peter calls Farr to bring Rose in. Covertly watching the assassins arrive at the cabin, Rose tells Peter that Farr must be the traitor the Campbells warned about. Needing advanced computers to crack the drive, Peter returns to the White House claiming Rose ran. He discreetly opens a remote connection allowing her to download decrypted contents, and wipe originals. Discovering this, Farr confronts Peter, but denies trying to kill them. She reveals the president used the Campbells to investigate the metro bombing and a possible White House mole who was involved. Continuing to ignore Rose's advice, Peter trusts Farr, bringing her into the fold. Secret Service agent Chelsea Arrington who guards Redfield's daughter Maddie at Georgetown University is assigned a new partner, Erik Monks. Returning to duty after being shot saving the previous president, Monks makes a mistake on the first night. Arrington questions his assignment. Maddie's art teacher is revealed to be associated with the metro bomber.
4	4	"Eyes Only"	Ramaa Mosley	Seth Fisher	March 23, 2023
Rose finds several items on the hard drive, including building blueprints, CCTV footage from around DC and documents on the drive about the Peoples Independence Front (PIF), a radical Balkan political organization blamed for the Metro bombing. Spyware is found on Farr's phone, explaining how Peter and Rose were tracked. Rose reluctantly agrees to work with Farr and travels with Peter to an address found on the drive. They meet Lorna, an old friend of the Campbells who helped them gather intelligence, specifically blueprints for buildings and infrastructure around Washington, DC. She determines Peter's interference with the Metro bombing prevented the correct target being destroyed. Arrington discovers Monks is recovering from painkiller addiction and is only still in the job due to his friendship with the Director. Having got the assassins' license plate number at the cabin, Peter gets a friend in the Maryland State Police to trace their car to a residence, but it is empty when they raid it. Dale and Ellen are sent by Redfield to Lorna's house and torture her for information before killing her. Reviewing CCTV on the drive, Peter spots Arrington in multiple videos, deducing the Metro bombing might have been an assassination attempt on her charge.
5	5	"The Marionette"	Guy Ferland	Corey Deshon	March 23, 2023
Peter questions Arrington on who she was protecting the day of the bombing, but she is instructed to divulge no information other than it was not Maddie. Rose further investigates the ring image, tracing the heraldry to the Serbian Pavelić family, relatives of the defunct Yugoslav royal family. Andrej Pavelić, an assemblyman, recently disappeared in Montenegro and a police sketch of a suspect matches that of Dale. Peter visits Hawkins' widow, who reveals her husband always doubted the PIF's alleged involvement in the metro bombing, instead believing government contractor Turn Lake Industries was responsible. Returning to Rose, she reveals that Pavelić was campaigning against US contractors conducting black operations in the Balkans, and referenced Turn Lake by name. She also discovers via the FEC website that they are a major political donor to Vice President Redfield. President Travers orders Peter and Rose to report to the White House. Maddie starts a relationship with her art teacher, and escapes her detail to visit him. However, his associate (involved in the metro bombing) kills him and kidnaps Maddie before Arrington and Monks can reach her.
6	6	"Fathoms"	Ramaa Mosley	Imogen Browder	March 23, 2023
Two years prior, the assassins kill Andrej Pavelić, but Dale keeps his ring. Peter declines to take Rose to the White House with the drive, electing to leave her in the protection of his State Trooper friend Cisco whilst he attends alone with paper copies. He reveals Redfield's connection to Turn Lake and its CEO Gordon Wick to Farr, but deduces she is involved when she alludes to knowing Rose is with a trooper (information he did not provide). Farr worriedly calls Wick, instructing him to kill Rose. Peter warns her and Cisco to run. Farr orders Peter's arrest, but he narrowly escapes the White House via a secret tunnel. Cisco drops off Rose so she can meet Peter at a pre-arranged spot, and is later killed by Ellen. Dale pursues Rose, but after a brutal fight she and Peter are able to kill him. The two seek refuge in a boat owned by Peter's godfather, where Rose treats his wounds. Arrington and Monks continue to investigate the kidnapping. Farr and Redfield argue over their involvement in the conspiracy, and she has Redfield give a press conference where he falsely names Peter as the main suspect in Maddie's disappearance.
7	7	"Best Served Cold"	Adam Arkin	Tiffany Shaw Ho	March 23, 2023
A flashback shows Maddie's younger sister Sarah drowned in the family pool, something her father's negligence caused but he blamed her for. Arrington and Monks investigate an environmentalist group Maddie's art teacher was involved with. A colleague identifies his associate (who kidnapped Maddie) as a man named Matteo. Matteo demands Redfield confess to orchestrating the metro bombing in 2 days, otherwise Maddie will be killed. The three traitorous conspirators – Wick, Farr and Vice President Redfield – discuss how Maddie was planning to publicly ruin her father by leaking the nanny cam footage the assassins retrieved from Wisconsin. The footage shows him assaulting 13 year old Maddie when she refuses to continue being blamed for Sarah's death. A grieving Ellen confronts Wick, and with a knife to his throat he gives her Matteo's last known whereabouts, asking her to kill him in exchange for Peter's location. Farr and Wick, and independently Peter and Rose, identify Matteo as Colin Worley, a former employee of Turn Lake and the metro bomber, who is legally considered dead. Arrington and Monks interview Peter's godfather Jim, a reporter with The Baltimore Sun, and, encountering a photo of him and his godson at the houseboat, track Peter and Rose to the dock and arrest them.
8	8	"Redux"	Adam Arkin	Rachel Wolf	March 23, 2023
It is revealed, Matteo was mistakenly killed (instead of twin brother Colin Worley) by Turn Lake to cover up metro bombing involvement; Colin assumed Matteo's identity before fleeing. Peter and Rose discuss findings with Arrington and Monks, who reluctantly agree to investigate further to prevent a potential second attack. Arrington reveals, during the bombing she was guarding PIF leader Omar Zadar, who met someone from the Travers administration, and bears his codename, Osprey. They deduce he was the intended target. In the Situation Room, President Travers discusses establishing relations with Zadar as an ally for democracy in the Balkans, which Redfield opposes. Redfield discovers Farr and Wick know the kidnapper's identity, and they assure him that Worley is being tracked. Farr amends Ellen's order to kill Maddie also. Maddie discovers a number on metal behind her cell's drywall, and convinces Worley to record another ransom video to send directly to her father. She covertly conveys Arrington's cell number, using a visual code. The team tracks Maddie to a shipping container depot, rescuing her, but having trailed them, Ellen kills Worley and Monks. Rose pushes Ellen off a crane, killing her.
9	9	"The Devil We Know"	Millicent Shelton	Munis Rashid	March 23, 2023
The night of the bombing, Redfield summons Farr and reveals he orchestrated the attack with Wick to kill Zadar, due to him believing he is a terrorist and Wick's activities in the Balkans being threatened should he be elected. With Travers's administration and legacy threatened should anything be discovered, Farr reluctantly agrees to work with them. Peter and Rose flee the depot before backup arrives, and take shelter with his godfather. Arrington plans to take Maddie to President Travers and Secret Service director Almora to tell them the truth, but they are diverted to One Observatory Circle instead. Wick, Redfield and Farr discuss a second attack on Zadar, planned for the following day when he arrives stateside. Rose hacks Ellen's cell, discovering images of files and documents taken inside the Night Action office. They discover Farr took the photos, and forward the evidence to Jim. Rose, Arrington, Maddie and Peter deduce Zadar is meeting the president at Camp David, and Wick likely intends to kill Travers also to elevate Redfield, who can then issue pardons. Farr agrees to help them when she discovers Travers is also under threat, revealing she was not aware of the development as Redfield and Wick have frozen her out.
10	10	"Fathers"	Millicent Shelton	Seth Fisher	March 23, 2023
Redfield, Arrington and Maddie fly to Camp David on Marine Two. Redfield locks himself and Maddie in a basement panic room, telling her Travers is the enemy for cooperating with Zadar. Threatened with the press, Redfield lets Maddie out. Farr uses her position to sneak Peter and Rose into Camp David. She warns Almora of the threat to Travers, but rogue Secret Service agent Briggs kills Almora and shoots Farr. Peter and Arrington realize two bombs were planted. Arrington finds one, releasing Maddie from the basement, evacuating just before Laurel House explodes. Peter discovers the second bomb was planted on Marine One, the president's evacuation helicopter. Pursued by U.S. Marines and Secret Service, he prevents Travers from boarding just before it explodes. Rose keeps Farr alive so she can stand trial. Redfield is arrested, and Maddie agrees to testify against him. Travers provides Peter with conclusive evidence of his father's guilt, but reveals he was planning on becoming a double agent and was assassinated. She recruits Peter to become a full Night Agent. Now in a relationship with Rose, Peter later departs on his first mission.

=== Season 2 (2025) ===
No. overall	No. in season	Title	Directed by	Written by	Original release date
11	1	"Call Tracking"	Guy Ferland	Shawn Ryan	January 23, 2025
Ten months after the attack at Camp David, Peter and his Night Action partner Alice Leeds are compromised while tailing Warren Stocker in Bangkok as he sells intelligence to broker Jacob Monroe. Alice is killed at their extraction point. Peter escapes and goes into hiding, telling his new handler Catherine Weaver he believes someone in the program gave up their location. Rose Larkin, now working for AI marketing company AdVerse, attends therapy to process her PTSD. She gets called by an unknown man telling her Peter is in trouble. Catherine informs Rose he is AWOL. Rose alters AdVerse source code to run facial recognition on CCTV and social media and tracks him to New York City. President Travers reveals Catherine used to work with Peter's father. Peter tracks down Warren to Jamaica, Queens, after stealing his estranged son Ethan's phone. Rose tracks the phone and encounters Peter as he chases Warren, but the two are confronted by Solomon, one of Jacob's gunmen who killed Alice in Bangkok.
12	2	"Disconnected"	Guy Ferland	Tiffany Shaw Ho & Corey Deshon	January 23, 2025
Nine months prior, Peter meets Catherine, who tells him Night Action is investigating an intel leak from the CIA's Bangkok Station. Rose and Peter escape Solomon and his team, and he explains why he is tracking Warren and his current situation. They detain Warren after he tries to flee the country with Ethan. Warren tells Peter the intel he sold was on "Foxglove", an experimental chemical weapons program, but is killed by Jacob's team before he can reveal anything further. Noor Taheri, a New York-based aide to Iranian Ambassador to the UN Abbas Mansuri, attempts to secure political asylum for herself and her family by providing information to the CIA. She tells her handler of rumors Abbas is secretly talking with someone leaking US intelligence information. Catherine and Night Action are copied in, as the CIA and FBI believe it may be Warren. Noor befriends Javad, the new head of security for the Iranian UN Mission.
13	3	"Government Property"	Adam Arkin	Imogen Browder	January 23, 2025
Peter and Rose are pursued separately by Jacob's team, after Peter refuses to tell him what Warren revealed. Rose is rescued by Catherine. The three meet, and Catherine reluctantly allows him and Rose to remain in the field to track down Solomon and identify Jacob. Rose identifies Solomon as a former Marine said to have died six years prior, but her boss revokes her access to AdVerse. Noor follows Ambassador Abbas to a secret appointment and photographs him meeting Solomon and receiving a briefcase. Rose and Peter discover Solomon's disabled sister, Celeste, is receiving recurring payments from a trust. Peter tells Catherine about Foxglove. Tomás Bala, son of imprisoned dictator Viktor Bala, meets with an aide to the British Foreign Secretary to try to negotiate his father's release from The Hague. Markus Dargan, Tomás' cousin, leads a team that steals a truck and hijacks a mobile laboratory associated with the Foxglove program as he scolds Elek for not leaving the occupants alone after tying them up and accuses him of being told no names.
14	4	"Desperate Measures"	Adam Arkin	Anayat Fakhraie	January 23, 2025
Peter meets with Noor as her new handler. He and Rose infiltrate a party at the Iranian Mission to obtain copies of the briefcase contents from Abbas' study. Suspicious of Peter, Javad detains him. Rose has to enter Abbas' study herself but succeeds and scans documents in the briefcase with Noor's phone. Peter escapes the mission after fighting two guards. Catherine tries to visit Celeste but discovers she moved suddenly overnight. Information on the trust paying her also dries up. She confronts CIA director Byron Gedney for an explanation about Bangkok, the death of Alice, and Foxglove. Peter and Catherine scatter Alice's ashes in New York Harbor. Tomás and Markus meet with Solomon, who gives them the Foxglove intel Warren sold to Monroe. Tensions arise between the cousins. The Foxglove contents stolen by Markus are revealed to be nine novel chemical weapons, created for the purpose of developing antidotes. Despite Peter explaining that successful extractions require planning and time, Noor refuses to hand them over until her mother and brother are extracted from Isfahan.
15	5	"A Family Matter"	Ana Lily Amirpour	Munis Rashid	January 23, 2025
Catherine introduces Peter to Sami Saidi, a Night Action agent, tasked with spontaneously extracting Noor's family before her brother Farhad is conscripted in the next 24 hours. Jacob and Solomon make enquiries about Peter and what Night Action is. Javad continues to investigate the events of the party and starts to suspect Noor. Rose's boss at AdVerse comes to support her source code alterations after an investor approves the new tracking functionality and offers funding, promoting her to CTO. Saidi extracts the Taheris, but Farhad's refusal to leave draws the attention of the neighbors and later the police as they drive to the airstrip. Saidi kills the two police officers but Farhad takes one of their guns, says he will tell the authorities that Saidi was an unknown kidnapper (in order to protect Noor from retribution), and fires at Saidi. Saidi shoots Farhad dead and extracts Noor's mother. He tells Peter, who lies to Noor and assures her they are both safe.
16	6	"A Good Agent"	Ana Lily Amirpour	Lukas Johnson	January 23, 2025
Thirteen years prior, Catherine is attacked and her Night Action partner killed whilst surveilling SVR agents receiving intel from Peter's father, a mole in the FBI. Noor gives Rose the USB drive containing the documents, revealed to be DGSE files on Iranian dissidents in Europe. Peter and Catherine hypothesize that Foxglove is related, with Solomon and Jacob obtaining the chemicals for Iran to target its detractors. Noor turns down remaining with the Americans while waiting for her family and returns to the Mission house. Abbas is informed of Farhad's death and tells Noor. Catherine tracks the documents to corrupt French agent Jacqueline Laurent using MIC dots and forces her to arrange a meet with Solomon. Peter and Catherine are able to detain him but not before he kills Laurent. At the ICC Detention Centre, Tomás discovers and reluctantly agrees to take part in his father's plans to have Markus attack the US.
17	7	"Tilt"	Nina Lopez Corrado	Tiffany Shaw Ho	January 23, 2025
Javad follows Noor to a meeting with Rose and Peter, where she confronts them for lying to her about Farhad's death and refuses to let Peter take her to her mother and freedom, not believing her mother is in New York. Noor returns again to the Mission house, where Javad confronts her about her involvement in Farhad's death and asserts that Noor's mother has been captured and imprisoned in Iran. Noor bargains for her life by offering to lead Javad to Peter. Rose meets with Dr. Wilfred Cole, a Columbia University scientist originally involved with Foxglove. Tomás joins Markus' crew in stealing shipments of chemical ingredients used to make Foxglove blister agent KX. Needing Wilfred to make the weapon, Tomás and Markus kidnap him and take his family hostage. Wilfred is knocked unconscious in the struggle, so Rose convinces them she is his postdoctoral fellow who can also help them if they keep her alive. Catherine and Peter interrogate Solomon, who tells the latter he can arrange a meeting with Jacob and provide info to stop the upcoming attack. Peter goes against Catherine's orders and takes Solomon from the safe house.
18	8	"Divergence"	Nina Lopez Corrado	Corey Deshon	January 23, 2025
Tomás and Markus threaten to kill Wilfred's family if he doesn't manufacture KX after they take him and Rose to a mobile lab. Solomon takes Peter to Jacob, who says he will disclose the lab and Rose's location if Peter steals a case file from the UN Secretary-General's office. Peter meets with Noor and asks her for her help to get into the UN Headquarters in Midtown Manhattan and she finally believes that her mother is stateside. They fight and escape Javad and his men. Noor prints a UN guest pass at the mission but is confronted by Abbas. He allows her to leave and inform the French about the DGSE files, as his estranged daughter is on the EU-based dissidents list. Tomás discovers Rose is working for the FBI, but as he questions her she deduces his discomfort with the planned attack and tries to persuade him to help her stop it. After Wilfred explains the devastating effects of KX, Tomás tries to call off the mission, but Markus kills him with a sample of the weapon.
19	9	"Cultural Exchange"	Millicent Shelton	Anayat Fakhraie & Imogen Browder	January 23, 2025
Peter obtains the Secretary General's file from UN Headquarters, and Noor gives DGSE files to the French, warning about Iran's plans to hunt defectors. She escapes Javad again and Saidi gets her to her mother. Catherine kills Solomon as he holds her at gunpoint. After Javad threatens Abbas, the ambassador has him arrested, utilizing CCTV footage of him and Noor to make it appear they were conspiring together. Peter gives the file to Jacob, who reveals that Viktor Bala used KX on his own people before being deposed, but the UN and ICC concealed that the US supplied it. Jacob gives Peter the lab location on condition Peter works for him. Markus has Rose and Wilfred create a knockout gas to incapacitate five guards watching the pair, but only three are immediately affected. Peter arrives, defeating the remaining guards, but Wilfred is beaten unconscious. Catherine, police, and FBI arrive after Rose and Peter save each other and Wilfred's family. Markus arrives at the evacuated UN Headquarters, and his men load KX canisters into the system.
20	10	"Buyer's Remorse"	Millicent Shelton	Munis Rashid	January 23, 2025
Eight years prior, Jacob met Richard Hagan, present-day governor of Kansas and isolationist presidential candidate. Markus accuses Peter, Rose and Wilfred of fighting his team. On the rooftop, he kills two UNDSS agents, disguising himself. Peter and Catherine accompany NYPD ESU against Markus' men to secure the KX. Markus escapes with one canister, while hazmat teams secure fourteen others. Jacob learns about Solomon's death. At Tomás' girlfriend Sloane Killroy's hotel, Markus holds her at gunpoint. Peter and Rose save Sloane and kill Markus, finding the canister rigged to the HVAC. They use a chemical fire tactic to close vents before it deploys. Viktor asks George whether he should pray for anyone. Peter and Rose agree they can't risk being together; he is arrested for helping Jacob. Noor and her mother settle in Illinois. Jacob gives the UN file to Richard who leaks evidence that presidential opponent Patrick Knox used his position as CIA director to supply KX to Viktor Bala. Patrick drops out, virtually guaranteeing Richard the presidency and ensuring secrets broker Jacob can access untold information. Catherine releases Peter, instructing him to act as a double agent against Jacob and wait for his call.

=== Season 3 (2026) ===
No. overall	No. in season	Title	Directed by	Written by	Original release date
21	1	"Call Waiting"	Guy Ferland	Munis Rashid	February 19, 2026
A year later, Peter is yet to be contacted by Monroe. Flight Pima 12 is shot down over Venezuela, killing 157 Americans on board. Hagan, now President, blames Raul Zapata and his terror group La Fuerza de La Soberanía (LFS) and promises retribution. After busting Pentagon employees selling Columbia-class submarine schematics, Peter tracks Jay Batra, a FinCEN analyst accused of stealing intel and killing his supervisor Ben Wallace, to Istanbul. Peter discovers Batra gave the intel to Financial Register journalist Isabel De Leon. Batra claims Wallace tried to cover up Suspicious Activity Reports (SARs) of transfers from American companies to an LFS crypto wallet, and was killed accidentally in a struggle when he threatened Batra and pulled a gun. Peter notes this implies the recent Pima 12 attack was funded by someone stateside. The two are pursued through the city by armed assailants, who Peter kills. While extracting Batra from Turkey to be questioned by the FBI, Peter is called by Monroe, who says he wants Batra.
22	2	"Package Deal"	Guy Ferland	Anayat Fakhraie	February 19, 2026
Back in the US, Peter tells Mosley and Catherine he believes Monroe funded the LFS attack on Pima 12 via the companies. They get Peter to demand names of five corrupt agents from Monroe in exchange for Batra. Believing they can both obtain the moles identities and arrest Monroe at the handover, Batra agrees to accompany Peter. However, Monroe anticipates the betrayal, and leads Catherine and a JTTF team to a duplicate car rigged with explosives, which kills her. He keeps Batra and releases Peter without the names, demanding blind obedience moving forward. Isabel shows the intel to her editor Mike Fonseca, and identifies Peter as FBI and involved in extracting Batra. They track down Vernon Tyvek, the former banking compliance officer who filed the SARs. He points them to veterans non-profit Heroes In Healing, the only suspect company that wasn't a generic shell corporation. However, Mike is killed by the Father, an assassin, after meeting with a contact in Washington, D.C. but before updating Isabel.
23	3	"Dark Matters"	Adam Arkin	Seth Fisher	February 19, 2026
Monroe tells Freya Myers, head of Walcott Capital where the SARs came from, that Batra is dead. He says if she introduces him to one of her clients, he will re-open his accounts. Peter suspects Monroe has cancer. He and Mosley brief President Hagan on Batra's intel and that Monroe is behind the Pima 12 attack. Hagan tells them to continue as planned and update him. Peter privately questions Mosley about who they report to if they prove the suspected link between Monroe and the President. Hagan tells his wife, First Lady Jenny Hagan, that Monroe provided the Foxglove intel that got him elected. Arrington, now on the presidential protection detail, shoots an intruder in the residence who Jenny says has a gun, but he is revealed to be unarmed. Isabel finds Vernon dead at his house, and Peter saves her from being killed by the Father. The two agree to work together to find Batra. Reviewing Mike's notes they link Heroes In Healing to funding Senator George Lansing. Peter meets Adam Corrigan, his new Night Action partner.
24	4	"Orion"	Adam Arkin	Eileen Myers	February 19, 2026
Peter suspects Adam, who was assigned directly by Hagan. Arrington questions why Jenny didn't activate her panic button when first confronted by the intruder, White House butler Brian Mott. She also remembers the First Lady took his phone in the aftermath. Peter joins Isabel when she is invited to interview Senator Lansing at an exclusive hunting lodge. Lansing is spooked when she mentions his main donor funding LFS, and offers her a deal for alternative information to drop her inquiries. When she declines and confirms her intention to identify the donor, Lansing admits to taking their dark money but swears he didn't realise they funded the Pima 12 attack until afterwards. Fearing repercussions, he threatens to shoot Isabel but Peter intervenes. However, the Father then kills Lansing and pursues an injured Peter and Isabel into the woods. They are saved by Adam, who wounds the assassin. The Father's young son, who he takes on "business trips", is shocked when he inadvertently witnesses the true nature of his work.
25	5	"The Isolation Play"	Paris Barclay	Corey Deshon	February 19, 2026
Eight months prior, Hagan recruits Adam, a CIA contractor and his former Army superior, into Night Action. Adam and Peter clone the phone and computer of David Hutson, a Heroes In Healing co-founder Lansing met before his death. They show links to the LFS but not Monroe. Batra is alive in captivity, and shows Monroe new deposits have been made to the LFS crypto wallet, suggesting a further attack is imminent. The Father finds Isabel's discarded phone and treats his gunshot wound. Hagan tells Jenny that Monroe is possibly linked with the LFS, so they need to disassociate from him as a donor. Arrington grows more suspicious of Jenny, and discovers she met with Mott and he received payments from CorePoint, one of the shell companies. She takes his phone from Jenny's desk, and calls Peter with her concerns. Peter updates Isabel, who says she will visit a source that could shed some light on the complex shell company structure. He tails her to meeting, and is shocked to see her greet Monroe.
26	6	"Murky Waters"	Paris Barclay	Imogen Browder	February 19, 2026
In a flashback eight years prior, the Father causes the death of couple in their sleep by carbon dioxide poisioning. Before escaping, he finds an infant child alive in a nearby room and it is implied that he keeps the child alive. In present, Adam and Peter follow Monroe and Isabel to a large mansion and formally ID him via facial recognition. They determine from tapping their conversation and a favour from Adam's Langley contact he is Isabel's estranged father, who was also a CIA asset in the 90s in Mexico City. She accuses him of kidnapping Batra, financing the Pima 12 attack and organising Mike and Lansing's deaths, which he denies. Isabel discovers Batra being held in the house and calls Peter to break him out. Batra tells Peter about the upcoming LFS attack. The Father's son confronts him, but the assassin convinces him he is a spy working for the "good guys". Adam tails Monroe to Walcott Capital, where he threatens Freya to get her client to stop pursuing Isabel. She declines, and instead orders the Father to take out Batra, Isabel, Peter, Adam, and Monroe. Jenny discovers Arrington took Mott's phone from her desk. Peter, Batra and Isabel escape the house when the Father launches an attack. Peter tells Isabel he knows Monroe is her dad.
27	7	"Once Upon a Time..."	Hiromi Kamata	Andrés Smith	February 19, 2026
In 1995, corporate lawyer Monroe is blackmailed into spying on his employer, Zapata, who the CIA suspect is an arms trafficker. He also starts dating Zapata's employee Sofia De Leon in secret, and discovers the value of playing both sides and trading information. Monroe is led to believe Zapata killed Sofia suspecting she was the mole, and the CIA refused to help her. However, in 2011 he uses his skills and intel to blackmail his former handler, who confirms Sofia gave birth to Isabel before dying in prison after being framed for Zapata's crimes. With Monroe identified, the government starts investigating his businesses and trusts. The Father pursues Monroe, who locks himself in a safe room. He bargains with Peter for help in exchange for intel on the next LFS attack, and all corrupt agents and politicians he owns. Peter reluctantly rescues him with Adam, and Monroe provides him a rare misprint of Grimms' Fairy Tales used as his personal intel database cipher. However, Peter is kidnapped by the Father during the extraction.
28	8	"Truth Be Told"	Hiromi Kamata	Anayat Fakhraie & Corey Deshon	February 19, 2026
Four days prior, Mott and Jenny argue over being coerced into supplying Monroe with classified intelligence briefings. She refuses, but when he tries to send photos she manipulates Arrington into killing him. The Father interrogates Peter with sodium thiopental for Isabel, Batra and Monroe's location. His son disobeys and follows him, allowing Peter to manipulate the boy into freeing him. Using the child as a human shield, Peter escapes with the cipher book. Monroe tells Isabel that Freya and Walcott Capital are targeting her, as if she publishes her story they will be linked with LFS. Hagan reluctantly lets Monroe interrogate Hutson, who for his own protection divulges Zapata's location. Arrington gives Mott's unlocked phone to USSS Director Patterson, but he questions her suspicions about Jenny and puts her on disciplinary leave. Jenny tells Hagan about her involvement with Monroe. Adam receives a surprise call, and suddenly shoots Monroe dead instead of transporting him to federal custody, framing it as suicide.
29	9	"Lockstep"	Billy Gierhart	Aiyana K. White	February 19, 2026
During Hagan's campaign, Jenny becomes indebted to Monroe by using her charity to illegally launder his $6 million direct donation. Adam lies to Peter about Monroe's death. Arrington finds Isabel at Peter's apartment, and the two start investigating Jenny's culpability. Peter tells Isabel of her father's death, but she suspects foul play. He tells them both Hagan became President due to Monroe. Batra logs a nearby LFS crypto withdrawal in New Jersey, allowing Peter, Adam and Arrington to stop several truck bombs headed for New York. Batra helps Isabel decrypt Monroe's cipher, and his database implicates the Hagans. Hagan orders a drone strike that kills Zapata. He admonishes Jenny, but initiates a coverup, having Patterson drop the investigation and ordering Adam to kill Arrington. Arrington's White House staffer fiance Theo warns her the President is framing her. Peter tells Hagan he knows he is using Adam to cover his and Jenny's tracks. After ignoring a stand down order, Hagan accuses him of treason.
30	10	"Razzmatazz"	Billy Gierhart	Seth Fisher & Munis Rashid	February 19, 2026
Peter rescues Arrington from Adam, and warns him that he is being manipulated by the Hagans. Batra and Isabel tell the Register board how Walcott Capital is implicated with Zapata, Monroe and Jenny, but they won't publish without solid proof. Isabel tries to use Monroe's intel to blackmail Freya into going on record. The Father declines Freya's instructions, opting to live a quiet life with his son since the confrontation with Peter. As Isabel confronts Freya, they are targeted by assassins working with Adam. Arrington takes Isabel to the Register and Batra, whilst Peter extracts Freya. Confronted by Adam, Peter convinces him of the Hagans' duplicity, getting the past to the Register's office. Isabel interviews Freya on a livestream, where she implicates the Hagans. Five weeks later, the President pardons himself and Jenny. The Father meets with and poisons Freya. Peter meets with Mosley, who promises to assign him to a good partner.

== Production ==
=== Development ===
On December 24, 2020, it was announced that Sony Pictures Television would produce the TV series adaptation of Matthew Quirk's novel The Night Agent, with Shawn Ryan as writer. On July 21, 2021, the series was acquired by Netflix, with Seth Gordon set to direct the pilot and produce the ten-episode series with Ryan, Marney Hochman, Julia Gunn, James Vanderbilt, William Sherak, Paul Neinstein, Nicole Tossou and David Beaubaire. On March 29, 2023, Netflix renewed it for a 10-episode second season. On October 8, 2024, ahead of the second-season premiere, Netflix renewed the series for a third season. On March 6, 2026, Netflix renewed the series for a fourth season. On May 4, 2026, it was announced that the series would end with its fourth season.

=== Casting ===
On November 22, 2021, Gabriel Basso and Luciane Buchanan were cast in the series. On February 1, 2022, Hong Chau, D. B. Woodside, Fola Evans-Akingbola, Eve Harlow, Phoenix Raei, Enrique Murciano and Sarah Desjardins joined the cast as regulars. On February 24, 2023, Kari Matchett joined in a recurring role. On December 8, 2023, Amanda Warren was cast as a series regular for the second season. On January 11, 2024, Berto Colon, Louis Herthum, and Arienne Mandi joined the cast as new series regulars while Brittany Snow and Teddy Sears were cast in recurring roles for the second season. On February 16, 2024, Michael Malarkey and Keon Alexander were cast as new series regulars while Navid Negahban and Rob Heaps joined the cast in recurring capacities for the second season. On March 26, 2024, Marwan Kenzari, Elise Kibler, and Dikran Tulaine joined the cast in guest roles for the second season. On November 19, 2024, Genesis Rodriguez was cast as a series regular for the third season. On December 13, 2024, David Lyons, Jennifer Morrison, Stephen Moyer, and Callum Vinson joined the cast as new series regulars while Suraj Sharma joined in a recurring role for the third season. On January 31, 2025, Ward Horton and Albert Jones were promoted to series regulars for the third season while Evans-Akingbola was confirmed to be returning as a series regular after having made a guest appearance in the second season. On September 12, 2025, in an interview with Deadline Hollywood, Buchanan revealed that she would not return for the third season. On April 22, 2026, Titus Welliver, Trevante Rhodes, Li Jun Li, and Elizabeth Lail joined the cast as series regulars for the fourth season. On May 5, 2026, Abigail Breslin and David Denman were cast as series regulars while Annabeth Gish joined the cast in a recurring role for the fourth season. On June 12, 2026, it was reported that Buchanan is set to return to reprise her role as Rose Larkin for the fourth and final season.

=== Filming ===
The first season was filmed in British Columbia, Canada, with the city of Vancouver standing in for Washington, D.C. Filming for the second season began on February 5, 2024, in New York City, with additional filming in Thailand and Washington D.C. It was announced on June 17, 2024, that the second season had concluded filming. Filming for the third season began in February 2025 and concluded July 14, 2025. Filming locations for the third season included New York, Washington, D.C., Turkey, Mexico, and Dominican Republic. The fourth season began filming on May 4, 2026, in Los Angeles after securing a $31.6-million Californian tax credit to film there. It wrapped on September 30, 2026.

== Release ==
The first season of The Night Agent was released on Netflix on March 23, 2023. The second season premiered on January 23, 2025. The third season premiered on February 19, 2026. The fourth and final season is set to premiere in 2027.

== Reception ==
=== Audience viewership ===
According to Netflix, Season 1 had 168.71 million hours of worldwide views over its first four days, the third-highest for a new series. In its second week, it amassed 216.4 million hours of views. In its third week, it gained 130.48 million hours of views, and became the streamer's ninth-most-viewed series, with a total 515.57 million hours viewed. By 25 days, it accrued 605.62 million total hours, emerging as the streamer's sixth-most viewed series.

Between its release and June 2023 the series totaled 812.1 million hours watched, the most of any Netflix original in that time span.

According to U.S. weekly streaming data reported by Media Play News using metrics from PlumResearch, The Night Agent attracted 14.9 million unique viewers on Netflix during the week ending April 2, 2023, with an average time spent of 224 minutes per viewer.

=== Critical response ===
Critical response of The Night Agent
Season	Rotten Tomatoes	Metacritic
1	75% (32 reviews)	68 (13 reviews)
2	86% (29 reviews)	67 (10 reviews)
3	86% (14 reviews)	77 (5 reviews)

For the first season, the review aggregator website Rotten Tomatoes reported a 75% approval rating based on 32 critic reviews. The website's critics consensus reads, "Bingeable as a beach read and just as forgettable, The Night Agent is a routine spy thriller told with commendable bravado." Metacritic, which uses a weighted average, assigned a score of 68 out of 100 based on 13 critics, indicating "generally favorable" reviews.

Lucy Mangan of The Guardian gave the show 4 out of 5 stars, writing: "It is propulsive, slicker-than-slick fun, with every hairpin turn perfectly negotiated. There are fine performances—especially from Basso, who is getting two or three notes out of what could easily have been a one-note part." Comparing The Night Agent and Rabbit Hole in the New York Times, Mike Hale writes: "The two new shows are ... cheerfully, maddeningly implausible. Night Agent is on more of a meat-and-potatoes level... but it strings the viewer along in sufficiently teasing fashion to carry hard-core fans of the genre through its 10 episodes."

The second season has an 86% approval rating on Rotten Tomatoes, based on 29 critic reviews, with an average rating of 6.6/10. The website's critics consensus states, "Growing more assured in its second season, The Night Agent executes its mission to entertain with no muss or fuss." On Metacritic, it has a weighted average score of 67 out of 100 based on 10 critics, indicating "generally favorable" reviews.

On Rotten Tomatoes, the third season holds an approval rating of 86% based on 14 critic reviews. On Metacritic, it has a weighted average score of 77 out of 100 based on 5 critics, indicating "generally favorable" reviews.

=== Accolades ===
Award	Year (Note: The listed year refers to the date of the ceremony, not necessarily the year in which the corresponding season or episode aired, and is linked, where available, to the ceremony's article.)	Category	Nominee(s)	Result	Ref.
Astra TV Awards	2024	Best Supporting Actress in a Streaming Series, Drama	Sarah Desjardins	Nominated	
Critics' Choice Super Awards	2024	Best Action Series, Limited Series or Made-for-TV Movie	The Night Agent	Nominated	
Critics' Choice Super Awards	2024	Best Actor in an Action Series, Limited Series or Made-for-TV Movie	Gabriel Basso	Nominated	
Critics' Choice Super Awards	2024	Best Actress in an Action Series, Limited Series or Made-for-TV Movie	Luciane Buchanan	Nominated	
Hollywood Professional Association	2023	Outstanding Supporting Visual Effects – Episode or Series Season	Grant Miller, Hallana Barbosa, Pierceon Bellemare, Mariia Osanova, Ben Stommes	Nominated	
People's Choice Awards	2024	The Bingeworthy Show of the Year	The Night Agent	Nominated	
UBCP/ACTRA Awards	2023	Best Supporting Performance, Series	Christopher Shyer	Nominated	
