= The New Legends of Monkey =

Australian–New Zealand television series

- Genre: Action; Comedy; Fantasy; Adventure
- Based on: Journey to the West by Wu Cheng'en
- Written by: Jacquelin Perske; Craig Irvin; Samantha Strauss
- Starring: Chai Hansen; Luciane Buchanan; Josh Thomson; Emilie Cocquerel
- Composer: Peter van der Fluit
- Countries of origin: Australia; New Zealand
- Original language: English
- No. of series: 2
- No. of episodes: 20

Production
- Producers: Rachael Gardner; Robin Scholes
- Cinematography: D.J. Stipsen; Dave Garbett
- Editors: Mat Evans; Dany Cooper; Nicole La Macchia
- Running time: 24 minutes
- Production companies: See-Saw Films; Jump Film and TV

Original release
- Network: ABC Me (Australia); TVNZ 2 (New Zealand); Netflix (Other territories)
- Release: 28 January 2018 – 7 August 2020

The New Legends of Monkey is a fantasy adventure television series inspired by Monkey, a Japanese production from the 1970s and 1980s which garnered a cult following in New Zealand, Australia, the UK and South Africa. The Japanese production was based on the 16th-century Chinese novel Journey to the West. This new series is an international co-production between the Australian Broadcasting Corporation, New Zealand's TVNZ and Netflix.

The first season, consisting of ten episodes, premiered on the Australian Broadcasting Corporation's ABC Me television channel in Australia on 28 January 2018, and later debuted outside Australia and New Zealand on Netflix on 28 April. A second season, also ten episodes, was released on Netflix on 7 August 2020.

== Premise ==
It follows a young monk, escorted by a group of gods, on a journey across an ancient and fantastical land now ruled by evil demons to collect lost scrolls of wisdom.

== Plot ==
The Monkey King was imprisoned under a mountain 500 years ago by his enemies in Heaven. Five hundred years later, the Earthly realm is overrun, and its humans oppressed, by demons. The gods and immortals are in hiding or oppressed by demons as well. A scholar secretly concocts a plan to bring together a few warriors and a monk, named Tripitaka, to undertake a quest to resurrect the Monkey King and find the Heavenly scrolls that were stolen by Monkey 500 years ago and hidden away secretly on earth. Anyone who finds the scrolls would gain unlimited power. However, the night the group is about to start on their quest, a demon attacks the scholar's home and kills everyone inside except for the scholar's adopted daughter, taking the golden crown necessary to revive the Monkey King. In his last moments, the scholar entrusts his daughter with the quest. She takes on the identity of Tripitaka and ventures out into the world, narrowly escaping death herself.

In a town she gives charity to a monk and ends up forced to work for a tavern owner, thus gaining a job and a room to sleep in. When the same demon that killed her adoptive father shows up, she secretly steals the magical crown and makes a run for it. When demons begin searching the town for her and the magic crown, she is disguised as a monk by the same monk she helped and successfully makes her way out of the city. In an opening along the side of a mountain, she finds the stony visage of the Monkey King's face, and puts the crown on his head. Finally, the Monkey King is free but he soon discovers that the crown is repressing most of his godly abilities. The pair return to the town and join up with Pigsy and Sandy, who are also gods, and the four of them begin their quest of finding the lost scrolls and gaining enough power to overthrow all the demons.

== Cast ==
=== Main ===
- Chai Hansen as Monkey (Sūn Wùkōng / 孫悟空) - an egoistic but selfless god, who was exiled for 500 years and freed by Tripitaka on a mission to retrieve the scrolls from the demons as well as liberating people from oppressive demonic rule. Hansen also plays a clone Monkey named Shadow Monkey (season 2).
- Luciane Buchanan as Tripitaka (Táng Sānzàng / 唐三藏) - a young orphan, who was adopted and raised by a scholar, was tasked to retrieve the scrolls from demons and free Monkey from a 500 year old exile. Initially a nameless character, she assumed the name Tripitaka in order to accompany Monkey, Pigsy and Sandy on her mission to retrieve scrolls, lying about her gender. She has the ability to calm Monkey by using chants.
- Josh Thomson as Pigsy (Zhū Bàjiè / 猪八戒) - the most intelligent and strongest god among the main characters, he has powers to control electricity using his weapon rake. His other skills include cooking. He worked under a demon Princess Locke, who he is romantically involved with and later deserted before he joined Tripitaka, Monkey and Sandy on their mission.
- Emilie Cocquerel as Sandy (Shā Wùjìng / 沙悟浄) - a very quirky but caring and compassionate god, who has a great sense of humor and a selfless ego. Initially mistaken as a demon, she has powers to manipulate water and to teleport as well as to manipulate human emotions.

=== Recurring ===
- Jarred Blakiston as Font Demon (season 1)
- Josh McKenzie as Davari (season 1)
- Jordan Mooney as Raxion (season 1)
- Daniel Watterson as Shaman (season 1)
- Bryony Skillington as Princess Locke (season 1) - a demon ruler of the town Palawa, before was imprisoned and sent away by Pigsy, who worked for her as her right hand man. She was also romantically involved with Pigsy during his time with her as her right hand man.
- Chelsie Preston Crayford as Gwen (season 1) - a god who is one of the responsible for exiling Monkey for 500 years, after wrongfully accusing him of murdering their master who was actually killed by the demons (episode 6). Realizing her fault, Gwen reconnected and reconciled with Monkey and joins Tripitaka and the gods on their mission, only to die after saving Tripitaka's life from poison by transfusing poison from the former into hers (episode 7). She is the first one to know about Tripitaka's identity.
- Rachel House as Monica (season 1-2)
- Jayden Daniels as Gaxin/the real Tripitaka (season 1-2) - a monk who was initially tasked to retrieve the scrolls from demons and free Monkey from a 500-year exile, being killed by the demons along with warriors before starting their mission (season 1). He also went to be renamed as Tripitaka, a name known to gods. It was instead given the responsibility to a scholar's adoptive daughter. However, Gaxin is seen resurrected in the last three episodes of season 2 only to die again after an attempt to retrieve the scroll inside a tree.
- Atticus Iti as Kaedo Zef (season 2) - a young boy who befriends Monkey and his companions and helps them in their mission.
- Michelle Ang as General Khan (season 2)
- Fasitua Amosa as Dreglon (season 2)
- Simon Prast as Hagfish (season 2)
- Tawanda Manyimo as Gorm (season 2)
- Natasha Daniel as Mothrax (season 2)
- Katherine Kennard as Mycelia (season 2)

== Episodes ==
Series	Episodes	Originally released	
Series	Episodes	First released	Last released
1	10	28 January 2018	4 February 2018
2	10	7 August 2020	

=== Season 1 (2018) ===
No. overall	No. in season	Title	Directed by	Written by	Original release date
1	1	"Hope Must Never Die"	Gerard Johnstone	Jacquelin Perske	28 January 2018
After a demon steals a magical crown from warrior monks, an orphaned girl flees the monastery in a quest to awaken the long-petrified Monkey King.
2	2	"The Edge of Nowhere"	Gerard Johnstone	Jacquelin Perske	28 January 2018
Tripitaka learns a troubling legend about Monkey, but the pair gains a surprising new ally before setting out to find the seven sacred scrolls.
3	3	"The Journey Begins"	Gerard Johnstone	Jacquelin Perske	28 January 2018
A demon jeopardises the trio's quest before it even begins. Tripitaka makes a startling discovery about Pigsy, who makes a momentous decision.
4	4	"The Monkey King Returns"	Gerard Johnstone	Craig Irvin & Jacquelin Perske	29 January 2018
An eccentric clan of loyal Monkey King zealots guides the group toward a sacred scroll's hiding place, but booby traps and betrayal await them.
5	5	"The Breaking Ground"	Craig Irvin	Craig Irvin	30 January 2018
A shaman uses trance-like mind games to trick the gods into translating divine scrolls, sending Monkey dangerously far into his own subconscious.
6	6	"A Crown Does Not Make You"	Craig Irvin	Jacquelin Perske	31 January 2018
Trapped in the depths of his mind, Monkey relives terrible events of centuries before, when his arrogance led to tragedy and his banishment.
7	7	"Until I Met You"	Gerard Johnstone	Craig Irvin	1 February 2018
The shaman hires nightmarish forest dwellers to hunt the group down. A foe from Monkey's past sows seeds of doubt in Tripitaka's mind.
8	8	"A Part of You That's Missing"	Gerard Johnstone	Samantha Strauss	2 February 2018
Tripitaka leaves the quest to find her mother but faces even greater peril. Monkey and Pigsy strike a bargain with the demon hounding them.
9	9	"In Search of Tripitaka"	Craig Irvin	Craig Irvin	3 February 2018
With help from an unlikely ally, Monkey and Pigsy infiltrate Jade Mountain to help Tripitaka thwart the fiendish plans of demon master Davari. Tripitaka admits her identity to Monkey after he arrives to get her out of her cell.
10	10	"A Hero to Save Us All"	Craig Irvin	Jacquelin Perske	4 February 2018
As Davari's quest for immortality nears fruition, Tripitaka races to unlock a secret that could destroy the demon's hold on power.

=== Season 2 (2020) ===
No. overall	No. in season	Title	Directed by	Written by	Original release date
11	1	"Graveyard of the Gods"	Peter Andrikidis	Christiaan Van Vuuren	7 August 2020
The Monkey King, Tripitaka, Pigsy, and Sandy set out in search of the sacred scrolls. Demons learn of Monkey's return and vow to destroy him.
12	2	"Quest for Knowledge"	Peter Andrikidis	Connor Van Vuuren	7 August 2020
At the Archive of Infinite Scrolls, Monkey and friends must solve—and survive—various riddles to gain access to the Scroll of Knowledge.
13	3	"Village of Lost Children"	Peter Andrikidis	Jane Allen	7 August 2020
A shape-shifting demon uses her powers to assume Sandy's appearance, then kidnaps village children to make Monkey's group seem like the evil ones.
14	4	"Puppet Master"	Peter Andrikidis	Craig Irvin	7 August 2020
On the path to the Scroll of Creation, the demon Hagfish reveals who is pulling all the strings when he traps Tripitaka in his doll collection.
15	5	"Finding Paradise"	Thomas Robins	Greg Waters	7 August 2020
The Monkey King and crew meet the mysterious Mycelia in a garden that is too good to be true before helping Pigsy avoid a flavorful but deadly fate.
16	6	"Gladiators"	Thomas Robins	Jane Allen	7 August 2020
Monkey hatches a plan to retrieve the scrolls from the demon Gorm by posing as a human, while a dispute between demon generals leads to an epic battle.
17	7	"Masterchef"	Thomas Robins	Craig Irvin	7 August 2020
As the demons head to Lion Heart Rock to fight Monkey, Pigsy must sharpen his skills in the kitchen to impress General Khan as her personal chef.
18	8	"The Real Tripitaka"	Thomas Robins	Greg Waters	7 August 2020
The scrolls foretold of only one Tripitaka ... but when Monkey and friends reach Lion Heart Rock, they discover that might not be so true.
19	9	"The Spider Web"	Thomas Robins	Connor Van Vuuren	7 August 2020
The rebel army ignores Tripitaka's warning and ends up regretting it while on the battlefield. Hagfish creates a clone whose powers may match Monkey's.
20	10	"Shadow Boxing"	Peter Andrikidis	Christiaan Van Vuuren	7 August 2020
With the rebels scattered and the fate of the sacred scrolls still at stake, Monkey realises he is his own worst enemy—in more ways than one.

== Broadcast ==
The first three episodes debuted in Australia on 28 January as a single 90-minute telemovie. Subsequent episodes of the ten-episode series were released daily until 4 February 2018. It debuted on Netflix worldwide on 28 April 2018. In late October 2020, CBBC acquired television broadcast rights to the series in the United Kingdom, despite Netflix already holding the rights in the country, and planned to air it by early 2021.

The New Legends of Monkey premiered in the Philippines on GMA. It was aired from 31 October to 25 November 2022, and dubbed into Tagalog/Filipino.

== Reception ==
The review aggregator website Rotten Tomatoes reported an approval rating of 100% with an average rating of 6/10, based on 6 critic reviews.

== Awards and nominations ==
2018 New Zealand Television Awards

- Best Children's Program (nominated)
- Best Cinematography: DJ Stipsen (nominated)
- Best Original Score: Peter van der Fluit (nominated)
- Best Costume Design: Liz McGregor (nominated)
- Best Make-up Design: Susie Glass, Jacqueline Leung, Joe Whelan (won)

8th AACTA Awards

- Best Children's Program (nominated)
- Best Costume Design in Television: Liz McGregor (nominated)

18th Annual Screen Producers Australia (SPA) Awards

- Children's Series Production of the Year (nominated)

46th Daytime Creative Arts Emmy Awards

- Outstanding Cinematography: DJ Stipsen (nominated)
- Outstanding Sound Mixing (nominated)
- Outstanding Sound Editing for a Live Action Program (nominated)
- Outstanding Costume Design/Styling: Liz McGregor (won)

48th Daytime Emmy Awards

- Outstanding Art Direction/Set Decoration/Scenic Design (nominated)
- Outstanding Sound Mixing and Editing (won)
- Outstanding Principal Performance in a Children’s Programme: Emilie Cocquerel (nominated)

ASSG Awards 2021

- Best Sound for a Children’s Programme (nominated)
