= Alabama Moon =

2006 novel

- Cover Art
- Author: Watt Key
- Language: English
- Genre: Children's literature, young adult fiction
- Publisher: Square Fish & Farrar, Straus and Giroux
- Publication date: 2006 (1st edition), 2010 (2nd edition paperback)
- Publication place: United States
- Media type: Print (hardback & paperback)
- Pages: 304 p. (hardback edition)
- ISBN: 0-374-30184-0
- OCLC: 62172841

Alabama Moon is a 2006 novel by Watt Key. The story follows the adventures of Alabama native Moon Blake.

Following the release of the published work, a movie based upon the book titled Alabama Moon was released September 27, 2009.

== Synopsis ==
After the death of his father, ten-year-old Moon leaves their forest shelter home and is sent to an Alabama institution, becoming entangled in the outside world he has never known and making good friends, a relentless enemy, and finally a new life.
