= Watt Key =

American author (born 1970)

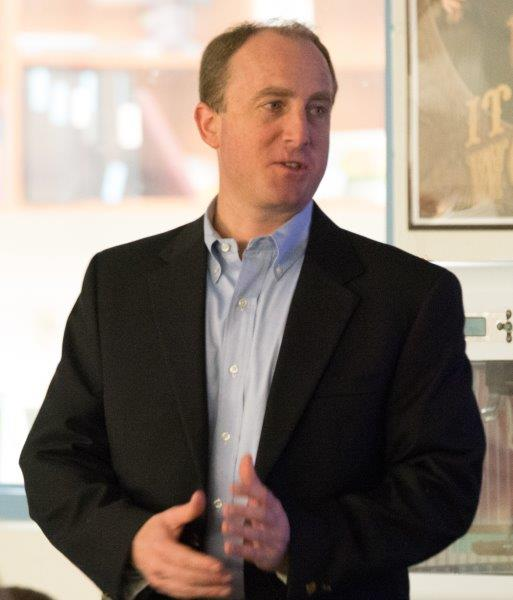
- Born: Albert Watkins Key, Jr. October 28, 1970 (age 56); Tuscaloosa, Alabama, U.S.
- Education: Birmingham–Southern College (BA); Spring Hill College (MBA)
- Occupation: Writer
- Spouse: Katie Feore Key (1994–present)
- Children: Adele Key, Albert Key, and Mary Michael Key
- Writing career
- Notable works: Alabama Moon (ISBN 978-0-374-30184-2, 1st edition hardback); Dirt Road Home, Fourmile
- Notable awards: E.B. White Read-Aloud Award (2007)

Albert Watkins Key Jr., publishing under the name Watt Key and Albert Key, is an American fiction author who is known for writing young-adult survival fiction. A resident of Alabama, his debut novel Alabama Moon was published by Farrar, Straus and Giroux in 2006 and was the 2007 winner of the E.B. White Read-Aloud Award for older readers. It received a 2006 Parents' Choice Award. Alabama Moon has been translated and published in eight languages. In 2015 Alabama Moon was listed by TIME Magazine as one of the top 100 young-adult books of all time.

Alabama Moon was made into a 2009 feature film starring John Goodman.

== Personal life ==
Watt Key is a graduate of Bayside Academy in Daphne, Alabama and received his Bachelor of Arts degree from Birmingham–Southern College in Birmingham, Alabama. He earned his Masters of Business Administration from Spring Hill College in Mobile, Alabama. While working as a computer programmer, he began submitting novels to publishers in New York City. When he was 34, he sold his debut novel, Alabama Moon, to publisher Farrar, Straus and Giroux.

Watt currently lives with his wife and three children in Mobile, Alabama.

== Awards and honors ==
- Alabama Moon (2006)
  - American Library Association Best Books for Young Adults
  - E. B. White Read Aloud Award, 2007
  - ALLA Young Adult Book Award
  - Auckland Council librarian's choice
  - SIBA Young Adult Book Award, 2007
  - Parents' Choice Award Winner
  - California Young Reader Medal
  - Illinois Rebecca Caudill Young Readers Choice Award Master List
  - Indiana Young Hoosier Award Master List
  - James Medison University Book Award List: Best Books For Young Adults
  - Maine Student Book Award Master List
  - Missouri Truman Readers Award Master List
  - Massachusetts Children's Book Award Master List for 2011
  - Volunteer State Book Award Nominees
  - Wildcat Book Award Nominees 2008-2009
  - Deutscher Jugendliteraturpreis, children's book nominees 2009
- Dirt Road Home (2010)
  - ALLA Young Adult Book Award
  - The Cybils Awards Master List
- Fourmile (2012)
  - Bank Street Best Children's Book of the Year 2013
  - 2014-2015 Indian Paintbrush Nominee Titles
  - Kirkus Best Teen Books of the Year
  - Indiana Young Hoosier Award Master List
  - Maine Student Book Award Master List
  - 2014-2015 MASL Readers Awards Preliminary Nominees
  - The Mobile Bay Art & Music Awards (MODDYs) Master list
  - South Carolina Children's Book Award Master List 2014
  - Vermont Dorothy Canfield Fisher Award Master List

== Published works ==
=== Novels and collections ===
- Alabama Moon, Farrar, Straus and Giroux, 2006
- Dirt Road Home, Farrar, Straus and Giroux, 2010
- Fourmile, Farrar, Straus and Giroux, 2012
- Among the Swamp People, The University of Alabama Press, 2015
- Terror at Bottle Creek, Farrar, Straus and Giroux, 2016
- Hideout, Farrar, Straus and Giroux, 2017
- Deep Water, Farrar, Straus and Giroux, 2018
- Bay Boy, The University of Alabama Press, 2019
- Beast, Farrar, Straus and Giroux, 2020
- The Forgotten Coast, (as Albert Key) Penfish Press, 2021
- The Black Hat and Other Tales of Horror, (as Albert Key) Penfish Press, 2021

=== Memoir, essays ===
- Swamp Writer series, Mobile Bay Magazine, August 2012 - June 2014
- Bay Boy series, Mobile Bay Magazine, July 2014

=== Screenplays ===
- Alabama Moon, Faulkner-McLean Productions, 2009
- L.A. Dirt, Tundra Films, 2014
