= Liz Moore (author) =

American author (born 1983)

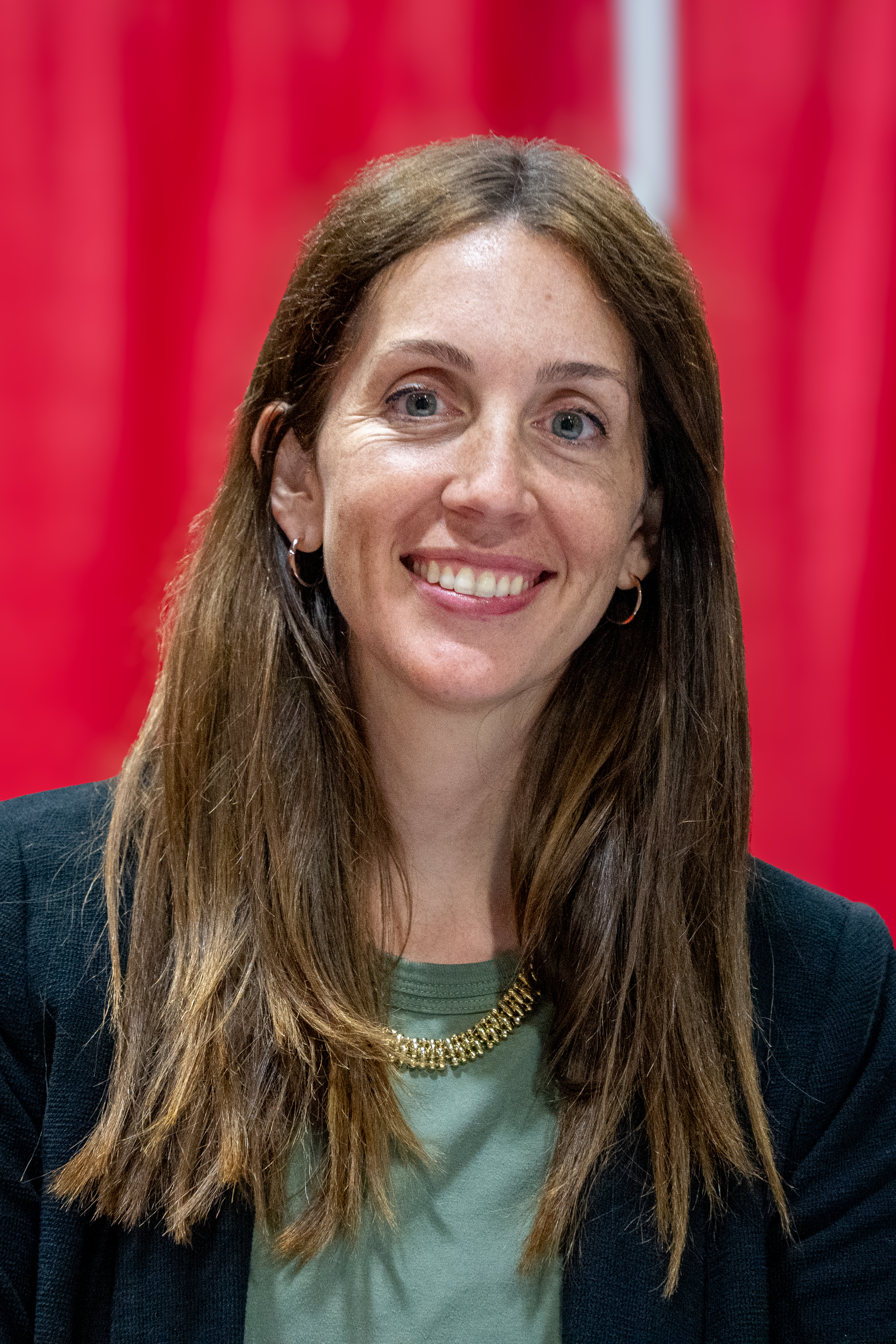
- Moore at the National Book Festival 2025
- Born: May 25, 1983 (age 43)
- Education: Barnard College; Hunter College (MFA)
- Occupation: Author
- Children: 2

Liz Moore (born May 25, 1983) is an American novelist, screenwriter, and producer. She is a Professor of English at Temple University where she directs the MFA program in Creative Writing. After a brief time as a musician in New York City, which inspired her first novel, Moore shifted her focus to writing. She received the 2015 Rome Prize in Literature from the American Academy in Rome, and her 2012 novel Heft was longlisted for the International IMPAC Dublin Literary Award. Her novel Long Bright River was adapted into a miniseries for Peacock.

== Early life and education ==
Moore grew up in Framingham, Massachusetts and received a bachelor's degree from Barnard College in Manhattan, New York City. She received a Master of Fine Arts in creative writing from Hunter College in New York City in 2009.

== Career ==
Moore wrote her first novel, The Words of Every Song (Broadway Books, 2007), while still attending Barnard College. The novel, a set of interconnected short stories related to the music industry, was partially inspired by her own experience as a musician.

Moore’s second novel, Heft (W.W. Norton, 2012), tells the story of the unlikely relationship between 550-pound, housebound former literature professor and a troubled teenage athlete he begins to tutor. Moore says the novel “allowed [her] to explore many of the thoughts and compulsions and emotions around food and eating that had been a part of [her] since young childhood.” Heft was well received critically and commercially. The novel was published in five countries, longlisted for the International IMPAC Dublin Literary Award, and appeared on many notable year-end “best-of” lists.

In 2014, Moore was awarded the Rome Prize in Literature from the American Academy in Rome. During her fellowship in Rome, she completed work on her third novel, The Unseen World (W.W. Norton, 2016). The novel deals with a young woman unraveling the mysterious past of her father, the former director of a notable Boston computer science laboratory. The story was partially inspired by Moore’s own upbringing in and around “lab culture” as the daughter of a physicist.

Her fourth novel, Long Bright River (Riverhead Books, 2020), became an instant New York Times and international bestseller and was featured on Barack Obama’s favorite books list. Set in Philadelphia’s Kensington neighborhood, the novel tells the story of two sisters on opposite ends of the opioid crisis—one a police officer, the other suffering from heroin addiction. The book is, in part, informed by Moore’s time teaching writing workshops and interviewing residents in Kensington after moving to Philadelphia. The novel was also the inspiration for a Peacock limited TV series, released in March 2025, with Moore serving as co-creator, executive producer, and co-writer.

The God of the Woods (Riverhead Books, 2024), Moore’s fifth novel, was selected as the Barnes & Noble Book Club pick in July 2024. It went on to be shortlisted for the Barnes & Noble Book of the Year award. It was selected for Barack Obama's Summer Reading List and voted by viewers of The Tonight Show Starring Jimmy Fallon as their choice for the Summer 2024 Fallon Book Club. Moore appeared as a guest on The Tonight Show in recognition of the book's selection. It is in production for television, by Netflix.

Moore teaches in the College of Liberal Arts at Temple University in Philadelphia, where she is the Director of the MFA program in Creative Writing for the Department of English.

== Personal life ==
During her years in New York, Moore (herself a guitar player) worked at Matt Umanov Guitars in Greenwich Village and performed as a folk musician. Moore fronted The Liz Moore Band from 2004-2005 and released a solo record titled Backyards in 2007. Moore cites Joni Mitchell, Carly Simon, and Phoebe Snow as musical influences.

Moore lives in Philadelphia with her husband and two children.

== Bibliography ==
=== Novels ===
- The Words of Every Song (2007, Crown Publishing) ISBN 9780767926423
- Heft (2012, W.W. Norton & Company) ISBN 9780393343885
- The Unseen World (2016, W.W. Norton & Company) ISBN 9780393354416
- Long Bright River (2020, Riverhead Books) ISBN 9780525540687
- The God of the Woods (2024, Riverhead Books) ISBN 9780593418918
