= Luciane Buchanan =

New Zealand actress and filmmaker (born 1993)

- Born: 18 July 1993 (age 33); Auckland, New Zealand
- Education: University of Auckland
- Occupation: Actress
- Years active: 2012–present

Luciane Buchanan (born 18 July 1993) is a New Zealand actress. She is known for her starring role in the Netflix action thriller series The Night Agent from 2023 until 2025. She has also featured in Filthy Rich (2016–2017) and The New Legends of Monkey (2018–2020).

== Early life ==
Buchanan was born and raised in Herne Bay, Auckland. She is of Tongan and Scottish descent. Her family could speak Tongan, but her mother insisted on her completely acquiring English due to socioeconomic pressures surrounding them as Pacific Islanders.

== Career ==
Her first appearance was in the 2011 telefilm Billy. She did not take any formal acting classes but rather practiced on the spot of many film sets; she later took formal acting classes at the Auckland Performing Arts Centre (TAPAC), including with Miranda Harcourt. She graduated with a Bachelor of Arts in Drama and Psychology from the University of Auckland in 2017.

She made a short autobiographical film Lea Tupu'anga / Mother Tongue in 2024.

In June of 2026, it was announced Buchanan would return as Rose Larkin in the final season of The Night Agent.

== Filmography ==
Year	Title	Role	Notes
2011	Billy	Cherie James	Television film
2013	The Blue Rose	Aroha Nash	11 episodes
2015	Power Rangers Dino Charge	Waitress	1 episode
2016	The Brokenwood Mysteries	Tai Smith	1 episode
2016–2017	Filthy Rich	Kennedy Truebridge	Main role
2018	Stray	Lily	
2018–2020	The New Legends of Monkey	Tripitaka	Main role
2021	Sweet Tooth	Louisa	Episode: "Big Man"
2021	Mr. Corman	Astrid	Episode: "Many Worlds"
2021	The Panthers	—N/a	Associate producer
2023	The Tank	Jules	
2023–2025	The Night Agent	Rose Larkin	Main role (seasons 1–2)
2025	Chief of War	Kaʻahumanu	Main role, 8 episodes
2026	Evil Dead Burn	Thya	
